= Gascoyne (disambiguation) =

Gascoyne is an administrative region in Western Australia.

Gascoyne may also refer to:

== Places ==
=== Western Australia ===
- Gascoyne bioregion
- Gascoyne Junction, Western Australia
- Gascoyne River
- Electoral district of Gascoyne
- Electoral district of Gascoyne (Legislative Council)
- Shire of Upper Gascoyne

=== Elsewhere ===
- Gascoyne, North Dakota

== Other uses ==
- Gascoyne (surname)
- HMAS Gascoyne, two ships

== See also ==
- Gascoyne coast (disambiguation)
- Gascoyne-Cecil, a surname
- Gascoigne, a surname
- Gascon (disambiguation)
- Gascony (disambiguation)
