= Gascony (disambiguation) =

Gascony is a province of southwestern France.

Gascony may also refer to:

- Duchy of Gascony or Duchy of Vasconia, a duchy in the Middle Ages
- Landes of Gascony, or Landes de Gascogne, a natural region of France
- Cuisine of Gascony

== See also ==
- Gascon (disambiguation)
- Gascogne (disambiguation)
- Gascoyne (disambiguation)
