= Gascon =

Gascon may refer to:

- Gascony, an area of southwest France
- Gascon language
- Gascon cattle
- Gascon pig
- Gascon (grape), another name for the French wine grape Mondeuse noire

== People ==
- Elvira Gascón (1911–2000), Spanish painter and engraver
- Esteban Agustín Gascón (1764–1824), Argentine statesman and lawyer
- Gabriel Gascon (1927–2018), Canadian actor
- George Gascón (born 1954), American police officer, District Attorney of San Francisco
- Gilles Gascon, Canadian cinematographer
- Jean Gascon (1920–1988), Canadian opera director, actor, and administrator
- José Ángel Gascón (born 1985), Spanish footballer
- Karla Sofía Gascón (born 1972), Spanish actress
- Miguel Sebastián Gascón (born 1957), Spanish politician and economist
- Sarai Gascón Moreno (born 1992), Spanish swimmer

== See also ==
- Gascon campaign (disambiguation)
- Gascon Saintongeois, a breed of dog
- Gascony (disambiguation)
- Gascogne (disambiguation)
