= Cuisine of Gascony =

Regional French culinary tradition

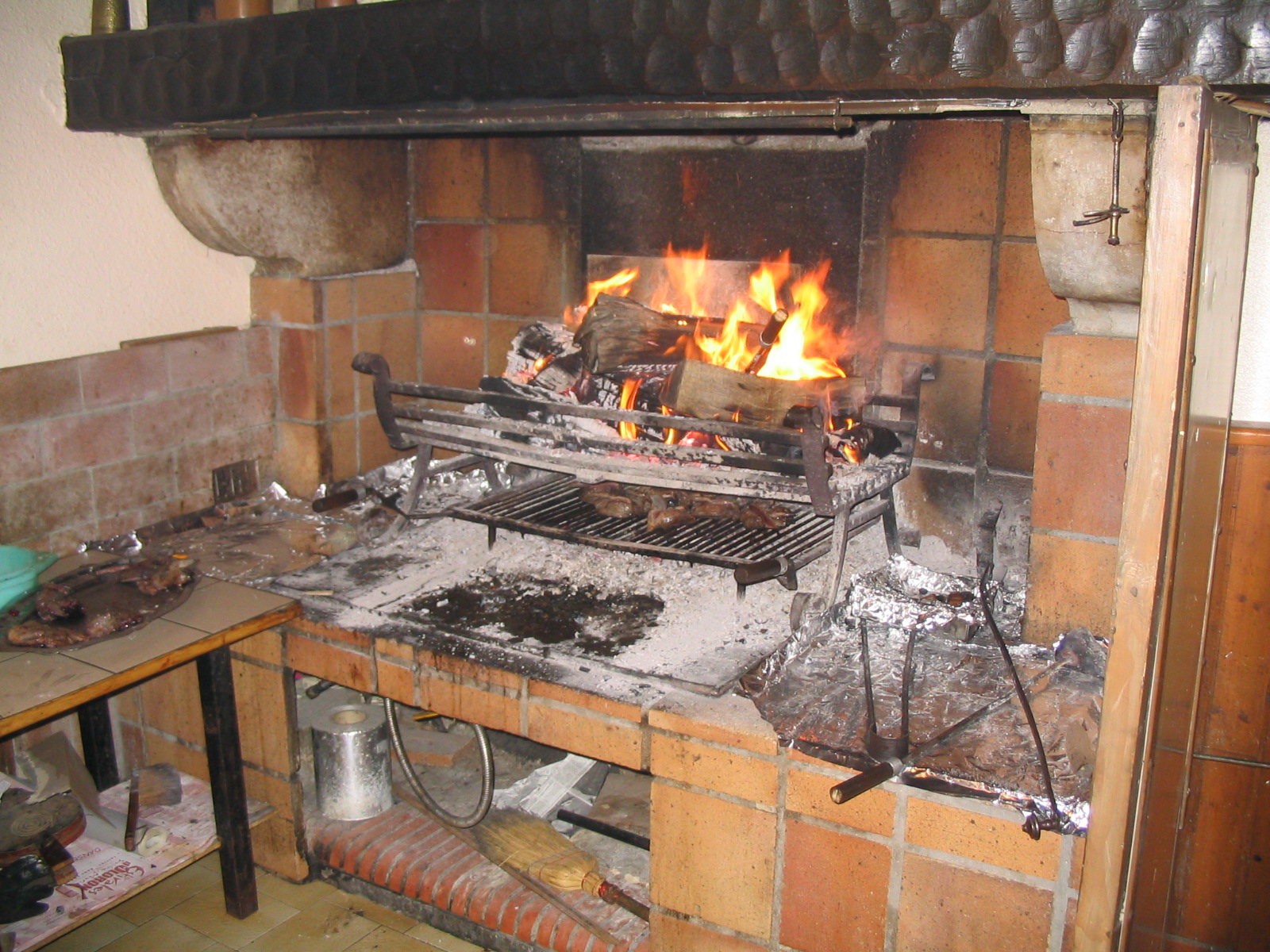
Pigeons being flame-grilled

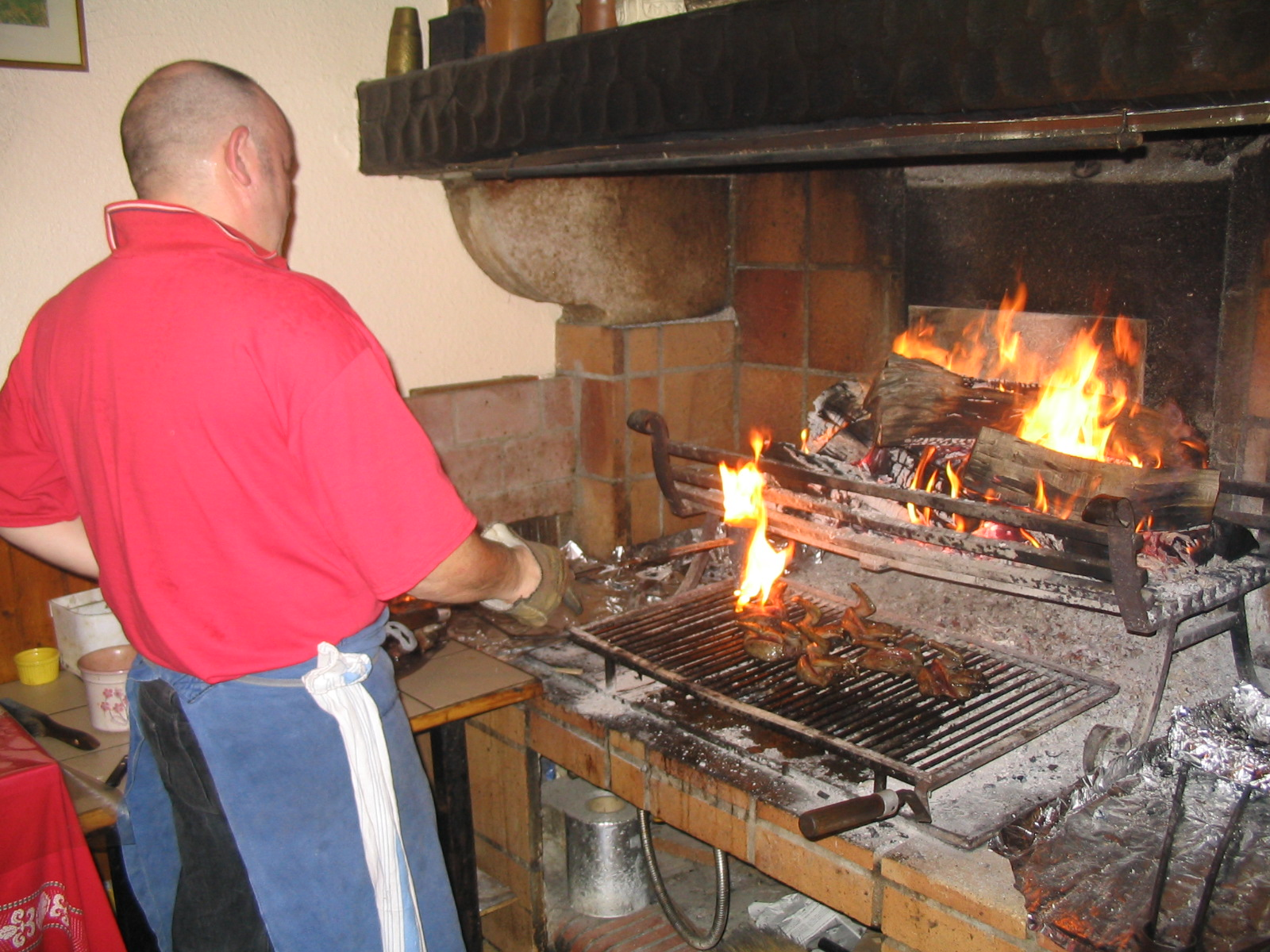
Capucin pigeons

The cuisine of Gascony is one of the pillars of French cuisine. Its originality stems from its use of regional products and from an age-old tradition, typical of the Aquitane and the Midi-Pyrenees, of cooking in fat, in particular goose and duck fat, whereas the cuisine of the south of France favours frying in oil and the cuisine of Normandy contains more dishes that are simmered or cooked in butter. The long life expectancy of Gascons, despite a rich diet, is a classic example of the French paradox.

== Main elements ==
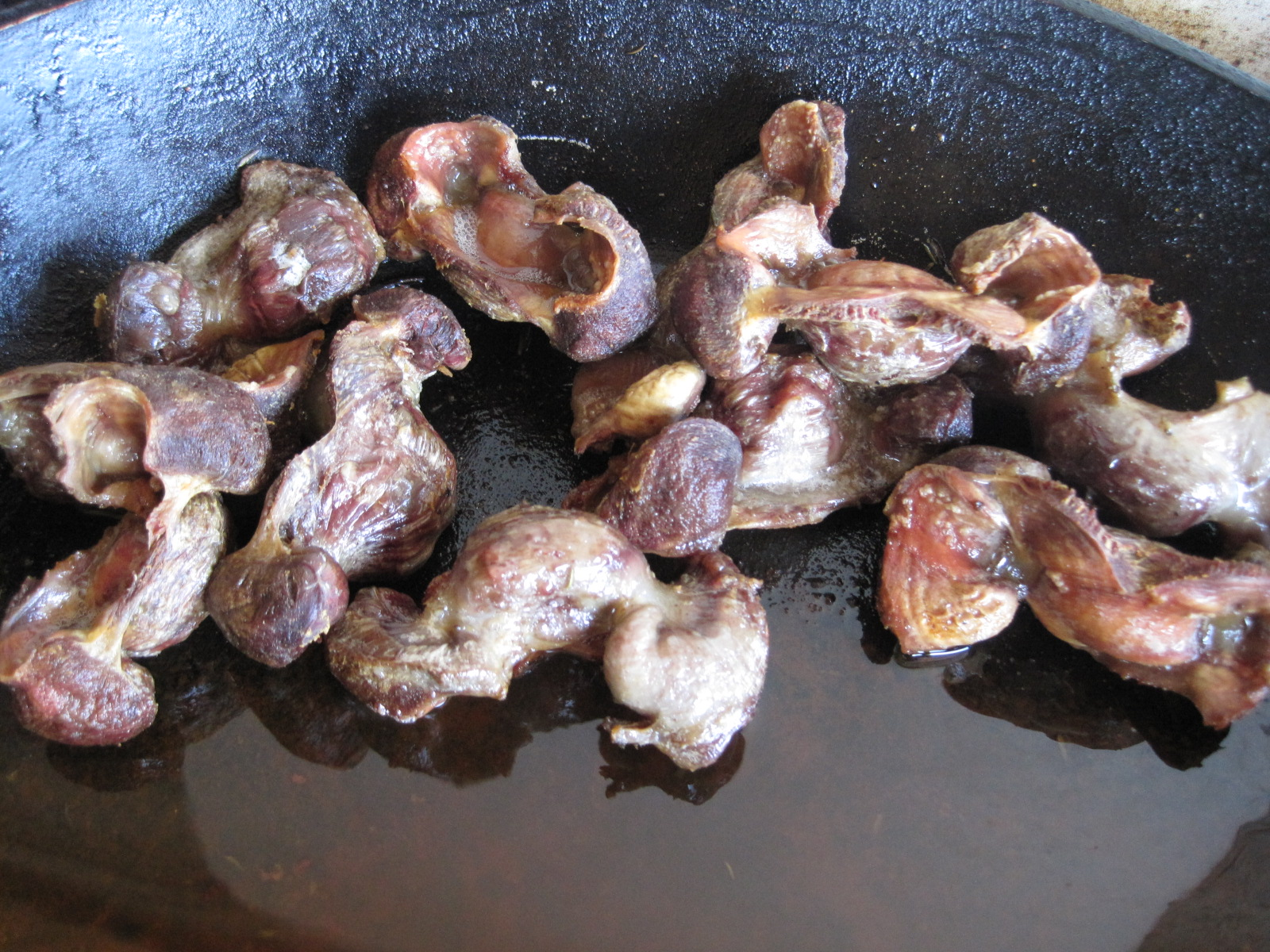
Cooked duck gizzards

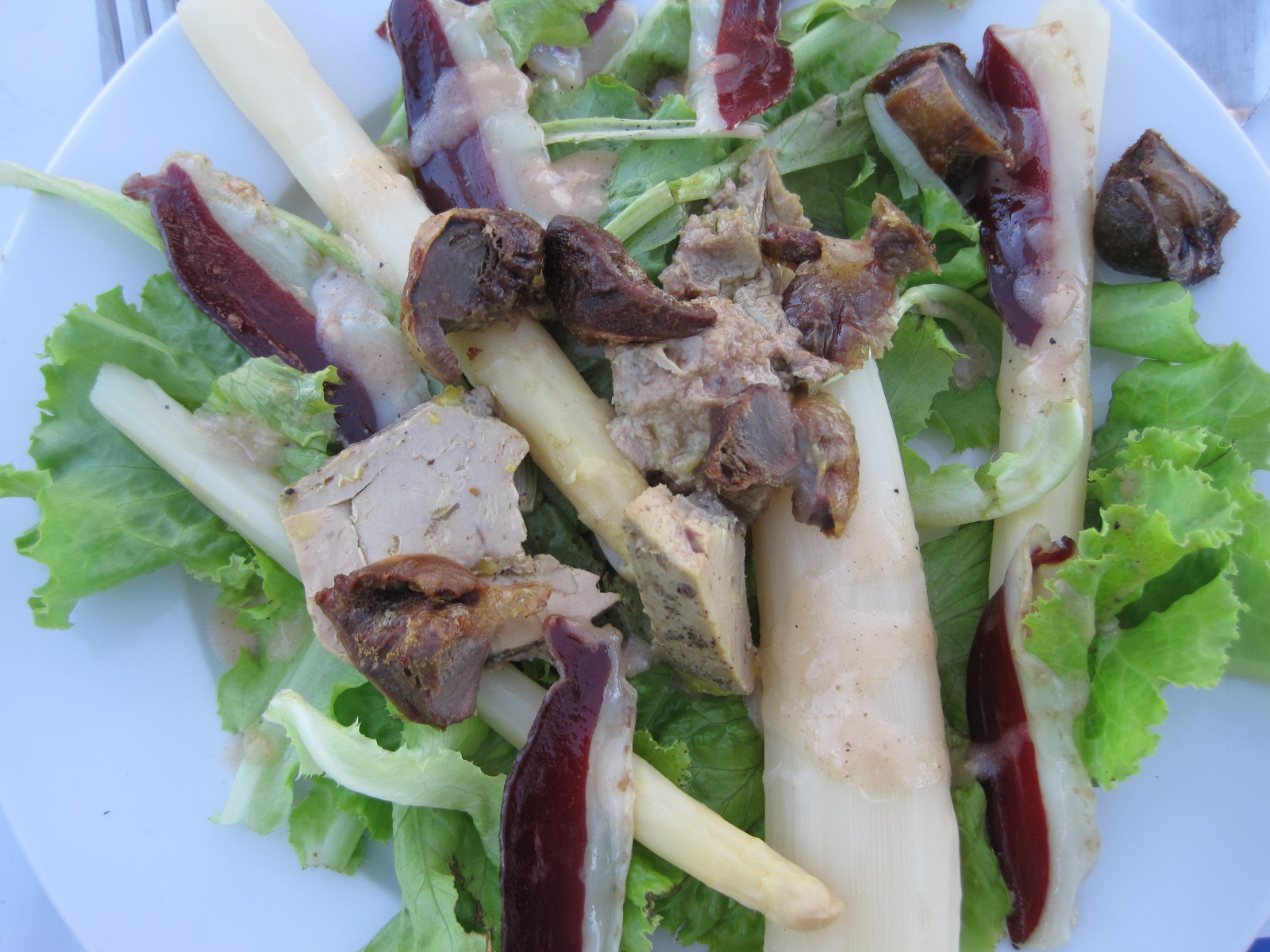
Landaise salad with duck gizzards, duck fillet and foie gras, asparagus etc.

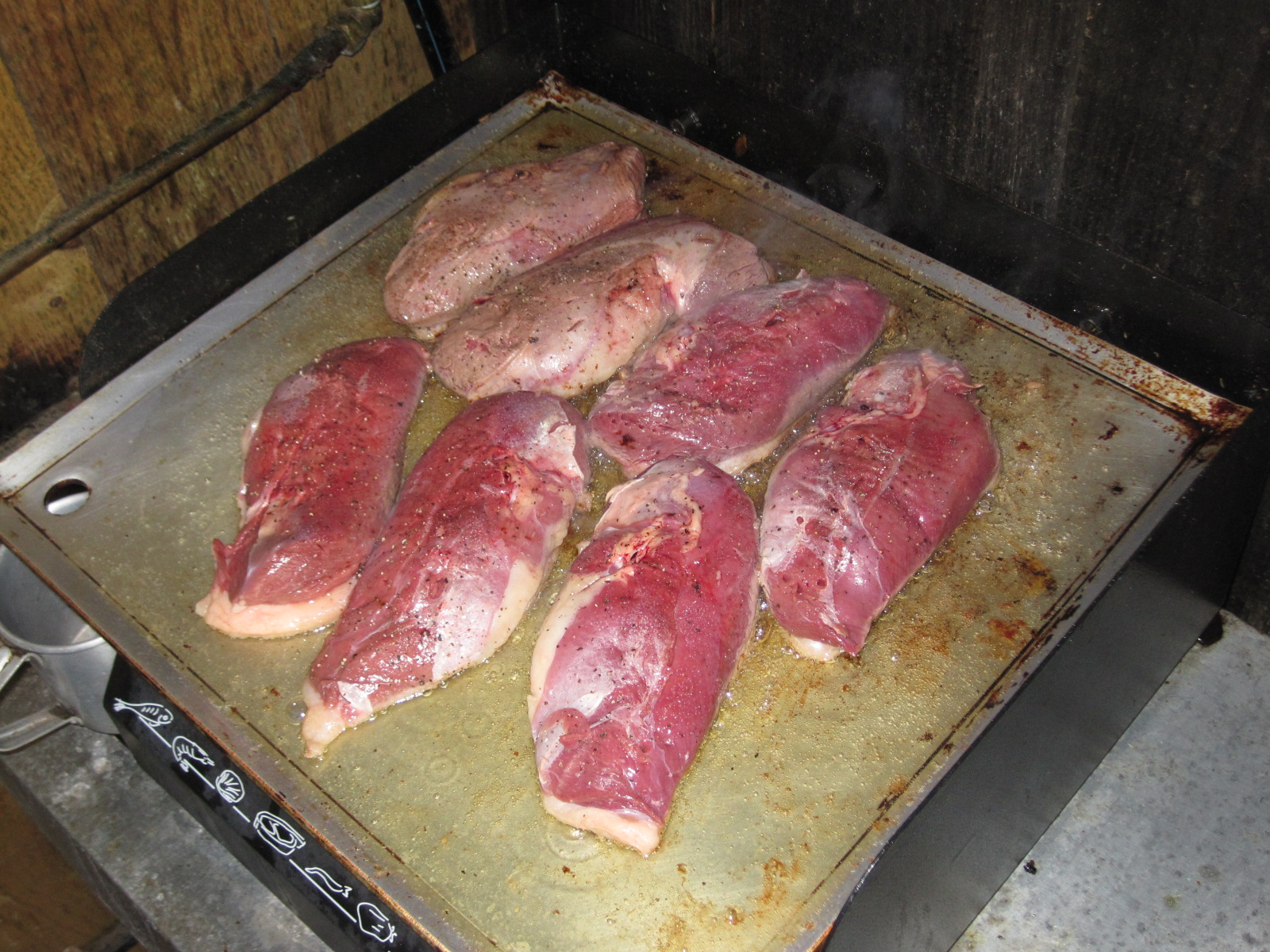
Landes duck breast pan-fried, in the process of cooking

The cuisine of Gascony is characterised by the use of regional products such as duck fat and duck foie gras, salted ham, and the famous mild chilli of Gascony. Common condiments are Bezolles mustard, garlic, persillade, and onion. The cèpe mushroom is frequently eaten; Tricholoma equestre was traditionally eaten but is now considered poisonous after several cases of rhabdomyolysis were linked to its consumption. Larks and the common wood pigeon are commonly eaten game birds; the ortolan, previously commonly eaten, has been a protected species since 1999. Coastal seafood includes oysters, peppery furrowshells, eel elvers, lampreys, and shad.

Commonly consumed wine includes clarets (rosés) and tannic reds, the most important being Bordeaux wine (cabernets and merlot), but also Madiran wines (tannat and cabernets), the most tannic and well suited to the local food. Dessert wines, ideal with brioche, chestnuts and foie gras, are usually those local to Bordeaux (Sauternes and Béarn (Jurançon AOC et Pacherenc). Côtes de Gascogne and Armagnac are used in cooking, and to flavour tourtières.

Rural family gatherings will often include grilled chestnuts with a glass of vin bourru (sweet and in the process of fermentation, sold with no cork), as well as roste, grilled bread, rubbed with garlic or with tjonque (a sauce made from the leftover juices of pan-fried duck).

== Dishes ==
=== Soups ===
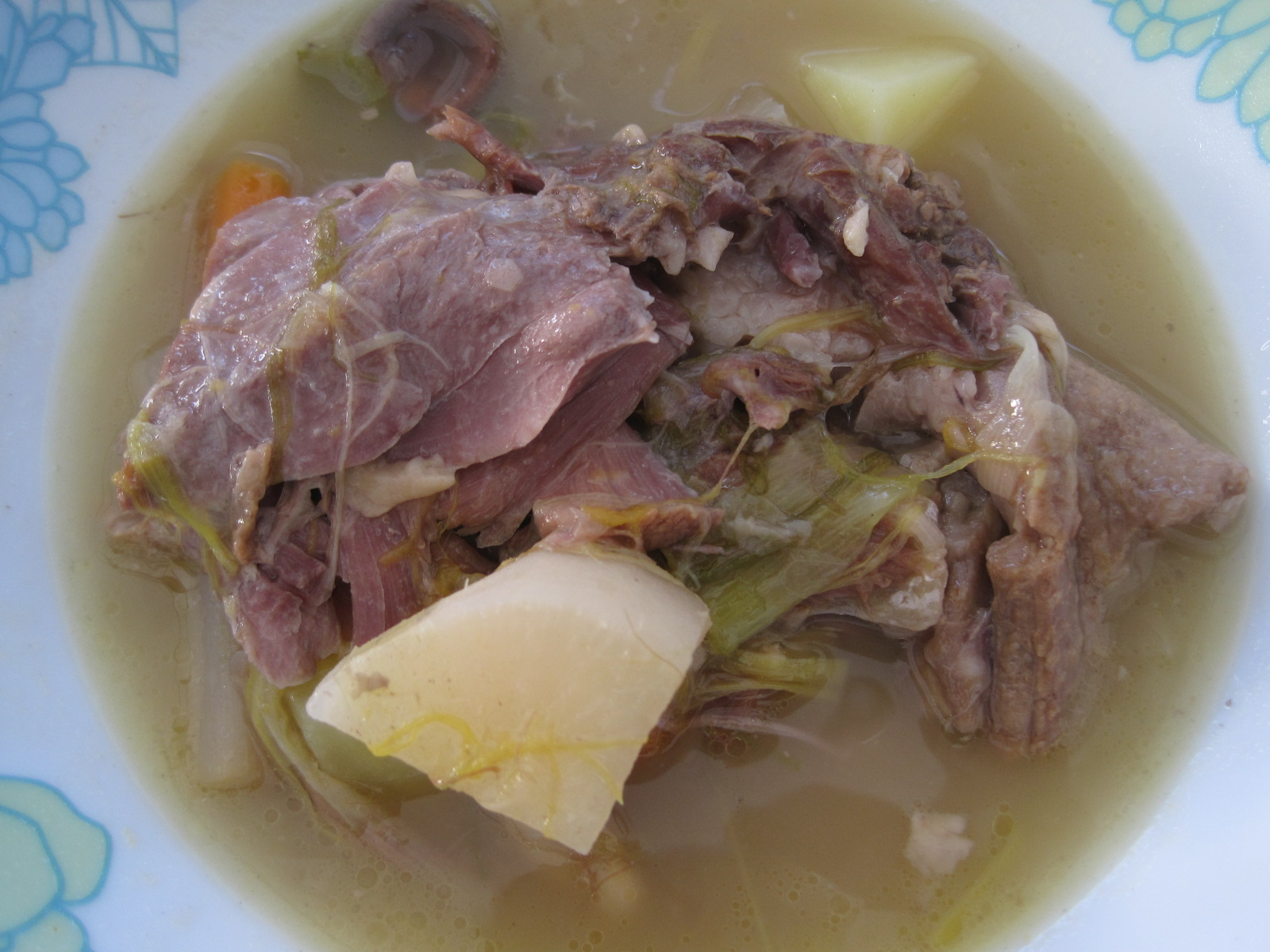
A plate of garbure

- Garbure

=== Entrées ===
- Foie gras, either candied or fried fresh in cutlet form
- Landaise salad, which is characterised by its use of duck breast and gizzards
- Smoked duck breast
- Bayonne ham
- Crépinettes of Bordeaux
- Baby eels
- Sanquette, a fried dish made from lamb blood, garlic, sweet onions, parsley and pancetta

=== Main course ===
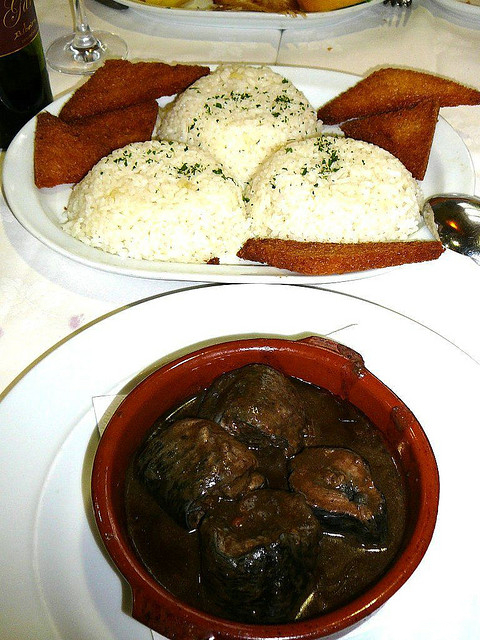
Lamprey à la bordelaise

- Chalosse beef
- Duck confit
- Duck breast
- Pigeon stew
- Stew made from Gascon pig
- Omelette using sweet Gascon chillies
- Omelette using cep mushrooms (Boletus edulis)
- Lampreys à la bordelaise (cooked in a dark sauce made from lamprey blood)
- Tricandilles (boiled pork tripe, grilled on a barbecue)
- Millas, a tart made from cornflour with a savoury accompaniment

=== Cheese ===
- Amou, a sheep's cheese, made in the Amou region

=== Desserts ===
- Pastis landais, a cake flavoured with orange blossom, vanilla and rum
- Canelés
- Tourtière, a tart with apples or prunes
- Croustade, decorated with puff pastry
- Cruchades, fried corn cakes
- Millas with sweet accompaniments

== See also ==
- Basque cuisine
- Occitan cuisine

== Bibliography ==
- Rémy Constans, Gastronomie gasconne à la Belle Époque, Association de livres en livres, Bon-Encontre, 1998
- Jean-Claude Ulian, Gascons à table, Art-Média, 2004
