= Caterham Group =

Company

Caterham Cars Group Ltd.
- Industry: Motorsport, automobiles, composites, Technology
- Founded: 2011
- Headquarters: Dartford, England, UK
- Owner: VT Holdings

Caterham Group is the parent company for a range of automotive and motor racing businesses, a British multinational company and a subsidiary of the Japanese automaker VT Holdings.

== Management team ==
| Position | Name |
|---|---|
| Group CEO/CEO Of Caterham Cars | Graham Macdonald |
| Caterham Bikes CEO | Ishsal Ishak |

== Businesses ==
- Caterham Cars
- Caterham Bike
- Caterham Graduates Racing Club

=== Vehicles ===
- 2014 Caterham Aero Seven
- 2013 Caterham Duo Cali

=== Former ===
- Caterham F1 Team sold in July 2014 to a consortium of Swiss and Middle Eastern investors
  - 2012 Caterham F1 CT01
  - 2012 Caterham Renault Project CT02
  - 2013 Caterham F1 CT03
  - 2014 Caterham F1 CT05

Caterham Racing was Caterham F1's feeder team, and competes in the GP2 Series since 2011. The team was sold in October 2014 to Status Grand Prix.

- Caterham Technology and Innovation (CTI)
- Caterham Moto Racing Team
- Caterham Racing
- Caterham Composites

== Caterham Moto Racing Team ==
Kamarudin Bin Meranun, Co-Chairman of Caterham Group, confirmed on 13 October 2013 that the newly formed Caterham Moto Racing Team will contest the Moto2™ World Championship from the start of the 2014 season. Dato' Kamarudin also confirmed that American rider Josh Herrin will be one of the team's two riders in 2014, and that a technical partnership has been signed with Suter Racing Technology to jointly develop a Caterham-Suter chassis over the next two years.

== Caterham Technology ==
Created in 2011, Caterham Technology and Innovation (CTI) is part of the Caterham Group of companies and based at the Caterham Technology Centre in Hingham, Norfolk. The company is leading the development of a new range of vehicles and products for the Caterham brand as well as providing engineering services to customers across the automotive, motorsport, aerospace and marine industries.

Housing the companies new design office and workshops, the Hingham facility continues its focus on composite component production and inspection - for both internal and external projects.

As part of the group Caterham technology is working with the Caterham F1 Team (Leafield, UK) and Caterham Composites (Hürth, Germany) offering a broad range of simulation, analysis and specialist test facilities to support specific project requirements.

Mike Gascoyne formerly involved in setting up the F1 Team became CEO of Caterham Technology in early 2012 as well as his role as CEO of Caterham Composites.

On 5 November 2012, Renault announced a 50:50 joint venture with Caterham Technology aimed at bringing back alife the Alpine brand in the form of the Alpine-Caterham sports car

On 27 November 2014, CTI announced that it would close its business in Hingham with 68 job losses. The company’s chief executive Graham MacDonald is said to have taken the decision to shut down its engineering and technology arm near Wymondham because it was no longer financially viable.

== Caterham Composites ==
In 2007, the Managing Directors Phil Hall and Duncan Bell founded the Hall & Bell GbR in Cologne after leaving Toyota Motorsport GmbH. Having worked with Mike Gascoyne in the past, the company worked on the Lotus Racing T127 beginning in 2009 resulting in the acceptance of Lotus Racing F1 into FIA F1 Championship 2010. The following year the company became a legal entity as Composite Designs EU GmbH. In November 2011 Caterham Group purchased the company and since then Composite Designs EU GmbH trades as Caterham Composites. From the central-European base in Cologne, Caterham Composites have put together a team with a cross-section of nationalities, experiences and interests. Projects so far have included the development and production of the T127 and the interior design of the Bombardier Global Express XRS as well as a number of automotive consultancy projects. Caterham Composites now describes itself as a composites consultancy company offering services from structural lightweight design using the latest CAD packages, through to entire turnkey projects from conception to delivery. The company offers consultancy, part-projects, full projects, across all sectors and industries. Composite Designs EU GmbH was dissolved in 2015 followed by Caterham Composites Ltd in the UK in 2016.

== Caterham Cars ==
Caterham Cars is part of the Caterham Group and a manufacturer of specialist lightweight Sports Cars currently based in Crawley, Sussex, UK. Their best known model, the Caterham 7 (or Seven), is a direct evolution of the Series 3 Lotus Seven designed by Colin Chapman and originally launched in 1973. In 1994 the Caterham 21 was launched to celebrate 21 years of Caterham. The most recent model is the SP/300.R produced in conjunction with Lola Cars and launched in 2011.

In June 2012, Ansar Ali announced he was to leave Caterham Cars and Graham Mcdonald (the company's former CFO) became the new CEO.

In January 2013, Caterham Cars announced the launch of a one-make kart series for 2014 through its motorsport division.

== Former ==
=== Caterham F1 Team: 2012–2014 ===
The Caterham F1 Team was the group's Formula One, based at Leafield, UK. The team competed as Caterham for the first time in the 2012 Formula One season, following the renaming of the outfit that raced as Team Lotus in 2011. This followed the acquisition of British sportscar manufacturer Caterham Cars by team principal Fernandes, forming the Caterham Group. Cyril Abiteboul joined as new CEO from Renault Sport F1, later extending his role to team principal.

In July 2014, Fernandes sold the outfit to a group of Swiss and Dubai-based investors. Advised by Colin Kolles, under the terms of the sale the team continued to race as Caterham F1 and remained based at Leafield. Team principal Abiteboul returned to Renault, replaced by former Dutch F1 driver Christijan Albers.
