= Caterham 21 =

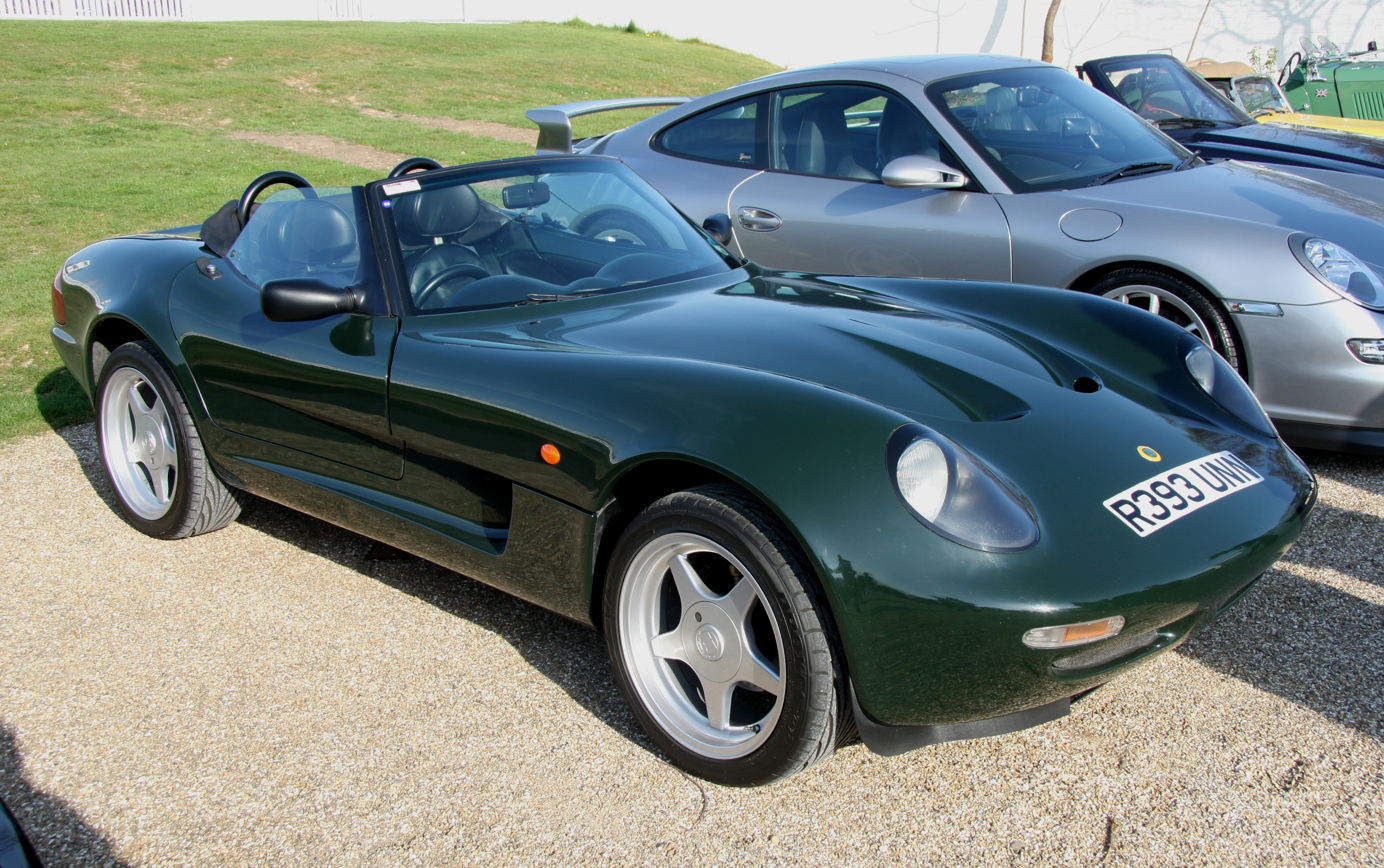

Overview
- Manufacturer: Caterham Cars
- Production: 1994–1999
- Assembly: United Kingdom: Dartford
- Designer: Iain Robertson

Body and chassis
- Class: Sports car (S)
- Body style: 2-door roadster
- Layout: Longitudinal front-engine, rear-wheel drive
- Related: Caterham Seven

Powertrain
- Engine: Rover K-Series 1.6L I4; Rover K-Series 1.8L I4; Vauxhall 2.0L I4; Motopower RST-V8 2.4L Supercharged V8
- Transmission: 5-speed manual (Ford Type 9); 6-speed manual (Caterham)

Dimensions
- Wheelbase: 2,248 mm (88.5 in)
- Length: 3,907 mm (153.8 in)
- Width: 1,580 mm (62 in)
- Curb weight: 665 kg (1,466 lb)

Chronology
- Successor: Caterham C120 (Cancelled)

The Caterham 21 is a two-seat roadster designed and hand built by Caterham Cars in the 1990s. It was based on the mechanicals of the Caterham 7 and was intended to be a more practical version of that car with more conventional sports car styling.

The original car was announced at the 1994 British Motor Show to celebrate 21 years of Caterham Cars’ manufacture of the Lotus Seven. Styled by Iain Robertson and developed by a team under Jez Coates, the aim was to have a car that offered "the chance to experience Caterham motoring in a more practical format". The 21 was offered with a range of four-cylinder engines from 1.6 to 2.0 L, with 115–230 bhp (86–172 kW). Caterham originally intended to produce 200 cars per year, but in fact only 40 to 50 examples were actually made before the project was quietly shelved in 1999.

== Design and specifications ==
Being almost mechanically identical to the Caterham 7, the 21 was set apart by the design of the body. Inspiration was drawn from the design of the Lotus Eleven, and the result was a curved, low-slung shape. The car did not have wind-up windows and its door sills were high and wide, which drew some criticism from contemporary reviewers regarding the car's practicality. Because of extra strengthening in the sills and at the front end, the initial chassis design was considerably more rigid than that in the 7. Adjustments to the suspension and the 21’s extra 100 kg (220 lb) gave a better ride as well.

Some components were taken from mainstream models (such as the rear light clusters from the Mk1 Ford Mondeo hatchback, door mirrors from the Rover 200, front indicators from the Suzuki Cappuccino, etc.) in addition to the Seven-based mechanical underpinnings.

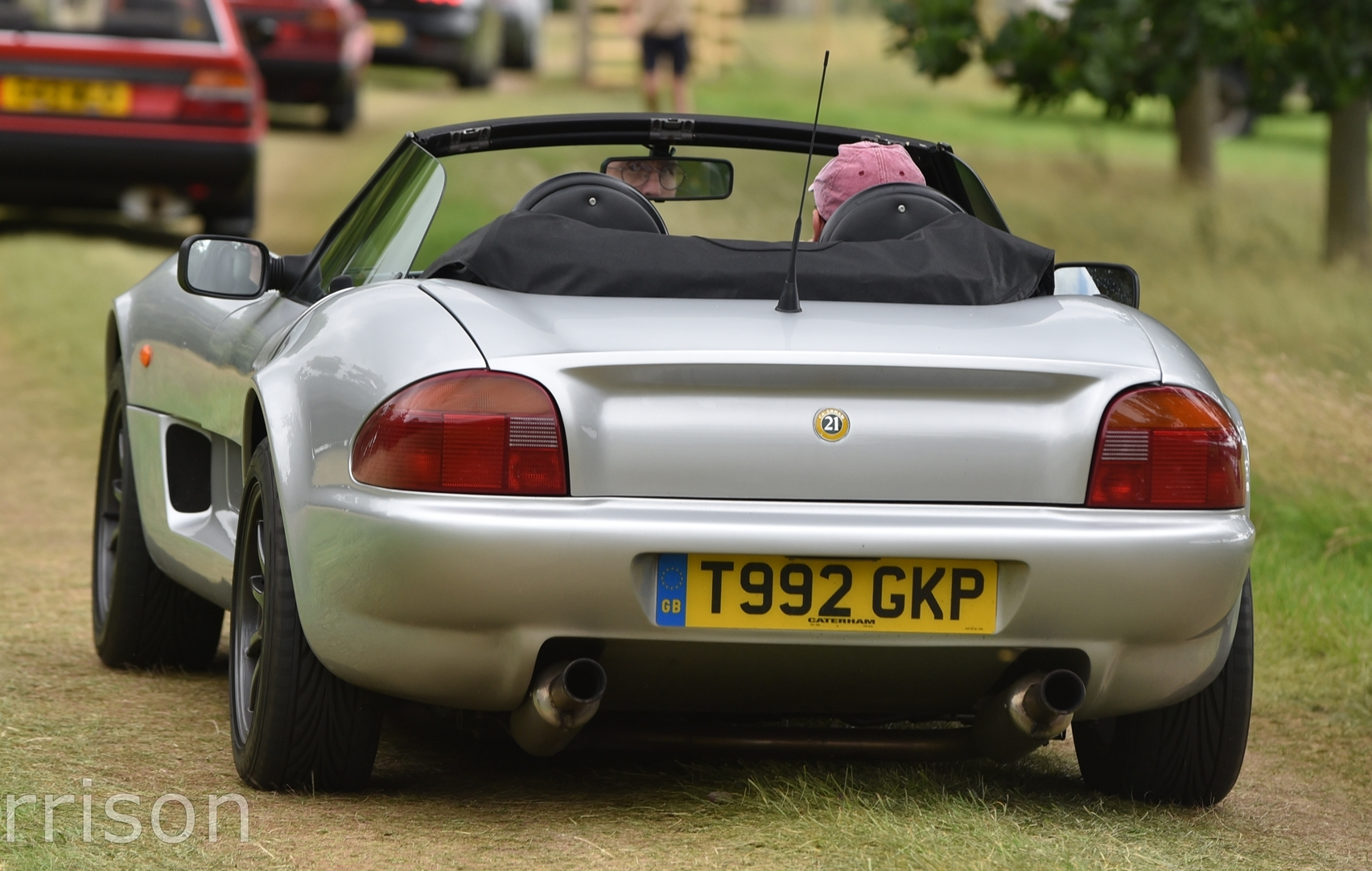
Caterham 21 rear

Most of the cars built by the factory were fitted with either the 1.6L or 1.8L variants of the K-Series engine, all of which were controlled by the Rover MEMS ECU. Two cars were built with engines in the "Very High Performance Derivative" (VHPD) specification. The Ford Type 9 transmission, as used in the Ford Sierra, was the standard gearbox, with Caterham's own 6-speed manual offered as an option. With the 133 hp (99 kW) engine tune, the base car was capable of 0-60 mph (97 km/h) in 6.7 seconds and a top speed of 127 mph (204 km/h).

A single fixed-roof car, named the 21 GTO, was built to be used for racing. This car was equipped with the 230 hp (172 kW) engine from the Caterham 7 R500, and with it the GTO was capable of a 0–60 mph (97 km/h) sprint in 3.8 seconds and a top speed of 153 mph (246 km/h).

== Racing ==
The GT editions of the 21 were successfully raced from 1999 to 2001, including the GT car run by GPS Racing winning its class in the Belcar 24hr race and resoundingly beating the Lotus Elises in that class. Caterham used the GTO car to develop the Minister R500 engine. Caterham's final GTO car ended up with Great Lakes Caterham in Michigan, US and was fitted with the RST-V8 engine, now used in the Caterham Levante (supercharged to 500 bhp).

== Series 2 ==
A single series 2 prototype was created by Caterham, with a view to fitting a "standard" superstructure from an MG F and having enough space for a larger power plant, moving the car into the territory occupied at the time by manufacturers such as TVR. It received a lukewarm reception and wasn't put into production.
