= Caterham Cars =

British sports car manufacturer

Coordinates: 51°16′55.44″N 0°4′43.15″W

Caterham Cars Ltd.
- Formerly: Seven Cars Limited (1974–1989)
- Type: Private limited company
- Industry: Automobiles
- Founded: 1973
- Founder: Graham Nearn
- Headquarters: Dartford, England, UK
- Key people: Kazuho Takahashi (CEO)
- Products: Caterham Seven 170; Caterham Super Seven 600; Caterham Super Seven 2000; Caterham Seven 360; Caterham Seven 420; Caterham Seven 420 CUP; Caterham Seven 620
- Parent: Caterham Group
- Website: caterhamcars.com

Caterham Cars Ltd. is a British manufacturer of specialist lightweight sports cars and the flagship property of the Caterham Group, since 2021 owned by Japanese automotive company VT Holdings, established in Caterham, England, with their headquarters in Dartford, England. Their current model, the Caterham 7 (or Seven), originally launched in 1973, is a direct evolution of the Series 3 Lotus Seven designed by Colin Chapman. In the 1990s the company made the Caterham 21, a two-seater soft top alternative to the MG F and Lotus Elise (which both sold many more units). A track-only car, the SP/300.R, a joint project with Lola was released for customer testing in 2010 and was scheduled for release in 2013.

Caterham was an independent company until their acquisition by Team Lotus in 2011, leading to the formation of Caterham Group. In 2021, Caterham Cars was acquired by VT Holdings, Japanese importer for the Caterham Seven since 2009.

== History ==
Lotus origins

Colin Chapman's Lotus Cars launched the Series 1 Lotus Seven in 1957. The car was immediately embraced by enthusiasts as a low-cost, lightweight sports car and successful race car. Revised Series 2, Series 3 and Series 4 versions were subsequently launched in 1960, 1968 and 1970 respectively.

Caterham Cars had been a major Lotus 7 dealer during the 1960s, and its founder, Graham Nearn, purchased the rights to continue manufacture of the Seven design from Chapman in 1973, after Lotus announced its intention to discontinue the model. Caterham initially restarted manufacture of the Lotus Seven Series 4; however, when this proved unpopular, production switched to a Series 3 model in 1974.

In 1974, under the name of Seven Cars Limited, Caterham built 20 production cars with chassis numbers 1 to 20 and one prototype, with chassis number 0 (CS3 3550 – CS3 3570). Of the 21 cars produced in the first year, all were fitted with the Ford-Lotus Twin Cam 1557 cc engine, with the exception of chassis number 7 which, intended for racing, was fitted with a 1962 cc twin cam engine sourced from Alfa Romeo. In 1977 it was announced that Caterham Cars had taken over the rights to build and develop the Twin Cam engine. Caterham also had the big-valve version (with twin Dell'Orto carburettors) emissions tested and obtained a certificate of compliance. In the end, Caterham had engine tuners Vegantune build the engines, using reconditioned twin cam heads, to supply the very important Japanese market. Caterham also had Vegantune develop a version of the Twin Cam using Ford's 1598-cc block (rather than basing it on the earlier 1498 cc unit) with their own, improved DOHC cylinder head. Called the VTA, this variant launched in 1983. Supplied to Caterham Cars as a replacement for the Twin Cam in the Caterham Seven, the VTA featured belt-driven cams. The engine used the later Crossflow block and displaced 1.6 or 1.7 litres. Power was 140 to 160 hp (104 to 119 kW). Around 40 units were supplied to Caterham but quality control was very uneven and Caterham eventually switched over to the Cosworth BDR or the single-cam 1700 Supersprint.

The Caterham 7, based on the Lotus Seven, is one of Caterham's flagship models. With 2007 marking the 50th year of continuous production, the Seven is still successful in clubman-style racing.

Graham Macdonald joined Caterham in 2007 and spent five years as Chief Financial Officer before becoming CEO in 2012. During that period, he steered the business through various changes and challenges before securing long-term security by overseeing the acquisition by VT Holdings.

Prior to that Caterham Cars has been run by an ex-Lotus management team led by Ansar Ali (CEO) and Mark Edwards (COO).

In July 2022, Bob Laishley moved from his role of Chief Strategy Officer to CEO.

Bob has amassed over 40 years of experience in all aspects of vehicle design, innovation, engineering, sourcing and project management. Culminating with six years as Program Director for NISMO road cars and sports models, including the Nissan 370z and GT-R.

In 2021, Caterham appointed a new agency of record, Rika to be their global partner for customer strategy, marketing & media, supporting initiatives including a brand-wide CRM rollout and the development of Caterham’s digital estate.

=== Construction ===
As with its Lotus Seven precursors, Caterhams are constructed of aluminium sheet attached to a tubular steel chassis. Nose cone and wings are either GRP or carbon fibre depending on specification. All Sevens are front-engined with rear-wheel drive and two seats. Their extremely high performance is achieved through light weight (less than 500 kg (1,102 lb) on some versions) rather than particularly powerful engines. As well as a lightweight chassis and bodywork, Caterham Sevens achieve their very low mass through their lack of comfort and safety oriented features such as a fixed roof, doors, radio, air-conditioning, airbags, traction/stability control, ABS, satellite navigation or cruise control. As a result, the Seven is somewhat limited in its practicality for everyday usage and is instead recognised by driving enthusiasts for its focus on driving enjoyment, making it an ideal track/race car or 'Sunday' car.

=== Kit format ===
Chapman and Lotus helped to pioneer the British kit car industry. The Lotus Seven was offered in kit form to allow buyers to avoid new car tax in the UK. Subsequently, Caterham continued offering cars in 'complete knock down' (CKD) kit form as the tradition of hand building your own Seven was well established amongst enthusiasts. Today, all Caterham Sevens are still offered in kit form in the UK except the CSR (Series 6) model. Modern Caterham kits differ from the majority of kit cars as all parts are supplied ready to assemble, not requiring a donor car, fabrication or any special skills.

=== International ===
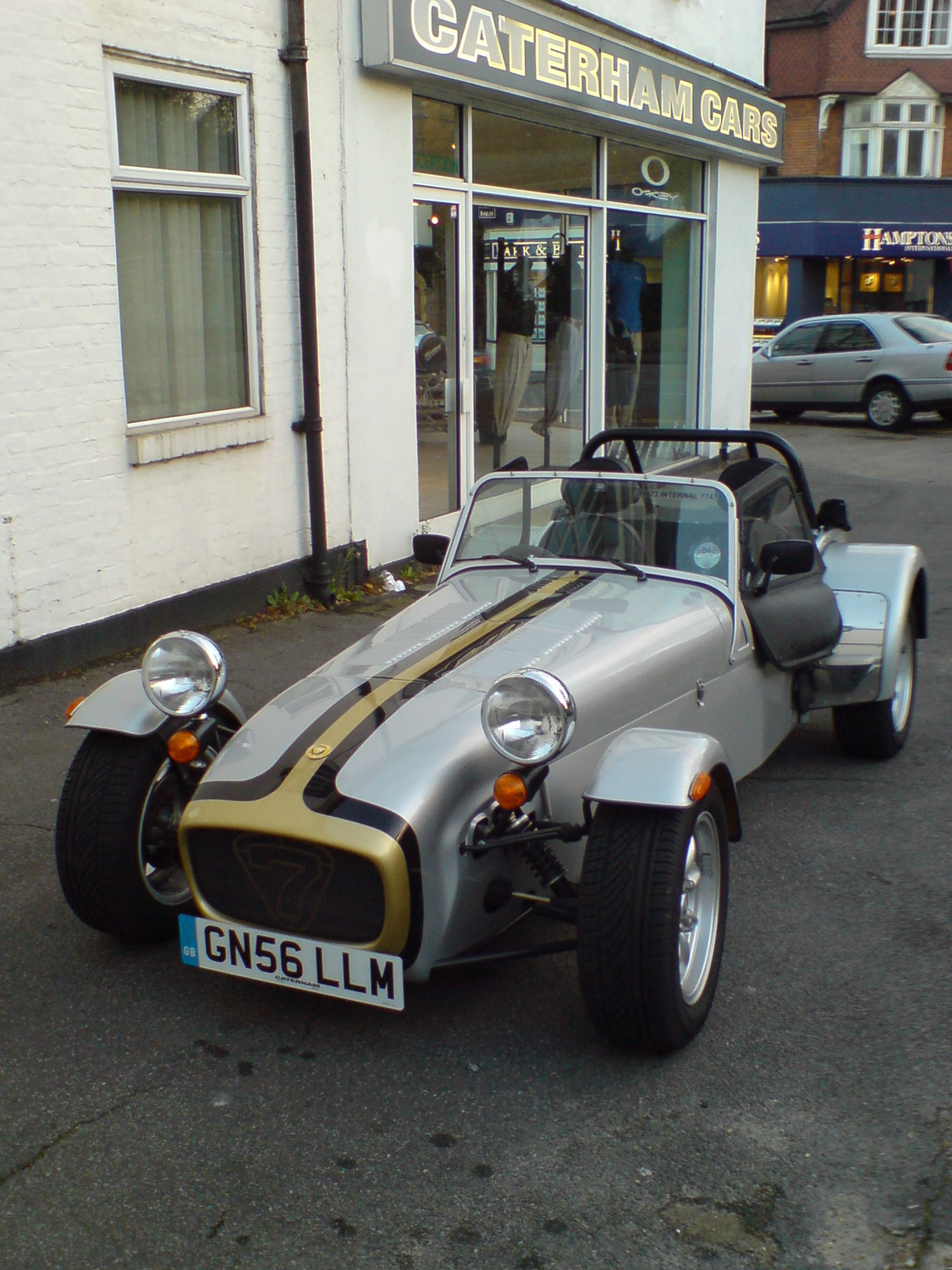
Caterham 7 Roadsport near Caterham South showroom

Although the Seven has always been popular with enthusiasts outside of the UK marketplace, export of the Seven to other markets has increasingly been limited by homologation, safety and emissions regulations in the modern era. As a result, the chassis/engine combinations, specifications, pricing and kit-form availability vary widely between countries.

In the past in the United States Caterhams were sold as kits only, lacking some modern safety features required of manufacturers, but which are not required for individually assembled vehicles. Buyers could either choose to construct the cars themselves or pay their regional dealers or local builders to assemble them. Typically the engine and transmission are sourced separately as a unit – often from Caterham – but all other components (including frame, suspension, differential, driveshaft, interior, wiring and instruments) were provided in kit form.

In the UK, the vehicles can be obtained as kits or entirely assembled by Caterham and registered for the road under IVA (Individual Vehicle Approval) regulations. In the '60s, the original Lotus Seven was sold only in kit form in both the UK and the US, in order to evade the very high taxes on complete new cars that were not assessed on automobile parts.

==== United States ====
As of 2014, however, Caterham has named Superformance their official distributor in the United States. International demand has increased dramatically in part due to the addition of a F1 Race team and the changes in Caterham's structure focusing on the distribution of the Seven worldwide. Caterham has since introduced a new model line up and focused on their production and production times to better suit their new international market, making their partnership with Superformance possible. Sevens will be shipped to the US in part-built form and sold as rolling chassis via Superformance's nationwide dealer network for customers to then complete the build personally or through the Superformance dealership. The initial US line-up includes several Caterham Sevens: 280, 360, 480, and the 620R.

=== Location ===
Until 1987 the offices, factory and showroom of Caterham Cars were located in the town of Caterham, Surrey.

In 1987, the production and administration of the company moved to a new factory in Dartford, Kent.

Caterham Cars retained a Caterham South showroom and servicing facility in the town of Caterham adjacent to the railway station until February 2013. The Caterham dealership closed after the premises were sold for development and the showroom relocated to temporary facilities in Crawley. Additionally the Caterham Midlands showroom operates outside Leicester.

In 2012 elements of Caterham Cars moved into a new facility in Leafield, Oxfordshire, where it is expected the new models of cars to be produced in the future will be developed and built. This new facility was formerly used by the Arrows F1 team and the Super Aguri F1 team. The Leafield site also accommodated the Caterham F1 team, which moved from its original base in Hingham, Norfolk and competed in Formula One between the 2012 and 2014 seasons.

In 2024 Caterham Cars moved production to a brand new facility, still in Dartford, Kent.

=== Caterham 21 ===
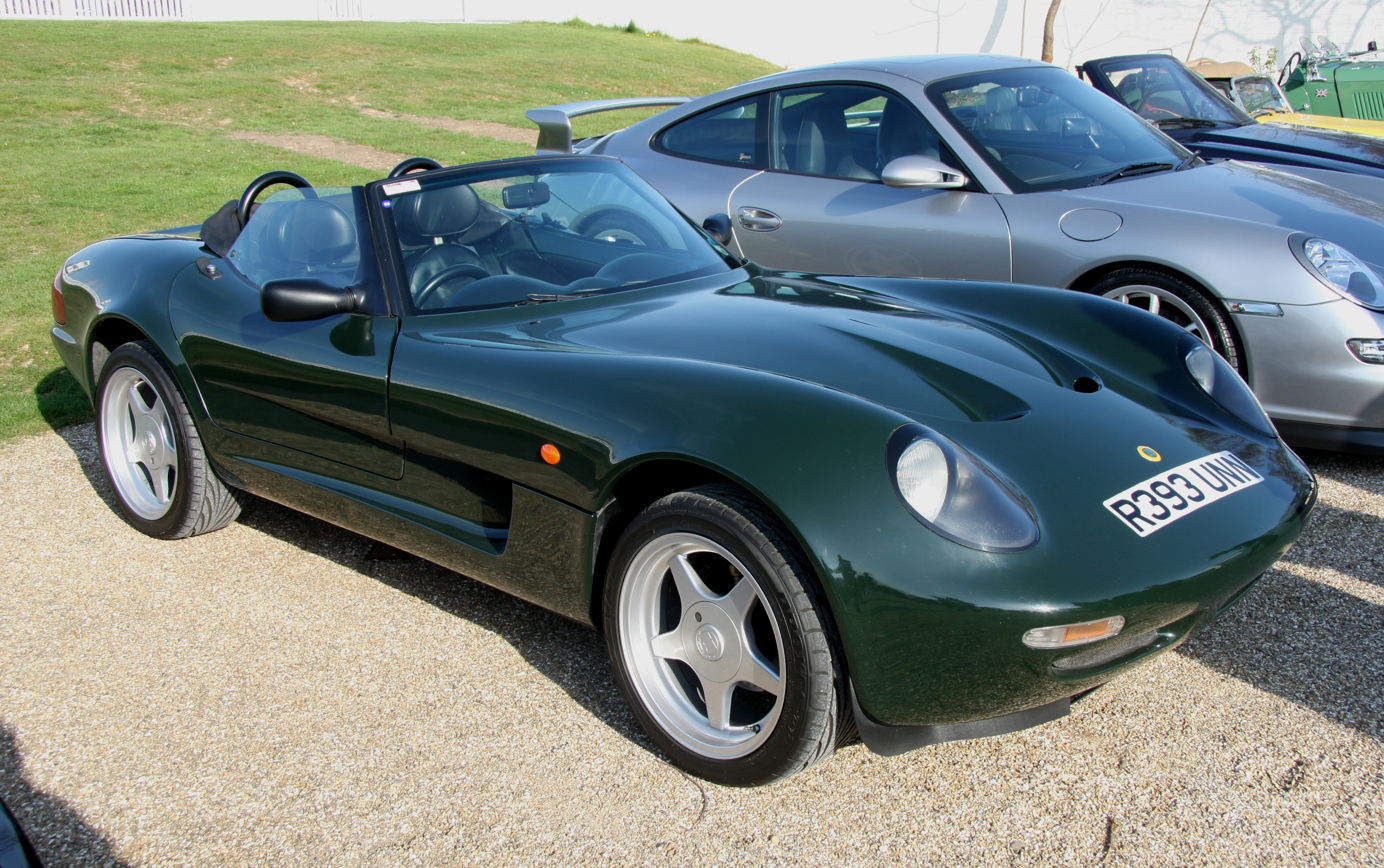
Caterham 21

In 1994 Caterham produced a model called the '21'. Mechanically the 21 was very similar to the 7, using a modified 7 spaceframe chassis with a new GRP roadster-style body, including a wrap-around windscreen and fold-away fabric hood (convertible top) manufactured by Oxted Trimming Company.

The 21 benefited from a considerably stiffer setup than a 7, due to the work on the chassis and having a full body. Comfort was introduced in the same minimalist style as the 7, adding just enough to make it a proper roadster without adding too much weight.

Caterham, however, underestimated the effort involved in creating a completely new car and took far too long from its inception to deliver the first customer cars, seeing many people who had placed deposits defect to the Lotus Elise and other vehicles. Early ones were used as "prototypes", leaving customers to help iron out some of the foibles of the new car.

The 21 never sold particularly well, with only 48 ever made. It had moderate racing success in the Belcar 24-hour series in Europe and is credited with helping Caterham develop the widetrack setup used in SVs (amongst other developments) and the CSR's sweeping interior is reminiscent of the original 21 design.

=== Caterham SP/300.R ===
The SP/300.R is a new track-only model designed by Caterham alongside Lola Cars. The SP/300.R is a limited edition with limited production to 25 per annum.

== Caterham 7 model line-up ==
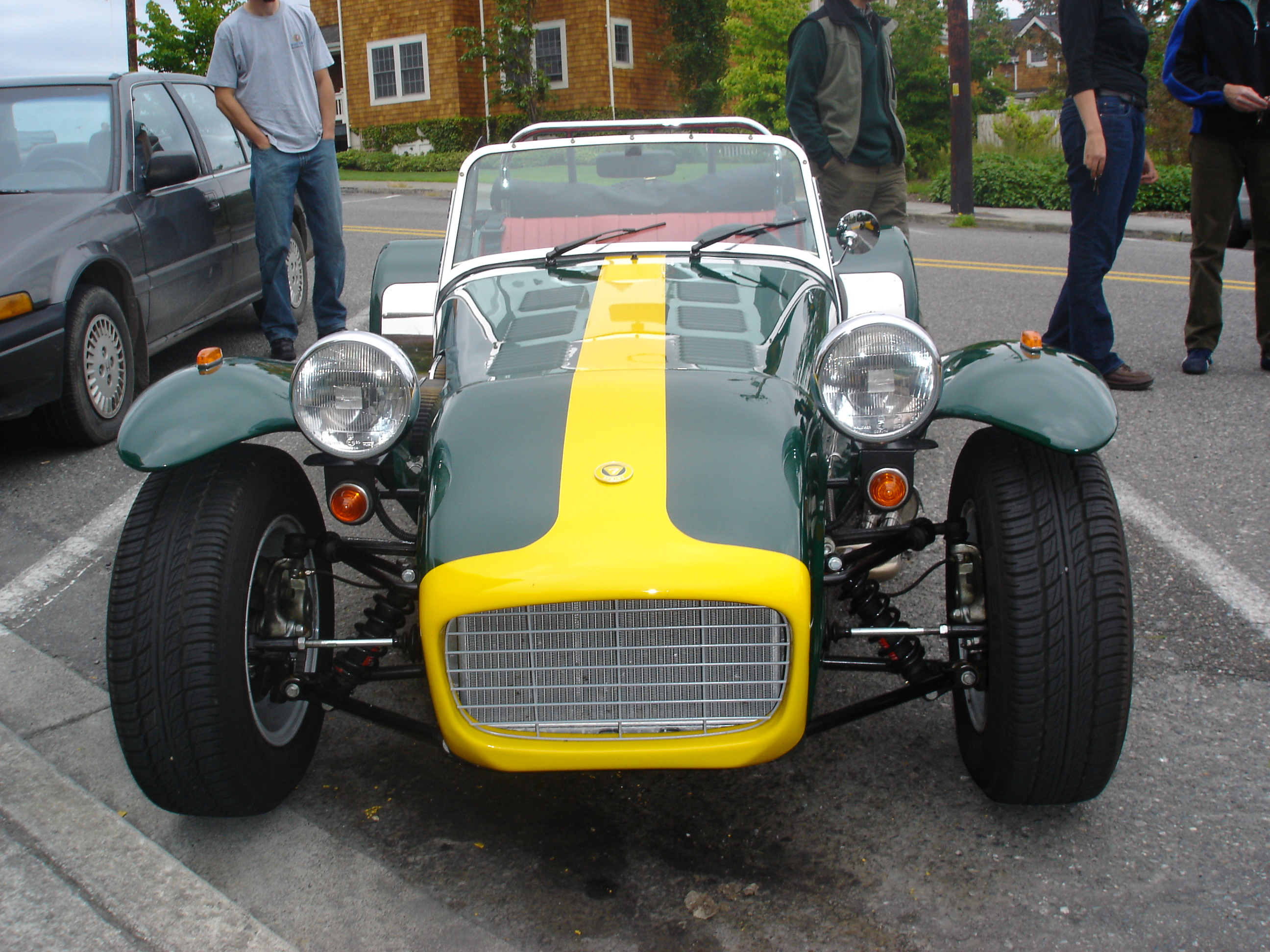
Classic Caterham

=== Chassis variants ===
There are currently three chassis options available; Series 3, Series 5 and CSR.

The chassis were originailly brazed at Arch Motors, but when manufacture moved to Westbury the chassis became welded.

==== Series 3 (S3) ====
The most popular variant retains the dimensions and layout of the Lotus 7 Series 3.

==== Series 5 (SV) ====
Caterham introduced this variant in 2000 to accommodate larger drivers (space is restricted in the S3 for drivers over 6 ft (1.8 m) tall.) Although visually very similar to the S3, the SV is longer, taller and wider and has significantly more space for taller and broader drivers with the added benefits of more luggage space, a larger fuel tank and more stability. The SV chassis is 25 kg (55 lb) heavier than the S3.

==== CSR (Series 6) ====
The CSR was launched in 2005 following extensive research and development by Caterham with the objective of creating an improved Seven. The CSR is based on the larger dimensions of the SV but with a substantially revised and stiffer chassis, inboard 'pushrod' front suspensions, fully independent rear suspension, improved aerodynamics, potent Cosworth engines and a new 'integrated' dashboard layout.

=== Model/trim variants ===
==== Classic ====
The most basic version of the 7 was traditionally offered with a 'live' rear axle but now comes with De Dion tube rear suspension found in other models of the same range. This trim level strips away all non-essential equipment and comforts.

- Classic trim is available on S3/SV chassis
- Engines: 1.4-litre K-Series (105 bhp) or 1.6-litre K-Series (120 bhp).

==== Roadsport ====
Roadsport is the trim level intended for general usage, different weather conditions and touring. The spec includes a full windscreen and weather equipment to increase practicality. A large range of performance options are available. The Roadsport dates back to 1996 when it was called the Superlight R, in 1998 a much softer version came out called the Seven Clubsport 1.8. The range continued to be developed in the years as a great alternative to someone who wanted a little bit more than a Classic, but less than a Superlight.

- Classic trim is available on S3/SV chassis
- Engines: 1.6-litre Ford Sigma (120,125 or 150 bhp) or 2.0-litre Ford Duratec (175 bhp).

===== Roadsport A =====
Roadsport A cars are ex-Academy cars, with no engine upgrades. However a number of performance upgrades such removing the windscreens and lights, widetrack front suspension and uprated dampers are allowed, as is professional team support. RSA races at the same events as RSB, but has longer 30-minute races.

===== Roadsport B =====
Roadsport B is largely for drivers that have come through the previous season's Academy. Some minor modifications are permitted to the car, including fitting a rear anti-roll bar and sticky Avon CR500 tyres. Technical support is still provided by the factory, and professional team support is not permitted. RSB has 20-minute races at 7 or 8 'double-header' meetings over the course of the season, usually all in the UK.

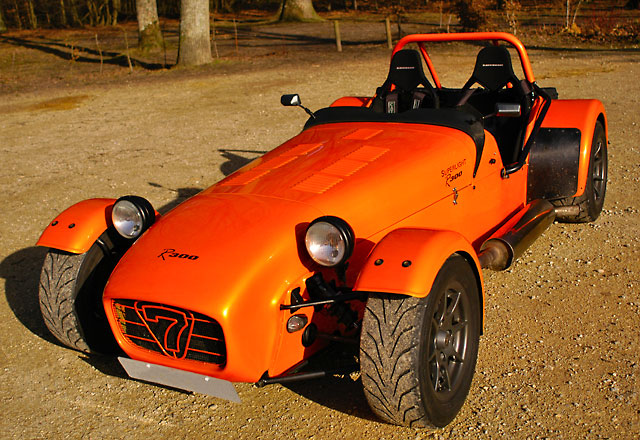
Caterham 7 Superlight R300

==== Superlight ====
The Superlight is intended for track and fast road usage. Superlight spec includes performance options such as carbon bodywork and a close ratio 6-speed gearbox. A wind deflector in place of the windscreen makes a helmet more or less mandatory. The Superlight R400 uses a 2.0 litre Ford Duratec engine tuned to 210 bhp (157 kW; 213 PS). The R400 name indicates the car's 400 bhp-per-tonne power-to-weight ratio.

- Superlight trim is available on S3/SV chassis
- Engines: 1.6-litre Ford Sigma (150 bhp) or 2.0-litre Ford Duratec (175 bhp, 210 bhp or 263 bhp).

===== Superlight R300 =====
The Superlight R300 was introduced for 2009, designed to bridge the gap between RSA and the existing Superlight R400 class. It is expected to be popular with experienced RSA racers wanting to move on to the next level in speed.

===== Superlight R400 =====
The Superlight R400 series is Caterham Motorsport's premier British championship. The R400 is a 220 bhp Cosworth powered dedicated race car with a Quaife six-speed sequential gearbox replacing the standard Caterham unit used in the R300. As with all series above Academy, it runs on Avon CR500 tyres.

===== Superlight R500 =====
The Superlight R500 series is the latest of Caterham Motorsport's Superlight series of RSA Racing cars. Powered by a 2.0-litre Ford Duratec engine producing maximum horsepower (bhp/rpm) of 263 bhp @ 8500rpm and maximum torque (lb.ft/rpm) of 177 lb.ft @ 7200rpm. With a weight of 506 kg (516 kg) and a sequential gearbox, it is capable of 0–60 mph in 2.88 seconds and a power-to-weight ratio of 520 bhp-per-tonne. Advertised top speed 150 mph. The R500 has been made Top Gear car of the year 2008. In another appearance earlier in the series, it placed fifth on the Power Lap board with a 1:17.9. This time beat the €1,100,000 (£899,000/$1,550,000), 1001 hp Bugatti Veyron.

===== Superlight R600 =====
In October 2012 a supercharged model for a race-series above the R300-class was released, including slick tyres and a sequential gearbox.

===== Superlight 620R =====
In September 2013 Caterham made a car called the 620R. It was based on the R500, but was supercharged. This increased the power output to 315 PS (311 hp; 232 kW) at 7,700 rpm and the torque to 219 lb⋅ft (297 N⋅m) at 7,350 rpm. It also reduced the 0–60 mph (97 km/h) time to 2.79 seconds. It has a power-weight ratio of 568 bhp-per-tonne and a top speed of 155 mph.

==== CSR ====
The CSR chassis comes in two basic trims which mirror those of the S3/SV cars. The 'basic' CSR has a road and touring oriented spec with full windscreen and weather equipment. This is available as the CSR200 (200 bhp) or CSR260 (260 bhp). The CSR Superlight (also 260 bhp) is the current Caterham performance flagship strips away the windscreen, integrated dash and other comfort-oriented components for maximum performance, with specialist 'Dynamic dampers' added to improve its already phenomenal grip. The 'basic' CSR set an unofficial time of 1.17.4 on the BBC Top Gear test track at Dunsfold, placing it ahead of many of the world's most expensive performance cars.

- Engines: 2.3-litre Ford Duratec tuned by Cosworth (200 bhp or 260 bhp)

==== RS Performance RST-V8 engine ====
The 'Caterham Levante', built by RS Performance Engine Developments Ltd. (RS=Russell Savory), is a mostly-carbon-fibre bodied Caterham, with Kevlar seats, combined with an "over 500bhp" 2.4-litre, 40-valve supercharged V8 and a reduced body weight of 520 kg (1,146 lb), boasts almost 1,000 bhp (746 kW; 1,014 PS) per tonne (initial announced specifications were 550 bhp (410 kW; 558 PS) and 530 kg (1,168 lb), but the RS website specifies "in excess of 500bhp," and 520 kg (1,146 lb) or 530 kg (1,168 lb); the math may or may not achieve "over 1,000 bhp (746 kW; 1,014 PS) per tonne"). The eight cars, costing £115,000, sold out and only eight will be produced to celebrate more than 50 years in production. Two days' of mandatory "driver training" are included in the price of the car.

=== Kit build ===
All of the 2008 model line-up is available as a 'CKD' complete kit for build by the owner, with the exception of CSR models.

== Engines ==
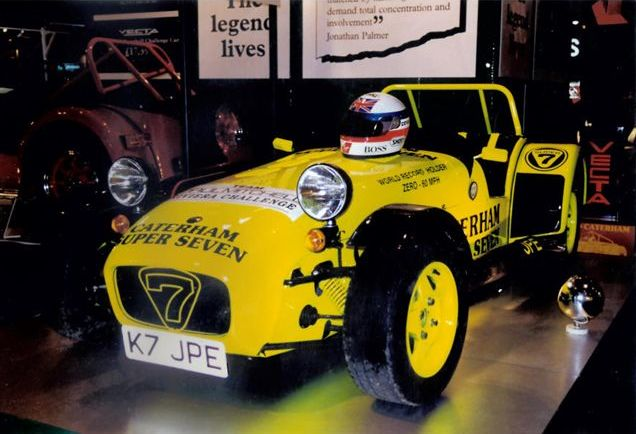
JPE

Historically, engines have been supplied by Ford, specifically Ford Kent engines or Cosworth-derived race-prepared BDA/R units, enlarged to 1.7 litres and generating 150–170 bhp. In the early '90s, Caterham started using powerplants from other sources, with the least expensive models using 1.4-litre K series engines from MG Rover for the base model, and Vauxhall engines including full race versions of the 16 valve 2.0XE "red top" as fitted to 1990 Vauxhall Works Touring Cars. Rover engines span a power output of 110–250 bhp in the R500 Evolution, Vauxhall engines 165 bhp (123 kW; 167 PS) to 320 bhp (239 kW; 324 PS) in some factory built versions of the car. A 250 bhp (186 kW; 253 PS) Caterham JPE (Jonathan Palmer Evolution) briefly held the world record for production car 0–60 mph times (at 3.4 seconds) until it was bettered by the $1.2M McLaren F1.

The many aftermarket tuning companies for these cars have also offered the Ford Zetec, Honda Fireblade, Honda Blackbird, Suzuki Hayabusa and even the Mazda Rotary engine. Since 2017, several cars have been built with the direct injection turbo Ford Ecoboost 1.6.litre version of this engine which with a hybrid turbo provides more horsepower than Caterham's own supercharged Duratec, and more torque than any factory car including the V8 Levante.

In 2001, Caterham designated MG Rover the sole engine supplier for factory-built Sevens, with Ford Zetec, Honda Fireblade, Yamaha R1 and Suzuki Hayabusa engines still available for kit assembly. The Rover engines were based on the K series and carried the 'Xpower' branding. However, the partnership evidently came to an end with the collapse of MG Rover, with the 2005 model introducing a Ford Duratec engine.

Typical powerplant output ranges from 140 bhp (104 kW; 142 PS) to over 300 bhp (224 kW; 304 PS), depending on specifications and modifications.

The gearbox is either the classic Ford T9 five-speed, a slightly modified Mazda MX-5 five-speed gearbox, or Caterham's own six-speed box. The T9 is cheap and durable, but has gear ratios meant for a much heavier car. The six-speed gearbox is expensive and had early 'teething' problems, but its ratios are perfectly matched for the Seven. Independent companies such as Quaife do offer replacement gear kits for the T9 as well as sequential boxes for those with a racing fever and the need for a more robust transmission.

The most extreme engine/chassis combination available from the factory as of 2013 was the 620R with the 310 bhp (231 kW) engine, bringing the 610 kg (1,345 lb) car from 0–60 mph (97 km/h) in 2.79 seconds. The previous model also held a production car world record for zero to 100 mph (161 km/h) back to zero at 10.73 seconds, set on 27 April 2004.

== Motor racing ==
=== Formula One ===
For the 2012 season, Team Lotus was officially renamed Caterham F1 Team. The team continued to compete under this name in the 2013 and 2014 seasons, before financial problems caused it to fold.

=== GP2 Series ===
Between 2012 and 2014, Caterham raced in the GP2 series, under the guise Caterham Racing, which was rebranded from the Caterham Air Asia team that raced in the 2011 season.

The team raced under the same Green and Yellow livery as the Formula 1 team.

Caterham Racing was used by the company to act as a feeder team towards developing racing drivers for the Caterham F1 Team, until the company had to cease operations in both series.

Initially based in Hingham, the team had moved to the Leafield Technical Centre alongside the Caterham F1 team in August 2012, where they remained until both teams were terminated in 2014.

==== Caterham Motorsport Ladder ====
The Caterham Motorsport Ladder is a progression through the various Caterham Cars championships, starting with the Caterham Academy, and moving through ultimately to their most prestigious European events. The championships which form the ladder are:

==== Caterham Academy ====
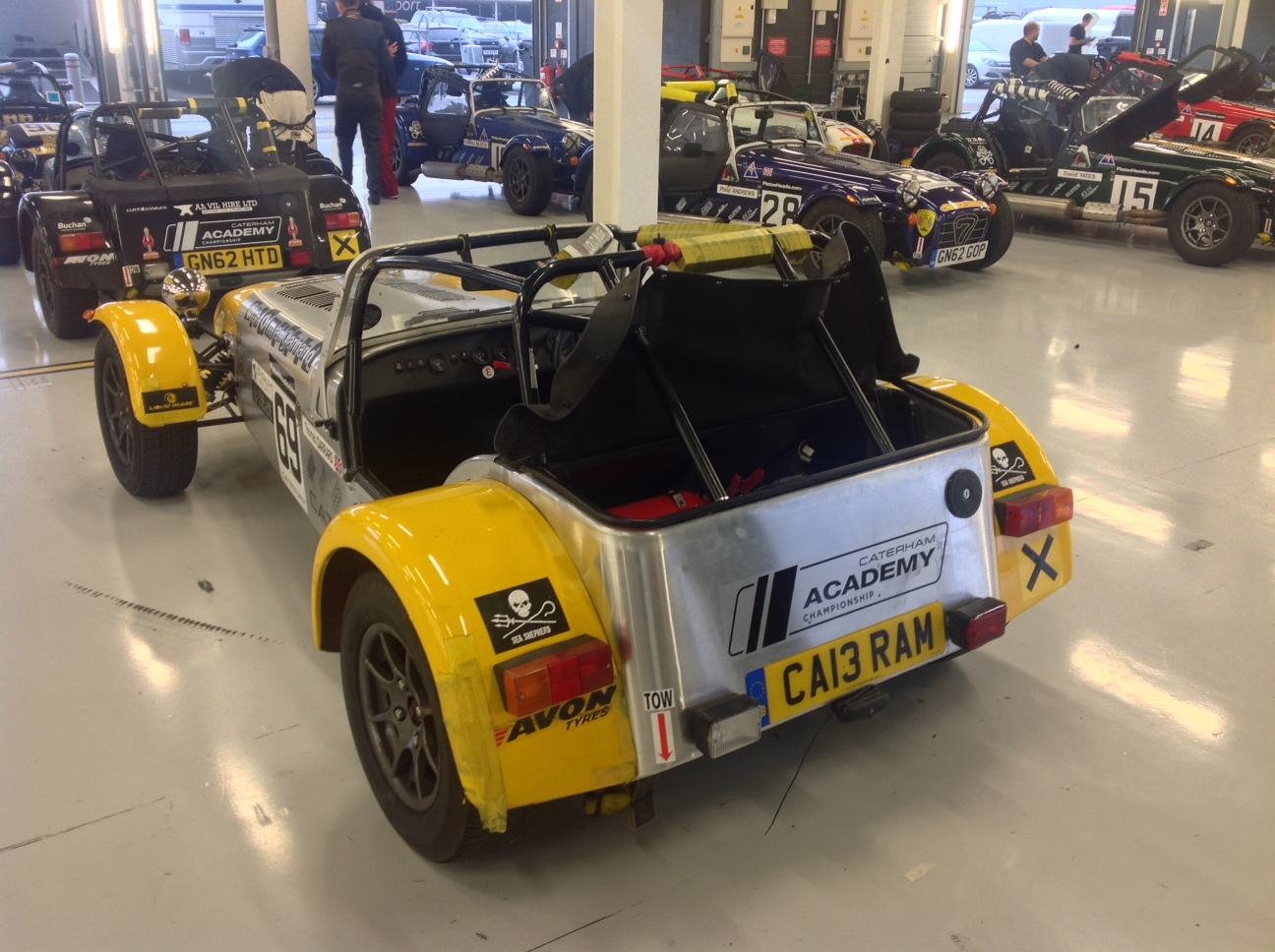
Caterham Academy Cars

In 1995 the Caterham Academy, a novices-only format, was introduced in the UK as the Caterham Scholarship. For a starting price of £24,995 (2017), entrants get a modified Roadsport kit (a factory-built option is available for extra cost) with a sealed Ford Sigma engine and 5-speed gearbox. Having completed the ARDS (racing) licence qualification, the season then consists of a car-control day, a test day, and the season starts with two sprints, and five circuit races.

Since 2000, the popularity of the Academy has led to Caterham providing two parallel Academy championships (Group 1 & Group 2), each resulting in an Academy champion at the end of the year. Approximately 1000 racing drivers have been created through the Caterham Academy.

==== Karting ====
At the Autosport International 2012 Caterham announced that it would be creating a karting series starting in 2013. It was stated that the aim of this karting series was to make it easier for people to enter motorsports by providing a cheap karting series in which they could start off.

== See also ==
- List of car manufacturers of the United Kingdom
