= Gascoyne (surname) =

Gascoyne is a surname. Notable people with the surname include:

- Chris Gascoyne (b. 1968), English actor known for his role as Peter Barlow in the soap opera Coronation Street
- Crisp Gascoyne (1700–1761), English businessman who became Lord Mayor of London
- David Gascoyne (1916–2001), English poet associated with the Surrealist movement
- Isaac Gascoyne (1763–1841), British Army officer and Tory politician
- James Gascoyne DFC (1892–1976), English World War I flying lieutenant
- James Gascoyne-Cecil, 2nd Marquess of Salisbury (1791–1868), English Conservative politician
- James Gascoyne-Cecil, 4th Marquess of Salisbury (1861–1947), Chancellor of the Duchy of Lancaster
- Joel Gascoyne (bap. 1650–1704), English chartmaker, mapmaker and surveyor
- Mike Gascoyne (b. 1963), British Formula One designer and engineer
- Thomas Gascoyne (1876–1917), English professional cycling champion
