= Canelé =

French rum and vanilla pâtisserie

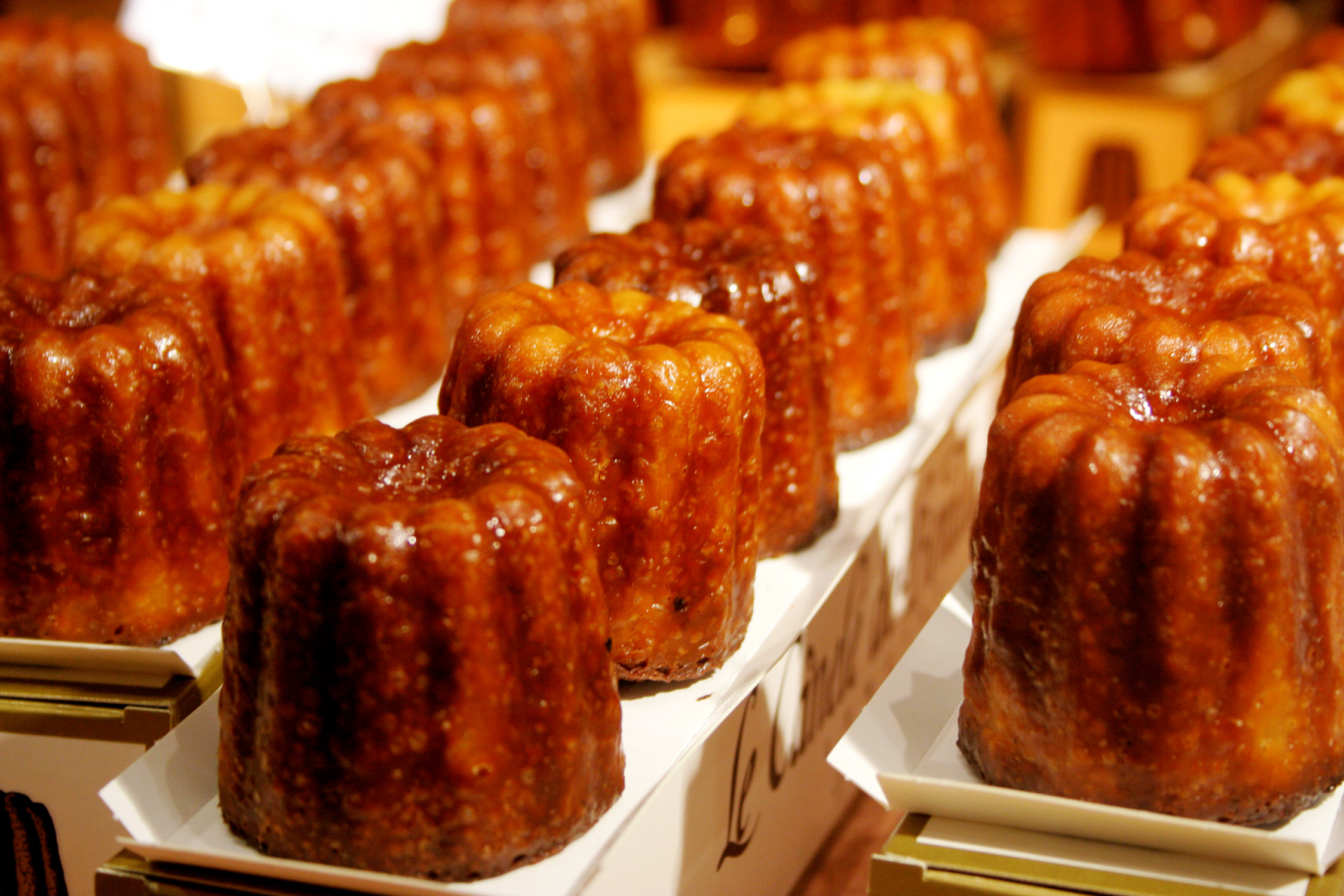
- Canelé
- Alternative names: Cannelé
- Place of origin: France
- Region or state: Bordeaux
- Created by: Couvent des Annonciades
- Serving temperature: Warm
- Main ingredients: flour, milk, egg yolk, butter, vanilla, rum, cane sugar

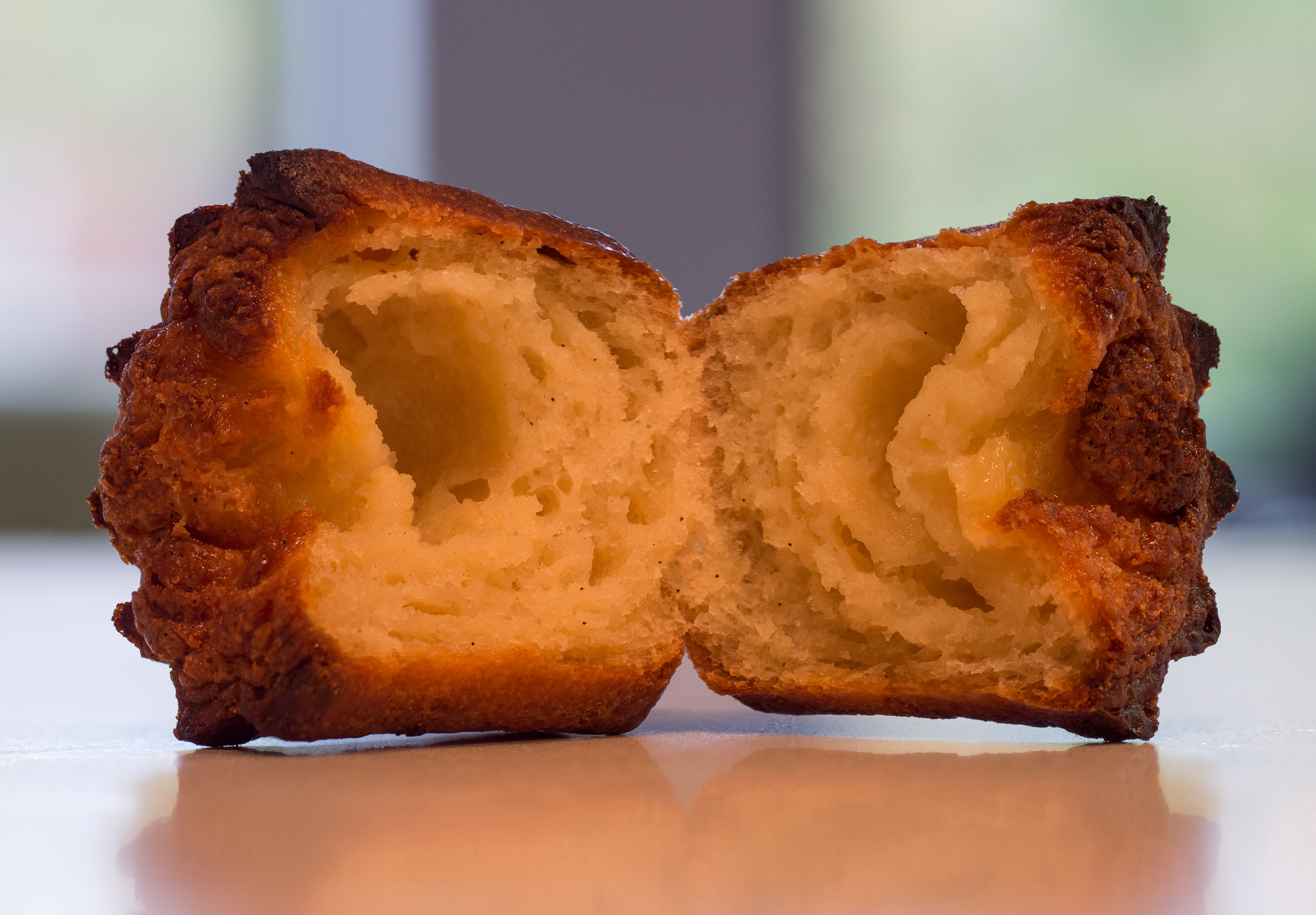
A canelé cut open, showing the contrast between exterior and interior. A large air pocket can be caused by several variables, such as excess egg white, unrested batter, or incorrect temperature.

A canelé (French: [kan.le]; Occitan: Canelat) is a small French pâtisserie flavoured with rum and vanilla, having a soft and tender centre and a dark, thick, caramelized crust. It takes the form of a small, striated cylinder up to five centimetres in height, with a depression at the top. A specialty of the region around Bordeaux in southwestern France, today it is widely available in pâtisseries in France and abroad.

== History ==
The canelé is believed to originate from the Couvent des Annonciades, Bordeaux in either the 15th or the 18th century. The modern word "canelé" originates in Gascon, which was spoken in Bordeaux and a large area of southwestern France until the 19th century.

In Limoges, there was a food called canole, a bread made with flour and egg yolks, which may be the same item as that sold in Bordeaux since the 18th century under the name of canaule, also written canaulé or canaulet. Artisans known as canauliers who specialized in baking them registered a Corporation (or guild) with the Parliament of Bordeaux in 1663, which allowed only them to produce several specific foods: Blessed bread, canaules, and Retortillons. Since they were not a part of the Pastry Corporation (Guild), which had a monopoly over baking with milk and sugar or mixtionnée dough, they were prohibited from using those ingredients. The canauliers disputed the Pastry Chefs' privileges and on 3 March 1755 the council of State in Versailles ruled for the canauliers and ended the Pastry Chefs' monopoly. An edict of 1767 limited the number of authorized canaulier shops in a city to eight. It created very strict requirements for joining the profession. Nevertheless, in 1785 there were at least 39 canaulier shops in Bordeaux, at least ten of which were in the district (faubourg) of Saint-Seurin. The French Revolution abolished all the Corporations, but later census rolls continue to show shops of Canauliers and bakers of "blessed bread".

In the first quarter of the 20th century the canelé reappeared, even if it is difficult to date exactly when. An unknown pastry chef re-popularised the antique recipe of canauliers. He added rum and vanilla to his dough. It is likely that its current shape comes from the similarity (in French) of the word wave with the word "cannelure" (fluting, corrugation, striations).

The modern name "canelé" is of recent origin. The Guide Gourmand de la France does not mention it. Only in 1985, after the pastry's popularity had begun to explode, was the Brotherhood of the Canelé of Bordeaux (Confrérie du Canelé de Bordeaux) created and the second "n" of its name removed. The name canelé became a collective brand, registered with the National Institute of Industrial Property of France by the Brotherhood. Ten years after the registration of the brand, there were at least 800 manufacturers in Aquitaine and 600 in the Gironde. In 1992, Gironde alone consumed an estimated 4.5 million canelés.

== Preparation and consumption ==
The canelé is traditionally baked in individual fluted copper molds, which are highly prized for their exceptional thermal conductivity. This property faclilitates an immediate thermal shock necessary for uniform surface caramelization, creating a crisp exterior while preserving a soft, custardy interior. The molds are traditionally brushed with beeswax. However, other coatings, such as a combination of beeswax and butter, came into use as the price of beeswax increased. Produced in numerous sizes, they can be consumed for breakfast, for snacks, and as a dessert depending in some measure on size. Canelés can be paired with red wine and many other beverages.

Traditionally, "canelés" or "cannelés of Bordeaux" are generally sold in bunches of 8 or 16. In Paris, most of the famous shops such as Ladurée and Pierre Hermé still spell it as "cannelé of Bordeaux" with double 'n'.
