= Gascoyne coast =

Gascoyne coast can mean:-

- The Western Australian fishery bioregion
- The Western Australian tourist promotion region
- The Bureau of Meteorology coastal forecast region
