= Mike Gascoyne =

British engineer and car designer (born 1963)

- Gascoyne in 2011
- Born: Michael Robert Gascoyne; 2 April 1963 (age 63); Norwich, England
- Occupation: CEO of MGI Consultancy

Michael Robert Gascoyne (born 2 April 1963) is a British former Formula One designer and engineer.

Gascoyne has worked for numerous Grand Prix teams including McLaren, Sauber, Tyrrell, Jordan (later known as Midland F1, Spyker, Force India, Racing Point and Aston Martin), Renault, Toyota, and Team Lotus, which was later renamed to Caterham F1 Team.

== Early career ==
Gascoyne was born in Rackheath, Norfolk, England. He lived in Sprowston and went to Sprowston Junior School and before moving to Old Catton. He went to Wymondham College from 1974 to 1981. Although he gained admission to study for a PhD in fluid dynamics at Cambridge University (Churchill College) from 1982 to 1988, he gaining a series of degrees but started working before graduating with a PhD. He was, however, active in his college Boat Club, as a successful coxswain of Churchill's leading women's crew. After leaving Cambridge in 1988 he briefly worked for Westland System Assessment Limited, part of Westland Helicopters, but maintained a keen desire to work in motor sport.

== Formula One career ==
=== Early roles ===
In 1989 he joined McLaren as a wind tunnel aerodynamicist but only remained with the team for a single year before joining Tyrrell, who at the time were enjoying something of a renaissance with Frenchman Jean Alesi at the wheel of the 019 chassis.

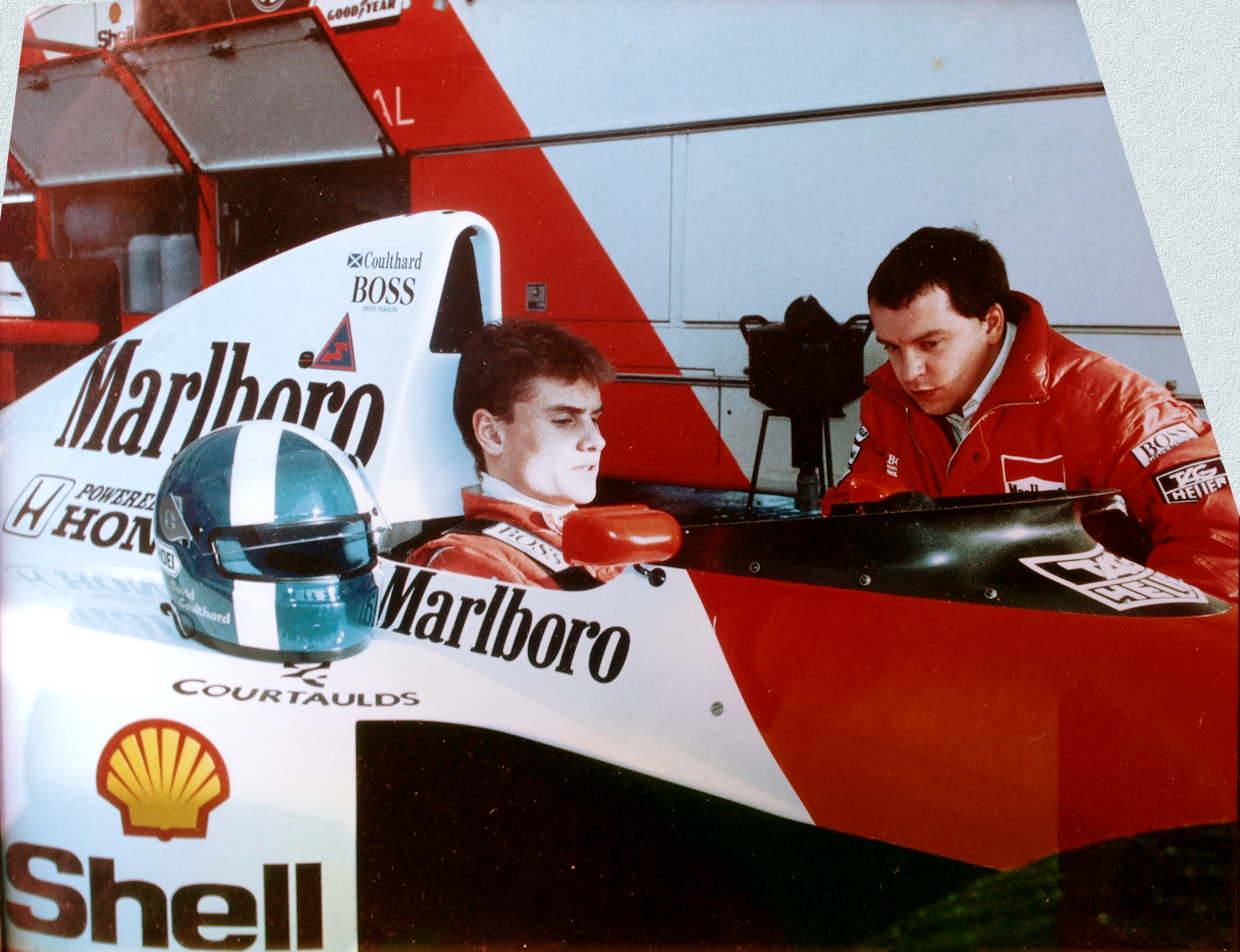
Gascoyne engineering David Coulthard at his Autosport test

While at Tyrrell he worked for designer Harvey Postlethwaite, who came to hold Gascoyne in such regard that when Postlethwaite departed in 1991 to design the Sauber team's first Formula One car, he took the twenty-eight-year-old engineer with him to Switzerland. Postlethwaite's stay with the Sauber team was short, but Gascoyne remained for the first season, his Sauber C13 chassis taking 12 points during 1993.

In late 1993 Postlethwaite returned to Tyrrell and invited Gascoyne to become deputy technical director responsible for the design of the team's 1994 car. Gascoyne accepted and remained with the team for four years, although lack of money severely limited his ability to produce a competitive racing car. When Ken Tyrrell announced his intention to sell to British American Tobacco, Gascoyne was forced to leave in the knowledge that the renamed British American Racing was to employ Malcolm Oastler as technical director.

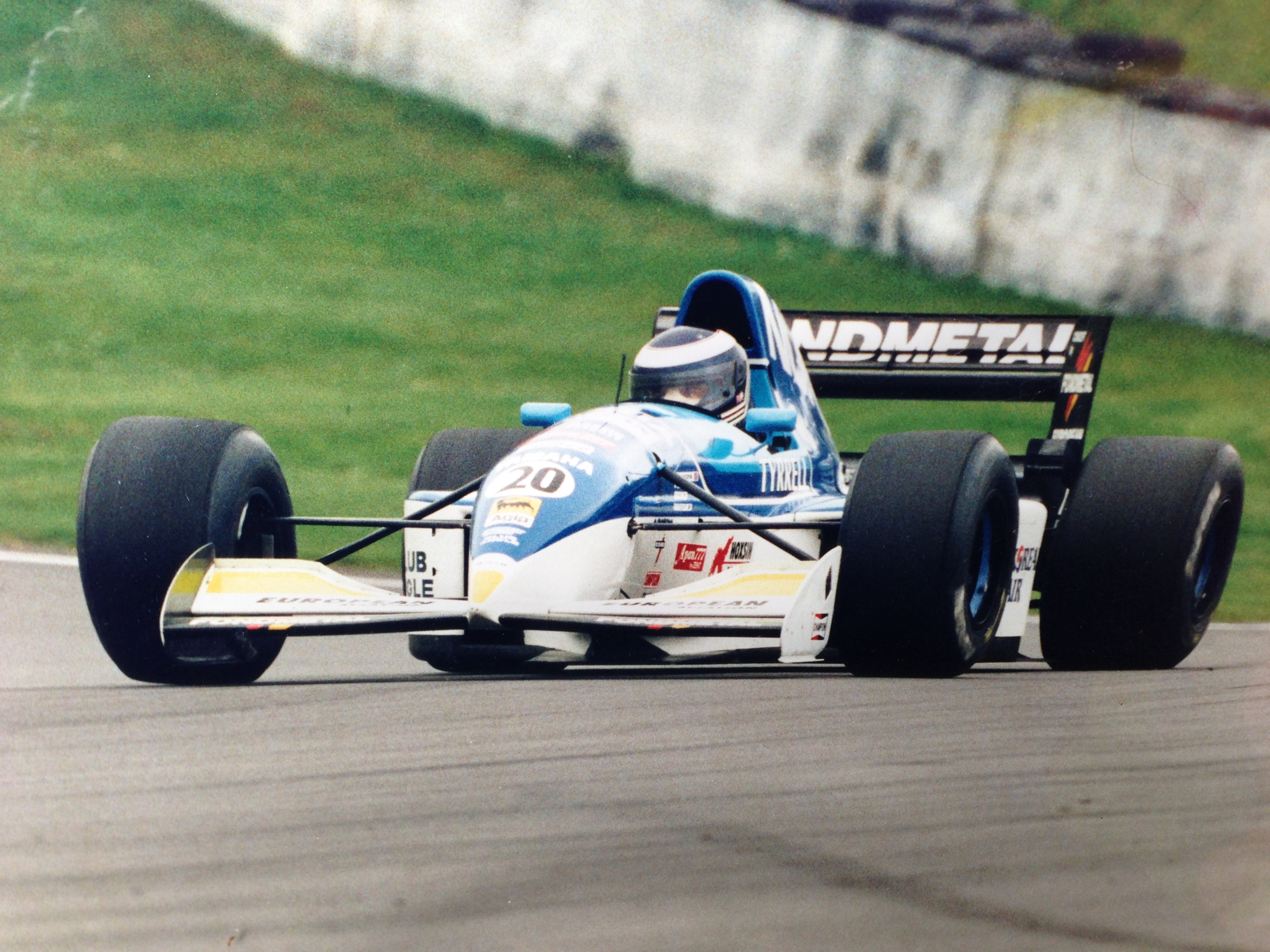
Gascoyne driving a Tyrrell F1 car in the BOSS GP series

=== Jordan Grand Prix ===
In June 1998 Gascoyne joined Jordan Grand Prix as technical director replacing Gary Anderson and immediately set about designing their 1999 car. The season was the team's most successful in its history, finishing third in the Constructors Championship and taking two race victories.

=== Benetton/Renault F1 ===
Shortly before the start of the 2001 season he moved to Benetton, whose results had been in serious decline since the mid-1990s. Gascoyne's two-and-a-half seasons with Benetton, and later Renault, saw a marked improvement in the team's fortunes, culminating in victory at the 2003 Hungarian Grand Prix. By now however, the highly rated technical director had already been placed on gardening leave by his French employers pending a move to Toyota F1 for an undisclosed financial settlement.

=== Toyota ===
In December 2003 Gascoyne made his move to the Cologne base of Toyota and began working on the 2004 car. With Formula One design timelines stretching back many months before the start of the season, he was unable to have full influence over many early decisions and the season proved to be a disappointment. The 2005 season was Toyota's most successful Formula One season by far, as they scored points in all but the opening race and the controversial United States Grand Prix, where Trulli qualified in pole position but like all the drivers using Michelin tyres, retired before the start of the race. Gascoyne's aim for 2006 was high and the team's first victory and the championship were the next two steps. The early stages of the 2006 season proved to be average, with the team struggling with the late switch to Bridgestone tyres and the new V8 engines. Many observers had predicted race wins and possibly even a title challenge.

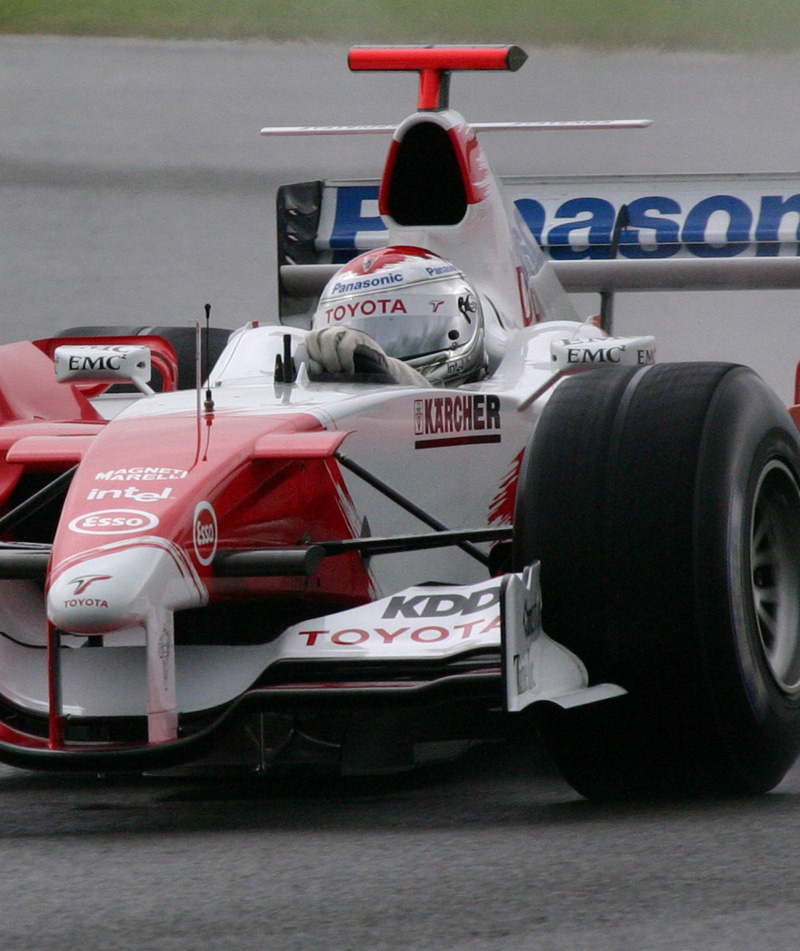
Jarno Trulli 2005 Toyota TF105

Toyota surprised the Formula One community by dropping Gascoyne from their technical department after the Melbourne race where Ralf Schumacher finished 3rd on the podium, especially as the Englishman had contributed to their rise in competitiveness during 2005. However, the poor performances of the TF106 in the opening two races of the season, particularly in Bahrain where the team had finished on the podium 12 months earlier, prompted disagreement over the team's technical direction. Gascoyne disliked the corporate way the team's management operated while team management were unimpressed by the TF106 car Gascoyne had produced and he was duly dismissed.

Although he made no immediate comment, the Toyota team issued a statement citing a "fundamental difference of opinion with regard to the technical operations" and that Gascoyne had been suspended until further notice. On 6 April Gascoyne and Toyota parted company "amicably". Pascal Vasselon became temporary technical director with immediate effect.

=== Spyker/Force India ===
In September 2006 Gascoyne was signed by Spyker F1 as chief technology officer. He took up his new position in November 2006.

An updated version of the F8-VII chassis was introduced at the 2007 Turkish Grand Prix. It was the first Spyker car designed by Gascoyne and he stated the new car could be up to three-quarters of a second per lap faster than the original F8-VII.

In 2008, Spyker became the Force India team after its sale to Vijay Mallya. Gascoyne continued as chief technology officer.

On 7 November 2008 it was announced that Gascoyne would no longer play any formal role at the team, with Force India owner Vijay Mallya taking full responsibility for running the team.

=== Lotus F1 Racing/Team Lotus/Caterham Group (2009–2015) ===
In 2009 Gascoyne was part of plans by the Litespeed F3 team to enter Formula One in 2010, under the Team Lotus name. They failed to gain entry, but Gascoyne continued to work on the plans and got backing from the Malaysian government to form Lotus Racing. The team gained entry for the 2010 season in September 2009. Throughout several name changes the team is now called Caterham F1 Team and on 29 September 2010 it was announced that Gascoyne had signed an extension to his contract, tying him to the Caterham group until 2015.

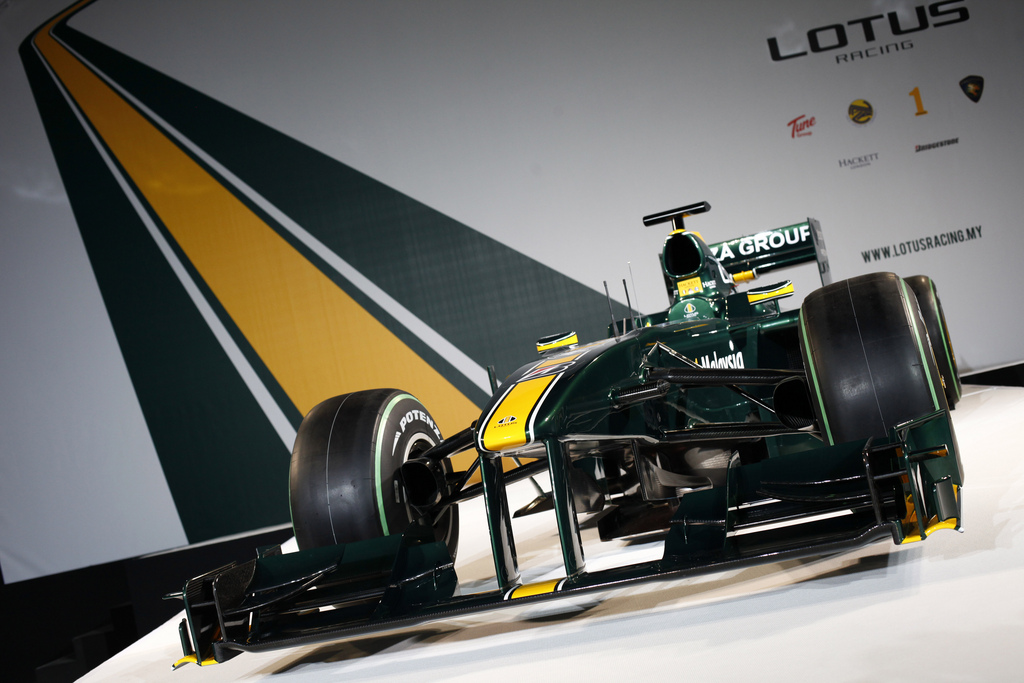
Lotus racing T127 launch

==== Caterham Technology and Caterham Composites ====
In February 2012 Gascoyne stepped away from the daily running of the F1 side and became chief technical officer of the Caterham Group, with his daily focus on his role as CEO of Caterham Technology and Caterham Composites, using his experience in Formula 1 engineering and project management to develop competitive turn-key solutions for the automotive, marine and aviation industry.

==== Caterham Le Mans Project ====
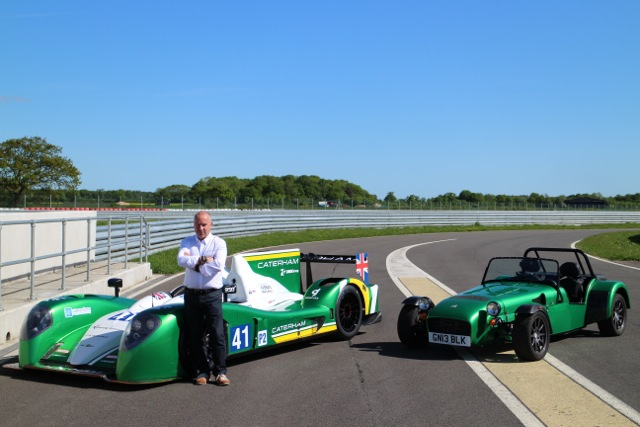
Caterham Le Mans Project

On 3 June, the Caterham Group announced it would be entering the 2013 Le Mans 24hr race in the LMP2 Class in collaboration with Greaves Motorsport. Caterham personnel would be led by Caterham Technology CEO Gascoyne as part of an evaluation of an entry into the customer prototype market with the idea to apply areas of expertise to a customer Sports Prototype programme in future. The interest of the Caterham Group in international endurance racing follows the setting up of a 50/50 joint venture with historic French manufacturer Alpine to develop a new road-going sports car. Gascoyne and Caterham Technology are leading the design of a car that will be available as a Caterham and an Alpine when it goes on sale in 2016.

== MGI Engineering Ltd ==
MGI Engineering is a company founded by Gascoyne in 2003 originally under the name of MGI Motorsport with facilities based in Oxfordshire, UK. The company's main focus is in developing lightweight composite solutions for application in the aerospace, motorsport, automotive and marine sectors. In recent years the company has increasingly focused on the electric vehicle and sustainability markets with a focus on developing technical solutions for electric flight by applying technologies, systems and agile processes from F1 to the development of eVtol aircraft.

=== Class 40 racing program ===
On 15 May 2013 MGI announced that Caterham Technology and Caterham Composites, had joined with MGI CEO Gascoyne and MGI Sailing Director Brian Thompson to run a Class40 offshore racing campaign under the banner of 'Caterham Challenge'.

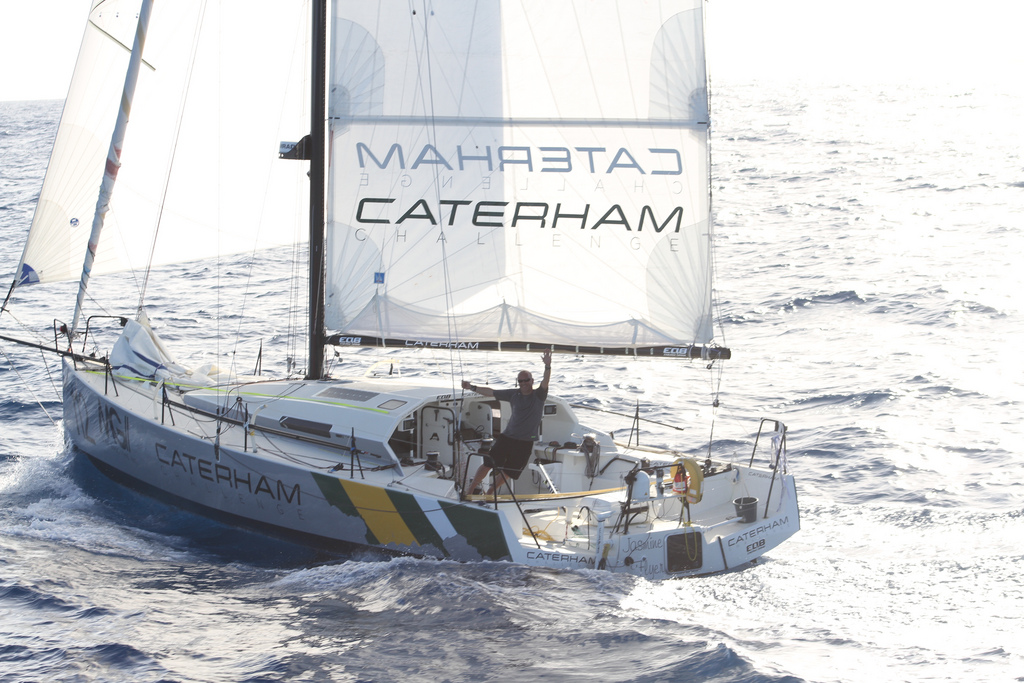
Gascoyne sailing Class 40 Caterham Challenge – arrival

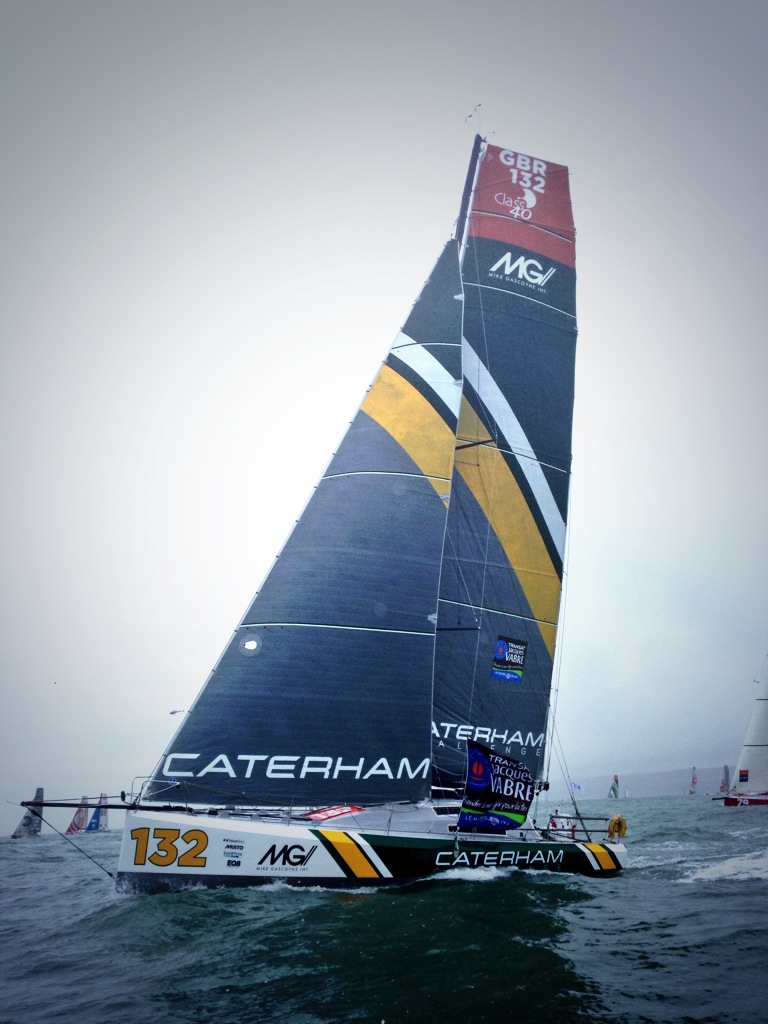
Class 40 Caterham Challenge

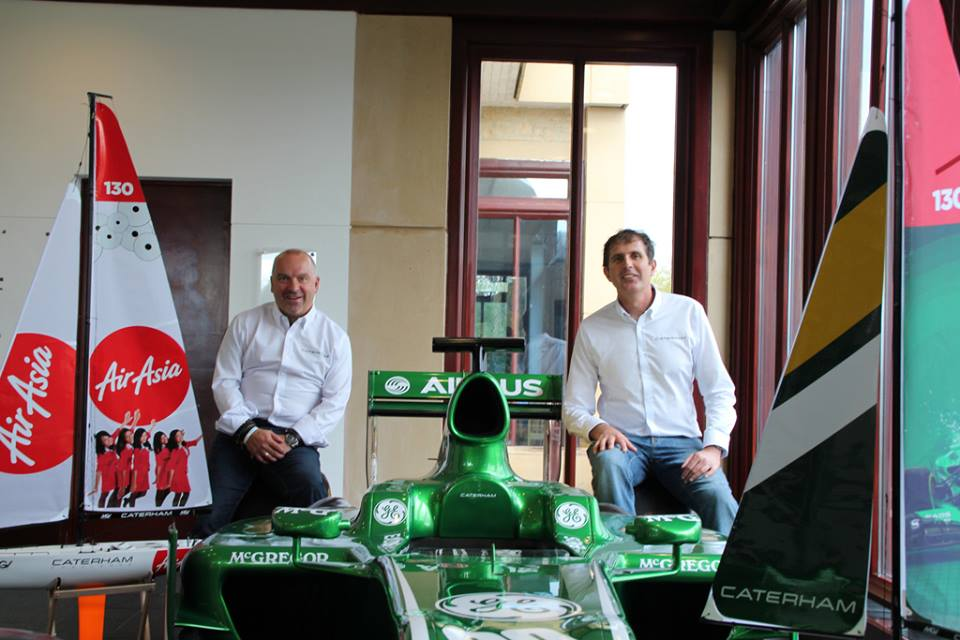
Class 40 Caterham Challenge team launch

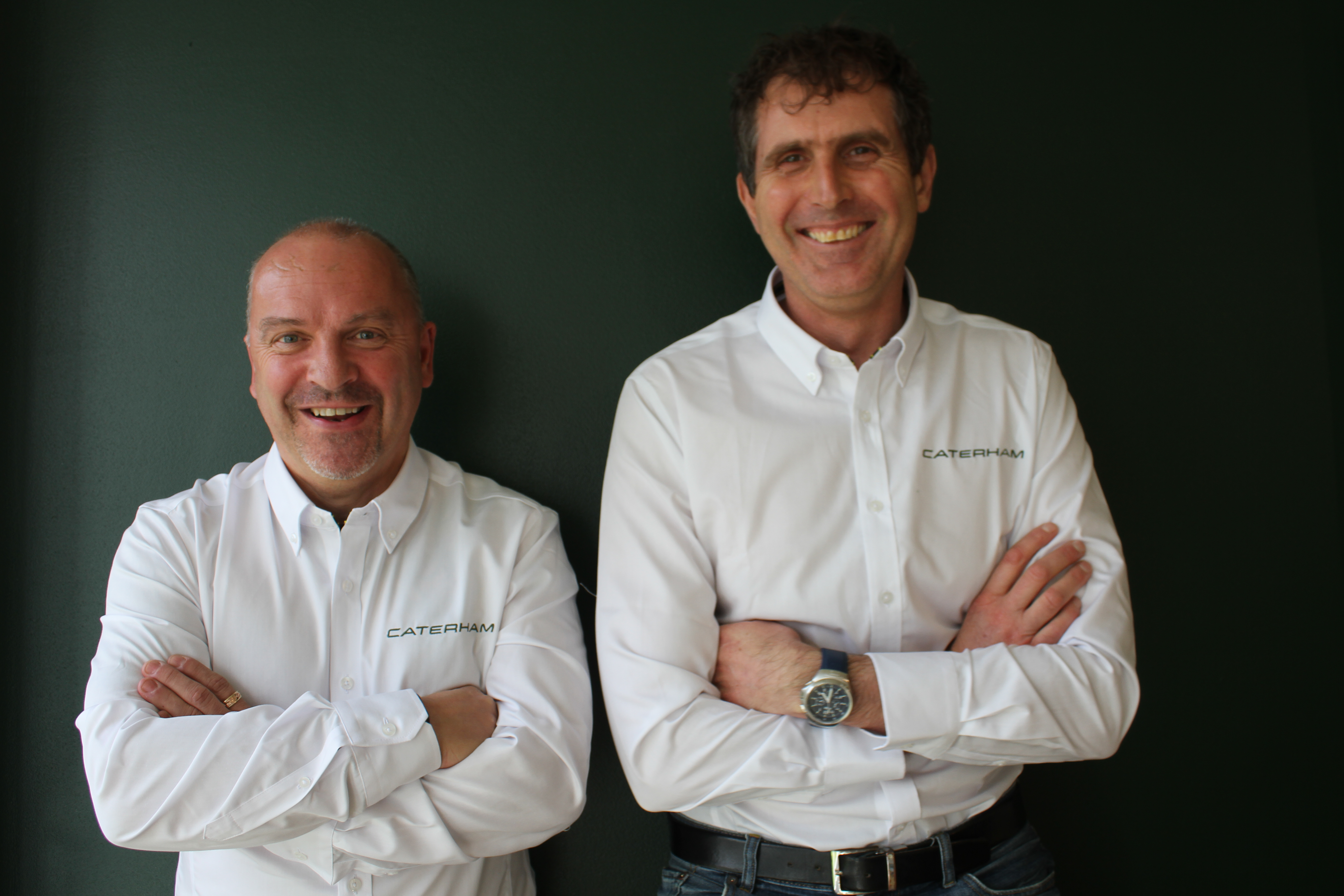
Gascoyne and Brian Thompson

This two-year campaign followed on from Gascoyne's successful 2012 solo transatlantic aboard a 'Caterham Challenge' branded Class40.

The campaign objectives were to bring F1 standards of technology and logistics to off-shore racing, to encourage green, sustainable and reusable energy technologies in the marine, automotive and aerospace sectors and to utilize Caterham's extensive experience in F1, R&D, engineering, competitive sailing and sports marketing. MGI built an Akilara RC3 Class40 named Silvi Belle 2 and launched the racing boat in late August. The racing yacht was first on public display during the Southampton boatshow 2013 followed by sailing and training in The Solent and the English Channel. Silvi Belle 2 started at the Transat Jacques Vabre on 7 November 2013 under the name of Caterham Challenge with Gascoyne as skipper and Brian Thompson as co-skipper, leaving Le Havre, France for Itajai, Brazil.

==== Rolex Fastnet Race 2015 ====
In 2015, the Class 40 racing yacht Silvi Belle 2, Sail Number GBR 132, sailed by a crew of 4 consisting of Gascoyne (skipper), Phil Sharp, James French and Adrian Kuttel finished 3rd in the 2015 edition of the Rolex Fastnet race.

The team crossed the finish line in Plymouth on 20 August 2015 at 00:27:10, having completed the 608 miles in 3 days 12:17:10 throughout a mixed weather of very light winds and strong currents at the start and strong winds and choppy seas on the way back from the Rock.

Silvi Belle 2 led the Class 40 fleet around the Fastnet Rock when it passed the landmark on 19 August at 00:41:07.

== Other activities ==
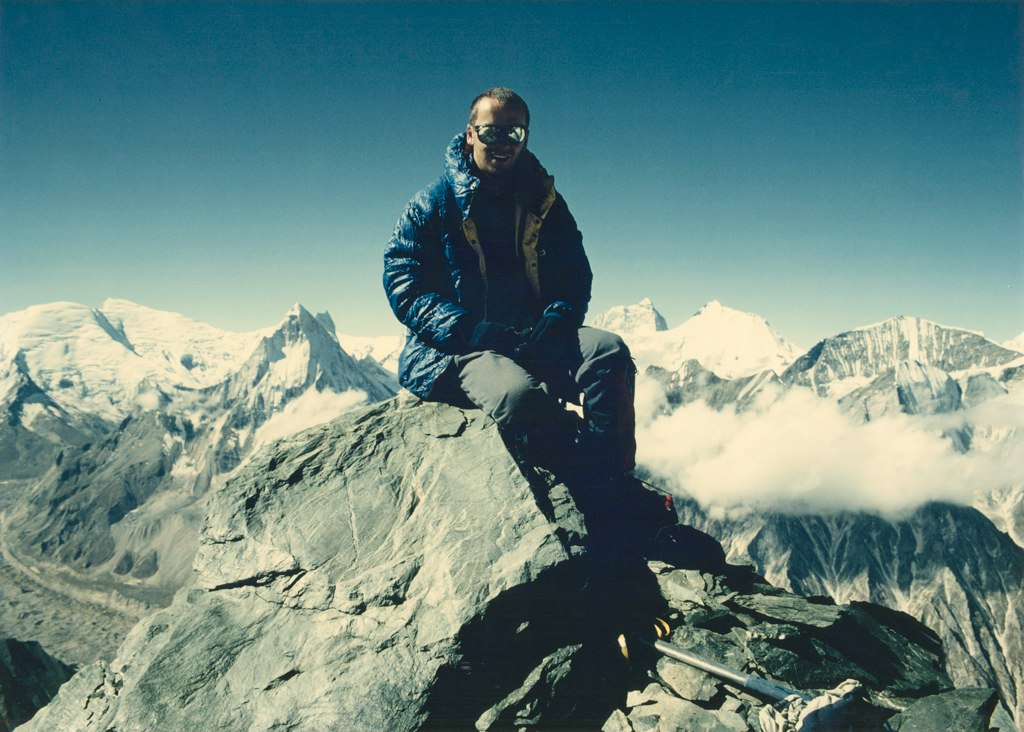
Gascoyne during one of 2 Himalaya expeditions

During his time at the Churchill College in Cambridge Gascoyne led 2 climbing expeditions in the Himalaya (1986–1987, climbing both the Bandarpunch and Sudarshan Parbat) followed by a new-found interest in paragliding (1989–1992). Gascoyne raced Formula 1 cars for 4 races in the BOSS GP series in 1999; the Tyrrell 022 and Tyrrell 025, both of which he designed himself during his time at Tyrrell, finishing 3rd at Brands Hatch. Following his love for competitive extreme sport Gascoyne fulfilled another lifelong dream by sailing solo non-stop 3200 miles across the Atlantic in 2012. He crossed the Atlantic on a Class40 racing yacht leaving Cascais (Portugal) on 28 November 2012 and arriving in Grenada (Caribbean) on 14 December 2012.

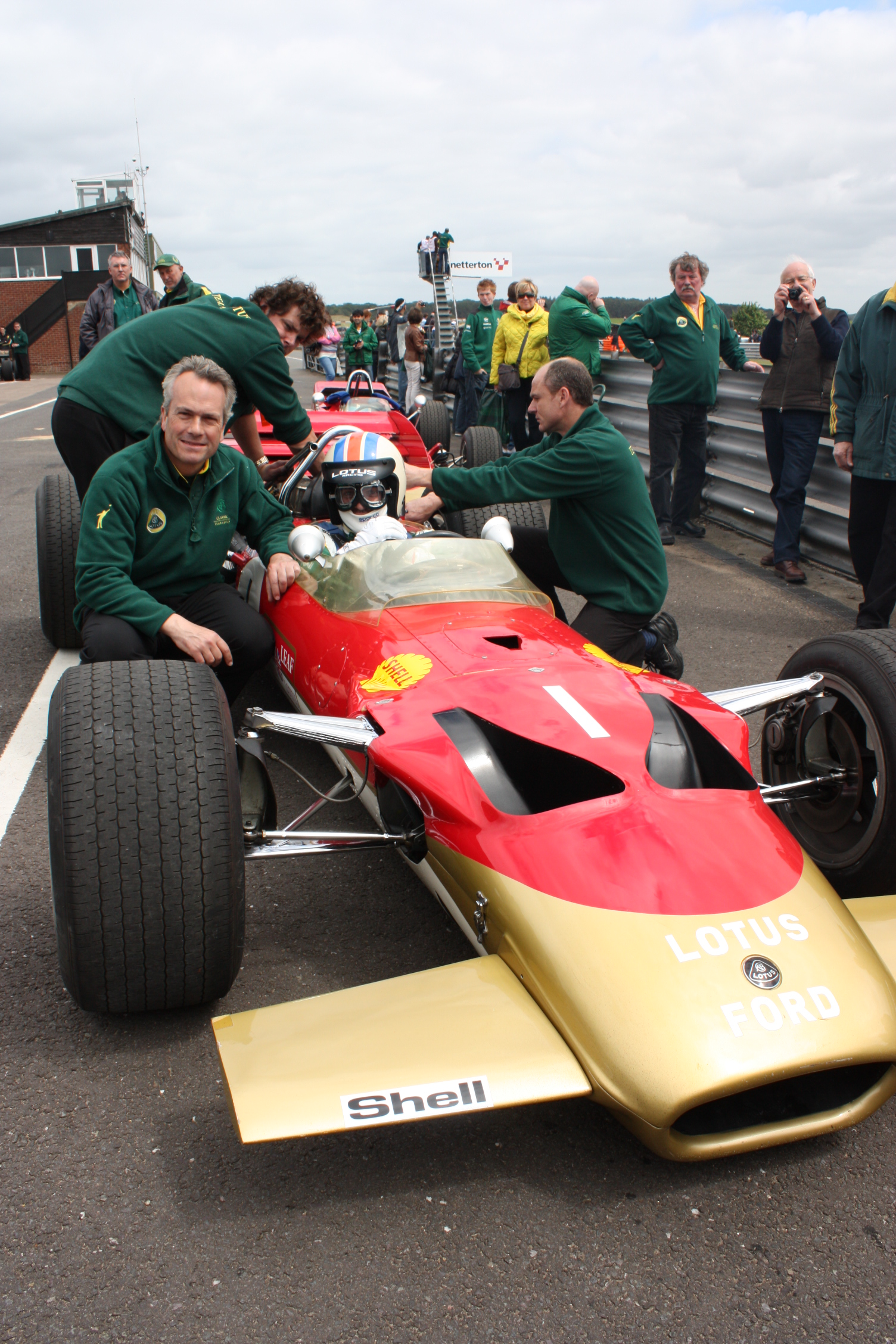
Gascoyne driving a classic Gold Leaf Lotus 49B at Snetterton

Gascoyne writes columns for several magazines. He has appeared in TV shows on Sky Sports F1, commentated for BBC Radio 5 Live Sports Extra on the 2009 Malaysian Grand Prix and temporarily replaced Eddie Jordan on the BBC One coverage of the 2009 Chinese Grand Prix. In 2011, Gascoyne became president of the Cambridge Granta Cricket Club, being a passionate cricket fan and player himself.

== Personal life ==
Gascoyne's nickname "the rottweiler" originates from his time at Tyrrell working under his mentor Harvey Postlethwaite. Gascoyne was originally called "Harvey's pit bull" by a truckie called "Jolly" but this was later changed to "the rottweiler" and has stuck with him ever since.
