= Gascoyne-Cecil =

Gascoyne-Cecil is a surname, and may refer to:

- Georgina Gascoyne-Cecil, Marchioness of Salisbury (1827–1899), Lady of the Royal Order of Victoria and Albert
- James Gascoyne-Cecil, 2nd Marquess of Salisbury (1791–1868), English Conservative politician
- James Gascoyne-Cecil, 4th Marquess of Salisbury (1861–1947), Chancellor of the Duchy of Lancaster
- Jonathan Hugh Gascoyne-Cecil (1939–2011), known as Jonathan Cecil, English theatre, film and television actor
- Lord Edward Gascoyne-Cecil (1867–1918), British soldier and colonial administrator in Egypt
- Robert Gascoyne-Cecil, 3rd Marquess of Salisbury (1830–1903), British statesman and Prime Minister
- Robert Gascoyne-Cecil, 5th Marquess of Salisbury (1893–1972), prominent Tory politician
- Robert Gascoyne-Cecil, 6th Marquess of Salisbury (1916–2003), Conservative Member of Parliament for Bournemouth West
- Robert Gascoyne-Cecil, 7th Marquess of Salisbury (born 1946), Conservative politician
- William Gascoyne-Cecil (1863–1936), Bishop of Exeter
