= Caterham-Lola SP/300.R =

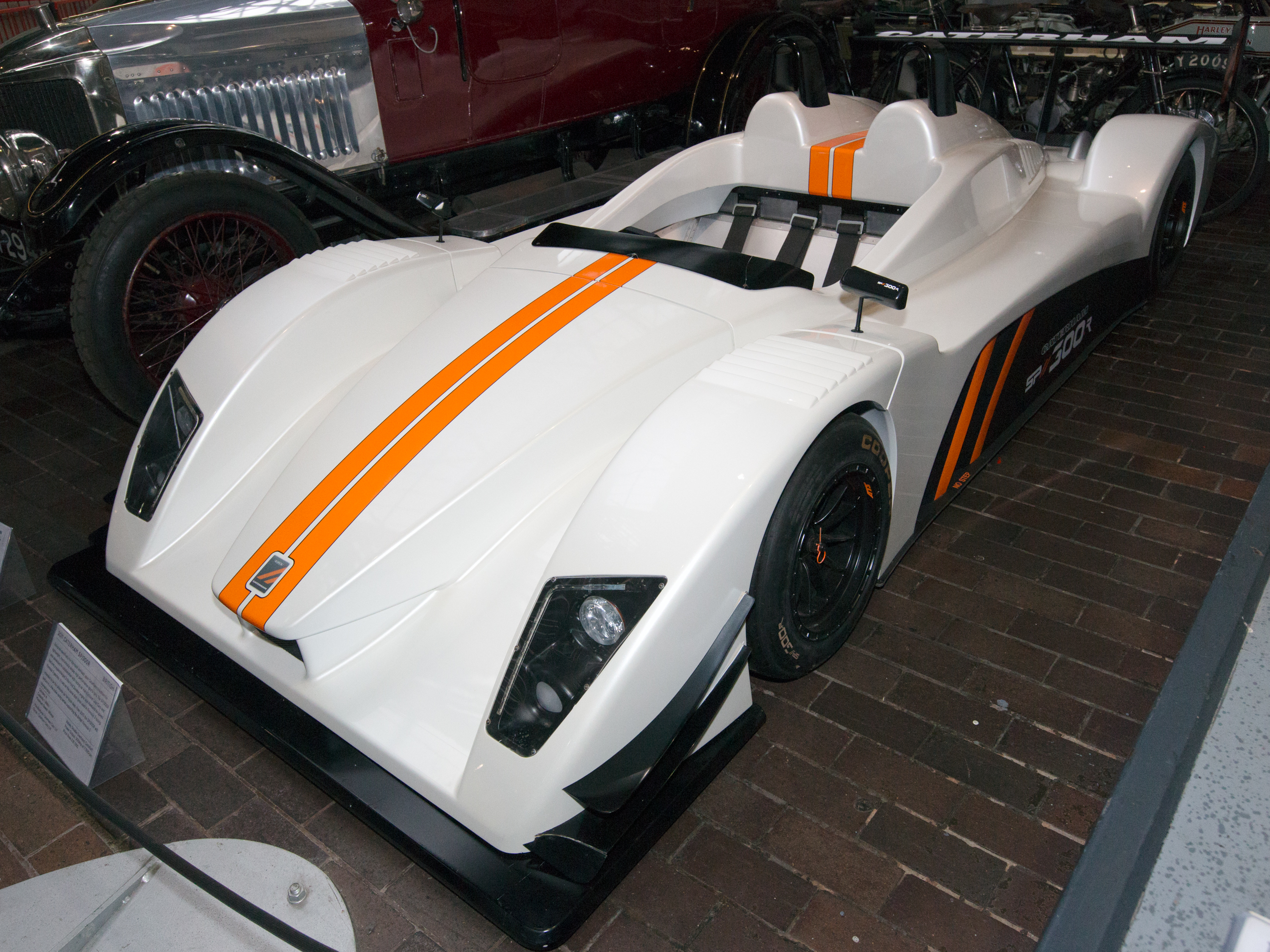

Overview
- Manufacturer: Caterham Cars Ltd and Lola Cars (jointly-built)

Body and chassis
- Chassis: Aluminium honeycomb monocoque

Powertrain
- Engine: 1999cc Rotrex supercharged Ford Duratec, 16-valve inline-four
- Transmission: Hewland Six-speed sequential manual

Dimensions
- Length: 4200 mm
- Width: 1700 mm
- Height: 1015 mm
- Curb weight: 545 kg

Chronology
- Predecessor: Lola B08/90

The Caterham-Lola SP/300.R, or simply SP/300.R, is a track-only, open roof car designed by Caterham Cars alongside Lola Cars. The SP/300.R is a limited edition with limited production to 25 per annum.

The car is based on the Lola B08/90 Sports 2000 car and features an aluminium alloy monocoque chassis, that is shared with the Lola B08/90, which means that it is significantly lighter than its steel tube frame rivals. Caterham turned to Lola for their CFD expertise in designing LMP cars to help design a body that is inspired by LeMans Prototypes.

== History ==
The SP/300.R's design was inspired by Lola's LMP cars, with sectioned body panels that can easily be removed in the pits, and a massive front splitter and rear diffuser to help produce downforce.

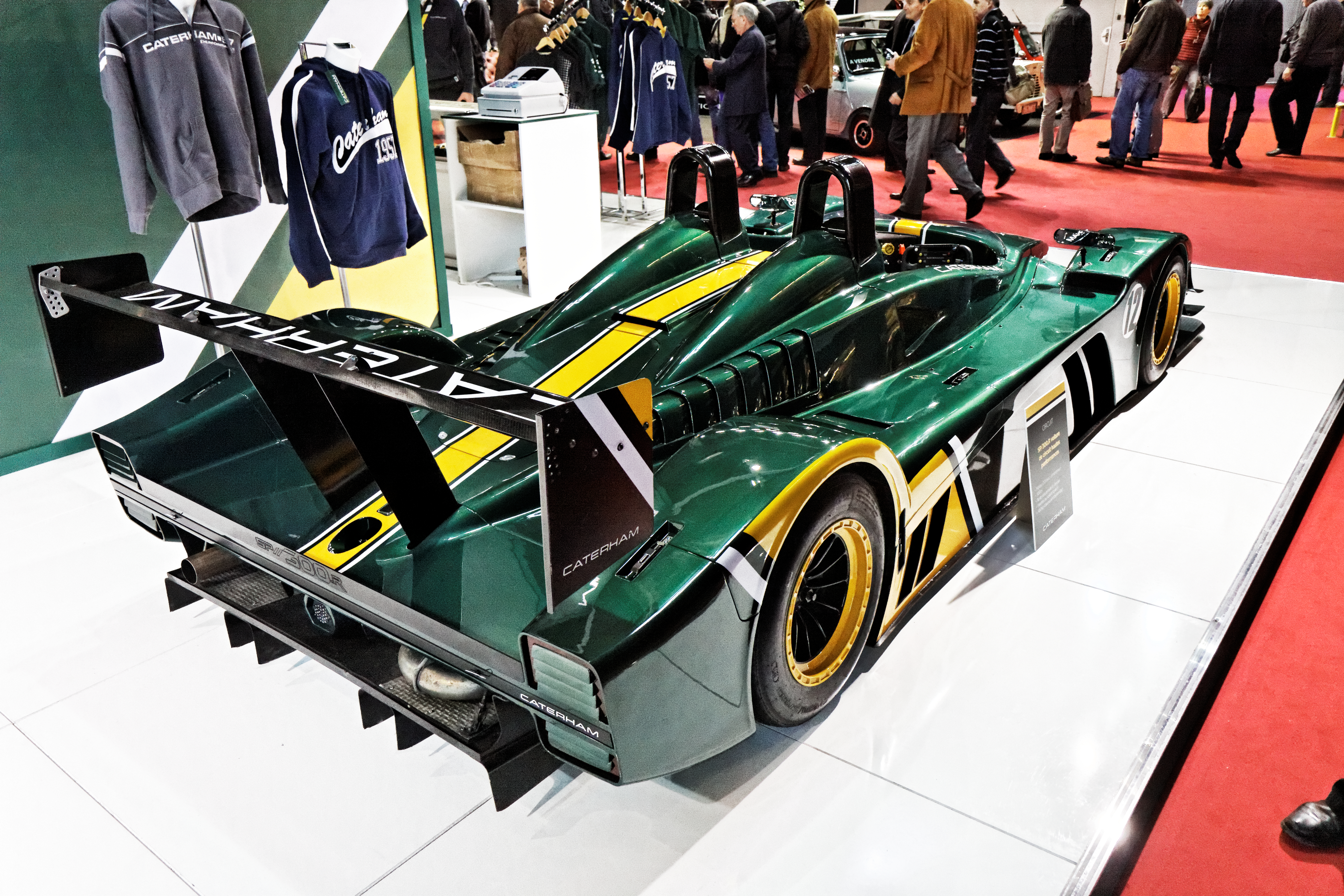
Rear view

As with all other current Caterham products, the SP/300.R is powered by a 2.0-liter Ford Duratec engine that is supercharged and tuned by Caterham to produce around 300 hp (224 kW) at 7500 rpm and 213 lb⋅ft (289 N⋅m) at 7500 rpm. It has a sequentially paddle shifted transmission from Hewland, built to Lola's specification. Caterham has states that the SP/300.R is projected to weigh less than 600 kg (1,320 lb), which, according to Caterham, allows the car to accelerate to 60 mph in 2.8 seconds, and reach a (gearing limited) top speed of 180 mph (290 km/h).

Distribution rights for the car in the United States were held by Chris Dyson.

=== Racing ===
The Caterham-Lola SP/300.R was originally developed for a one-off race championship that started in 2012, which took place in the United Kingdom. In 2019, the SP/300.R again debuted in the 2019 French Grand Prix.
