= Gascon campaign =

Gascon campaign may refer to several military conflicts between English and French forces:

- Gascon campaign (1294–1303)
- Gascon campaign of 1345
- Gascon campaign of 1442
- Gascon campaign of 1450–1453
