= Gascogne =

Gascogne may refer to:

== Geography ==
- Gascony (French Gascogne), a region and former province of France
  - Côtes de Gascogne, a wine-growing area of Gascony
  - Golfe de Gascogne, an alternative name for the Bay of Biscay

== People ==
- Matthias Gascogne, a 16th-century French composer
- Severus de Gascogne, a suggested Duke of Aquitaine

== Other ==
- French battleship Gascogne (1914), a Normandie-class battleship of the French Navy.
- Basset Bleu de Gascogne, a breed of dog
- Grand Bleu de Gascogne, a breed of dog
- Petit Bleu de Gascogne, a breed of dog
- Griffon Bleu de Gascogne, a breed of dog
- Floc de Gascogne, an apéritif

== See also ==
- Gascoigne
