= Gascon pig =

Breed of pig

Gascon
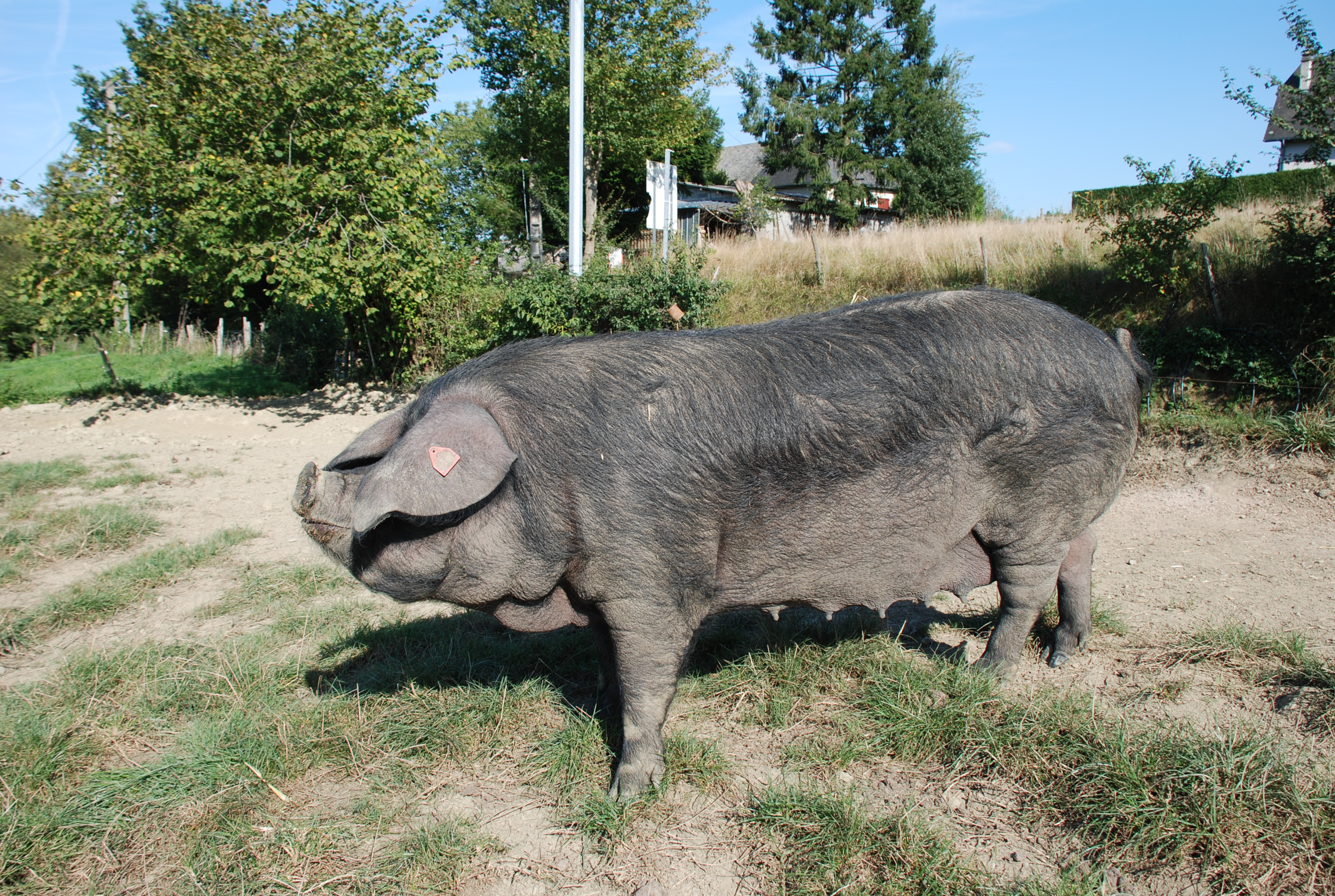
- Sow of the Gascon breed
- Conservation status: endangered
- Country of origin: France

Traits

The Gascon is a rare breed of domestic pig which has survived in the more mountainous and remote regions of France. In the Midi-Pyrénées region, the Gascon survives as probably the most ancient breed of pig in France.

Unsuited to large-scale commercial production, the numbers of black Gascon pigs dwindled until, in the 1980s, there were only a couple of males and 34 females alive. A focus on the breed's uniqueness has helped to recover the numbers, and by 2020 there were 8,000 born in that year.

Despite its endangered status, it has many valuable characteristics. Like most old-fashioned breeds, it is prone to becoming very fat, but it is vigorous, hardy, thrifty and tolerant of hot climates. The sows are prolific and have a good supply of milk for their litters.
