= Fenzi (surname) =

Family name

Fenzi is an Italian surname. Notable people with the surname include:

- The Fenzi family, influential in Florence in the 18th and 19th centuries
  - Emanuele Fenzi (1784–1875), Italian banker, iron producer, and concessionaire of the Livorno–Florence railway
- Emanuele Orazio Fenzi (1843–1924), birth name of Italian-born horticulturist, known in the United States as Francesco Franceschi

== See also ==
- Palazzo Fenzi, palace in Florence, Italy
- Franceschi Park, park in Santa Barbara, California, bearing the American namesake of Emanuele Orazio Fenzi
