= Villa Rusciano =

Coordinates: 43°45′34.98″N 11°16′40.53″E

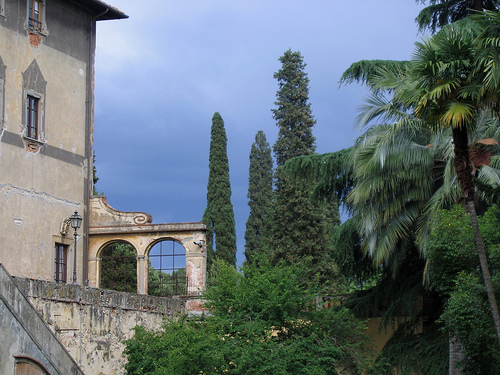
Gardens of the Villa

Villa Rusciano is a historic villa in the neighbourhood of Florence, central Italy, which includes work by Brunelleschi.

== Description and history ==
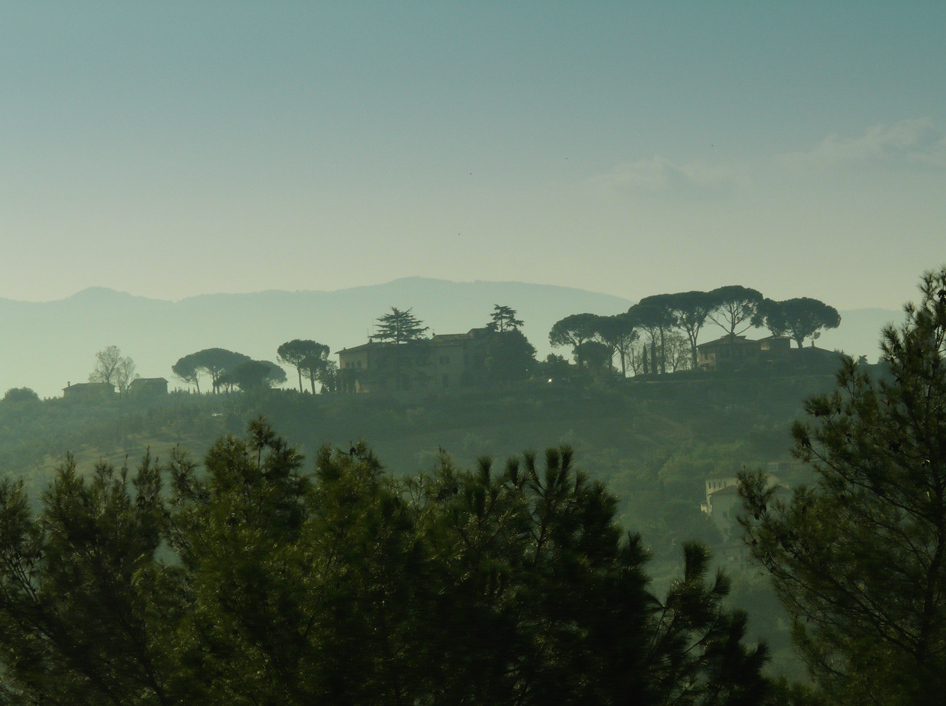
View from Rusciano towards Florence

Set in a hilly area on the outskirts of Florence, the Villa name is derived from the area, once an agricultural estate. The villa was cited by Franco Sacchetti in Trecentonovelle, and once belonged to the Salviati family.

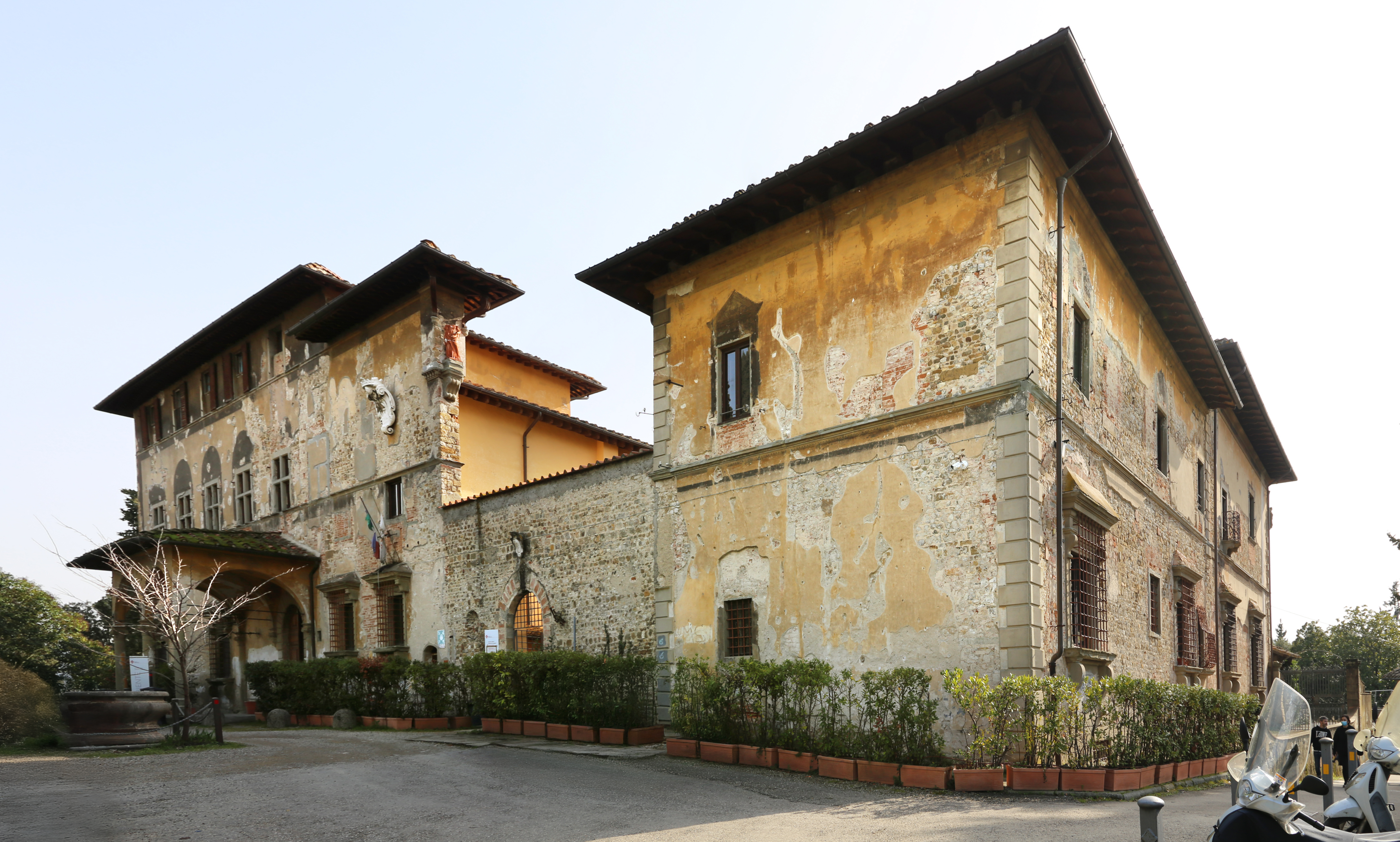
Villa di Rusciano

In the mid-15th century, Luca Pitti bought the estate and had it restructured by Filippo Brunelleschi. The original project was not fully completed. Of this project only the huge staircase and decorative parts of the inner courtyard and interiors remain. Inside there is also a della Robbia sculpture with cherubs. (Note: The identity of the particular member of the della Robbia family of sculptors who created this piece does not seem to be recorded.)

The garden has a panoramic terrace with cypress trees. It was in these gardens that Francesco Franceschi Fenzi first discovered his passion for plants.

In 1472 it was bought by the Florentine Republic and granted as residence to Federico III da Montefeltro, Duke of Urbino, Captain General of the armed forces. The villa had several other owners. Among other prestigious Florentine owners was Emanuele Fenzi and his family, later bequeathed to Leone and Ida Fenzi.

== Sources ==
- Il Posseso di Rusciano
- Il “Quinto Liceo Scientifico” - Giovanni Giovannini
- Un Ricordo del Liceo “Gobetti” - Mercurio Candela
