= Luca Pitti =

Florentine banker

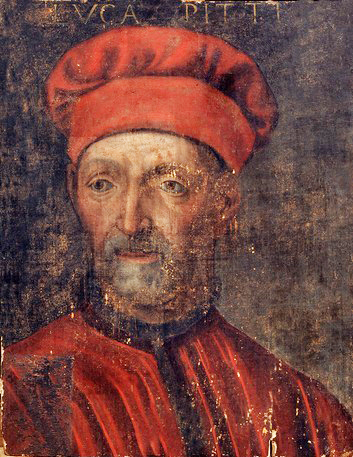
- Portrait of Luca Pitti at Kursk Art Gallery

Banker
- President: Cosimo de' Medici

Magistrate of Florence

Personal details
- Born: 1398 Florence, Republic of Florence
- Died: 1472 (aged 73–74) Republic of Florence

Luca Pitti (1398–1472) was a Florentine banker during the period of the republic presided over by Cosimo de' Medici. He was awarded a knighthood, and received lavish presents from both the Signoria of Florence and the Medici family as a reward for helping maintain the government during the last years of Cosimo's rule when Cosimo was too old and feeble to maintain power alone.

As the head magistrate of Florence, known as "The Gonfalonier of Justice," he wielded great power and influence. In August, 1458, he staged a coup to seize control of Florentine government in the name of its existing ruler, the elderly and now frail Cosimo de' Medici. In effect he wished to strengthen the existing government, as a result many leading citizens were banished, and many other citizens were driven from power. The newly formed government was to last eight years with Cosimo as its figurehead, the reality being he was too frail to maintain power alone. Pitti's chief opponent at this time was Girolamo Machiavelli who was banished. However, he travelled the neighbouring principalities whipping up opposition to the new Florentine government. He was consequently declared a rebel, betrayed and returned to Florence where he mysteriously died in prison.

Pitti was then ennobled and very wealthy indeed, Niccolò Machiavelli in his History of Florence estimates no less a sum than twenty thousand ducats was presented to him.

It was then that he sought to rival the glory, if not power, of the Medici and began construction of the Palazzo Pitti intended to rival the palazzo of the Medici. He also began work on a villa at Rusciano. For the Palazzo Pitti, legend has it he "decided to employ the most brilliant architect of the times, whom he ordered to make the windows as big as the doors of the Medici residence and create an internal courtyard that was large enough to contain the whole of the Medici's palace on the Via Larga". This is almost certainly apocryphal as the architect Brunelleschi often credited with the design had been dead since twelve years. The true architect, often thought to be Luca Fancelli, was less well known at the time and the new palazzo, while awe inspiring, was not a true rival to the magnificence of the Medici residences. Machiavelli also states that Pitti would give sanctuary to any criminal within his walls if they could be of use in their building or decoration. Machiavelli also hints that Pitti's wealth was further increased by bribes and presents in return for favours. These allegations may or may not be true, one should remember that Machiavelli was not only opposed to the Medici himself, but also a kinsman of Pitti's arch enemy Girolamo Machiavelli who had been most likely murdered by the government which in effect Pitti controlled.

It has been said that Pitti wished to become first citizen and dictator himself. After the death of Cosimo in 1464, he conspired to overthrow and murder Piero di Cosimo de' Medici. He was pardoned by Piero after the failure of the plot and thereafter supported him.

Pitti’s prosperity began to decline after the death of his patron, Cosimo de' Medici, in 1464. Pitti himself died in 1472, and construction on his grand palazzo had already halted in 1465, leaving him unable to see its completion. Despite facing turmoil following the overthrow of the Medici’s power in 1494 and the strict rule of Girolamo Savonarola, the Pitti family managed to retain some influence and continued residing at Palazzo Pitti. However, by 1549, financial struggles forced Buonaccorso Pitti to sell the palace to Eleanor of Toledo, Duchess of Florence, the wife of Cosimo I de' Medici, Duke of Florence. Cosimo later solidified Medici power in Florence in 1537, restoring and strengthening their rule.
