= Franceschi Park =

Park in Santa Barbara, California, United States

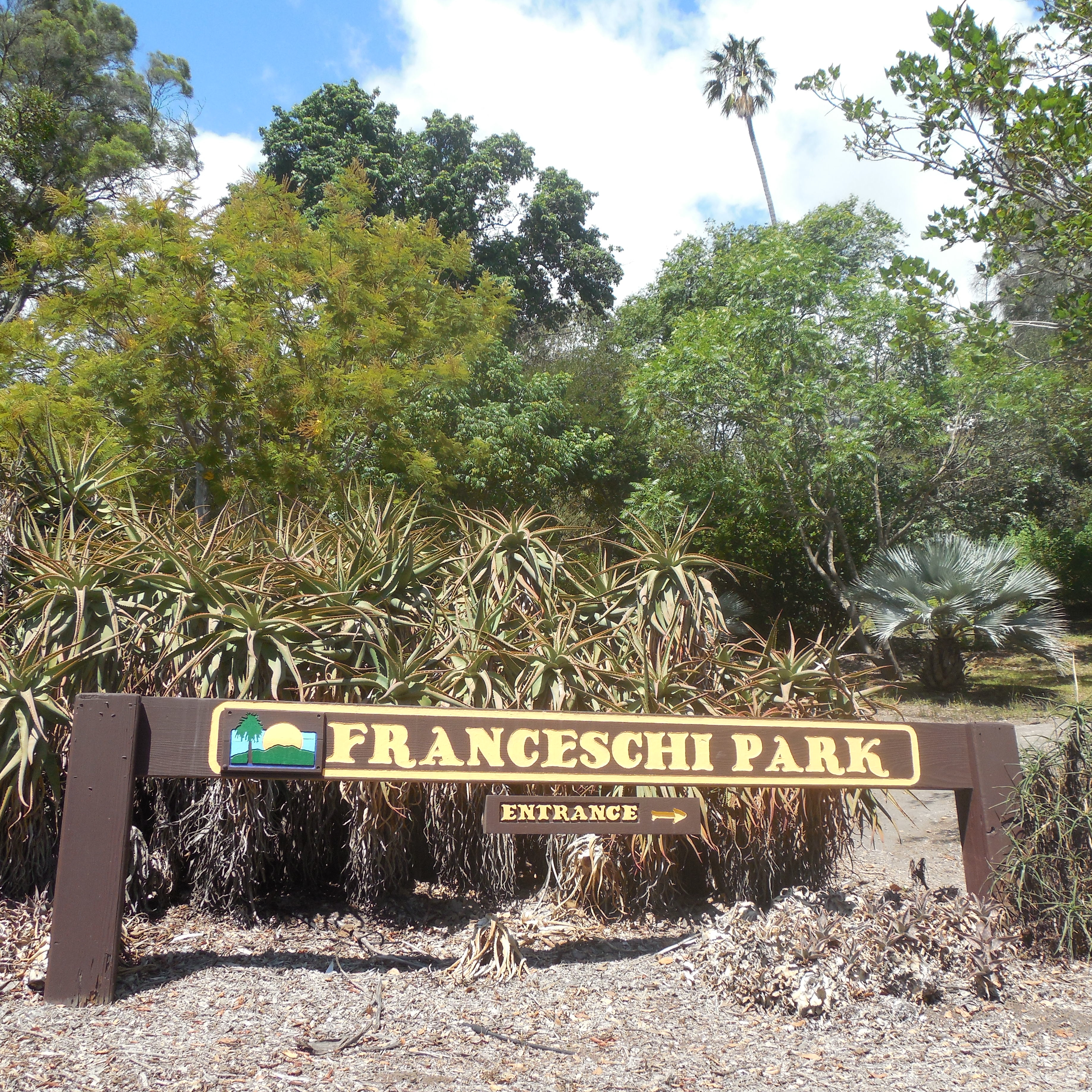
- Franceschi Park in Santa Barbara
- Interactive map of Franceschi Park
- Location: 1510 Mission Ridge Road in Santa Barbara, California, US
- Coordinates: 34°26′24″N 119°41′44″W
- Area: 15.78-acre (6.39 ha)
- Created: Major portion June 1931; small additions 1962, 1964, and 1976
- Operator: City of Santa Barbara Parks & Recreation Department
- Website: Franceschi Park

Franceschi Park is a 15.78-acre public park (6.39 ha) located at the intersection of Mission Ridge Road and Franceschi Road within the Riviera neighborhood of Santa Barbara, California, United States. It is situated at an approximate elevation of 800 ft (240 m) above sea level, some 2 mi (3.2 km) from the coast. Mission Ridge Road divides the park into the northerly 10.94-acre (4.43 ha) upper park, and the southerly 4.84-acre (1.96 ha) lower park. Endowed with an elevated southerly orientation, the upper park offers visitors a clear panoramic view of the City of Santa Barbara's coastline and the Channel Islands. The site hosts a small picnic area, a large patio that serves as a group picnic area, restrooms, some trails, and a parking lot. It also serves as a resource for the pioneering horticultural work undertaken by Italian horticulturalist Dr. Francesco Franceschi.

== History ==
The park's namesake, Francesco Franceschi, operated a 40-acre (16 ha) parcel of land on Mission Ridge as a botanical garden and nursery from 1903 when Franceschi's wife Christina purchased the property, until 1913 when he and his wife returned to Italy. During the time of its purchase, the property was barren and bestrewn with sandstone boulders. Nevertheless, the location was considered ideal for the purpose of establishing a botanical garden, as it straddled both the northern and southern slope of Mission Ridge (offering a variation of solar exposure), and was endowed with soil described by Dr. Franceschi to be "as a whole exceptionally rich, retaining moisture in a wonderful degree on account of the powerful deposit of diatomaceous earth which underlies the disintegrated sandstone."

Since the official creation of the park in 1931, there have been a number of boundary adjustments to the property, including a 3,740-square-foot (347 m^{2}) piece of land on Mission Ridge Road that was donated by a developer as an addition to the lower park in 1976; thus to remedy complaints regarding two houses constructed on the eastern portion blocking the vista from the turnout.

=== Montarioso mansion ===
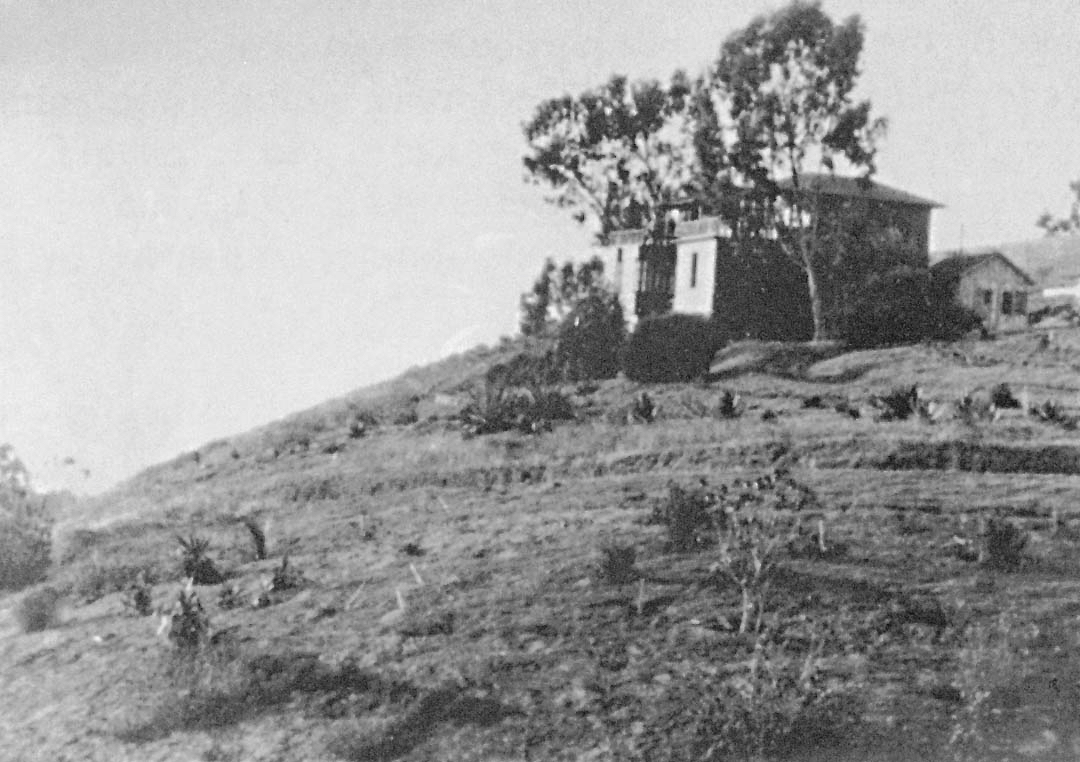
The Montariso mansion in 1907 (the side profile of Mission Ridge Road and Dr. Franceschi's plantings are visible just below the structure).

In 1905, a redwood Craftsman's style mansion was constructed on the site that Dr. Franceschi named "Montarioso" (translated as "airy mountain"), which was enlarged two years later. Franceschi's son, Cammillo started selling portions of the Montarioso property in 1910, then moved into the mansion from his cottage that was located on the property around 1916, where he continued the operation of the nursery until 1918.

In 1927, after learning of the house during a garden tour that was suggested by Pearl Chase, the remaining 2.14 acres (0.87 ha) of the property including the mansion was sold to Alden Freeman, a wealthy Standard Oil heir, progressive reformer, philanthropist, and amateur architect. An admirer of Dr. Franceschi, Freeman undertook creating a park to memorialize him, buying back the property's original acreage that had been sold, and acquiring additional acreage south of Mission Ridge Road that had not been part of the original parcel. This area was intended to serve as additional open space on the hillside, which featured trails that would continue southward to Milpas Street. The mansion was also remodeled into a 5,800-square-foot (540 m^{2}) four-story stucco Mediterranean-style building in homage to Dr Franceschi's cultural origins. Hardscape improvements included: the addition of terraces, axial staircases, and concrete balustrades; the enlargement and conversion of the original vehicle turnaround of the driveway into a terrace featuring a fountain within the center; and the addition of a concrete walkway leading to a semi-circular stone bench on the western side of the house. The original Franceschi era stairways and stone walls within the garden were kept in place.

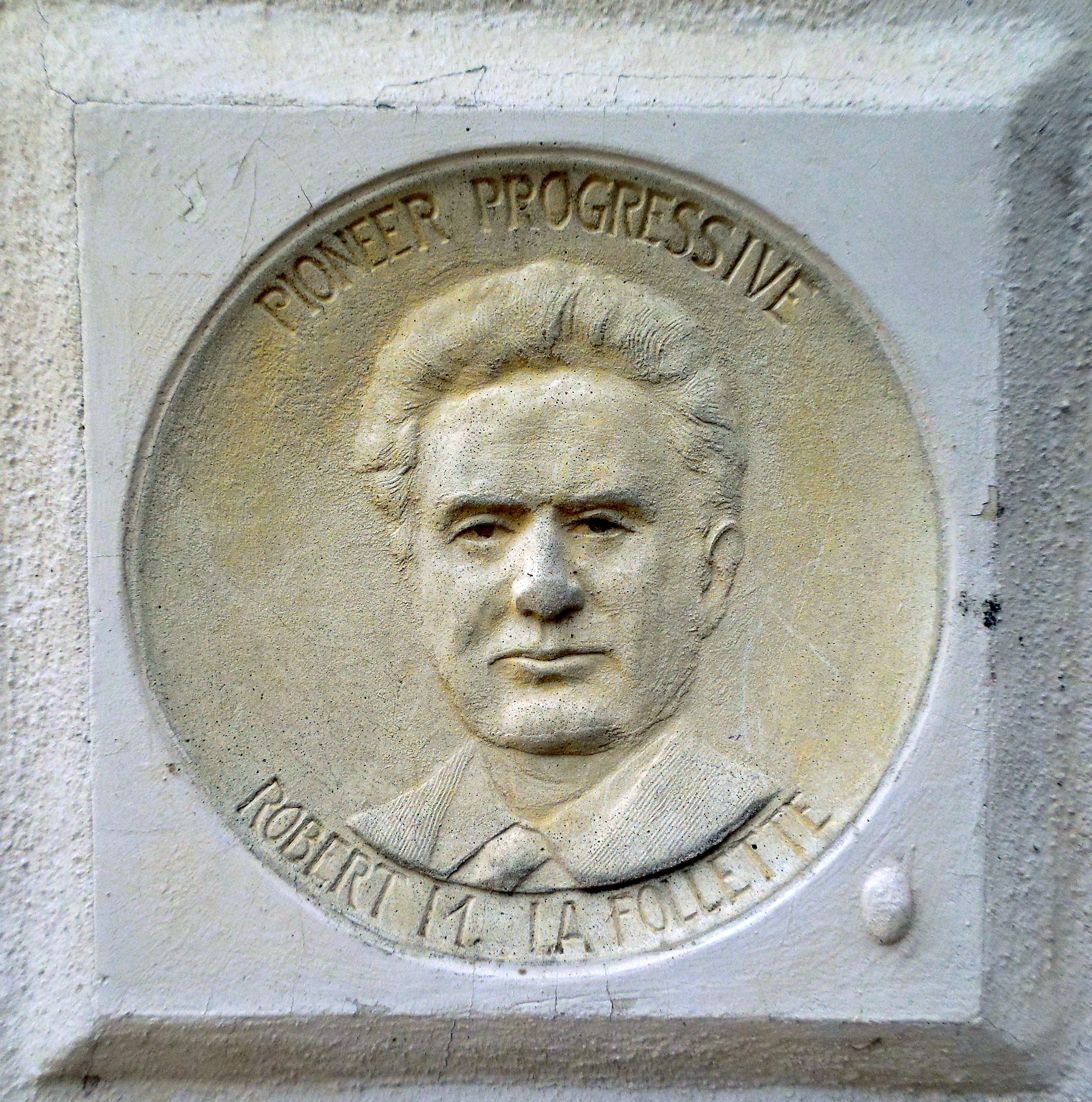
Image of Robert M. La Follette; one of the numerous plaster memorial medallions adorned upon the 1927 Freeman-era Montarioso Mansion.

The exterior walls of the mansion were adorned with eighty-five medallions and plaques commemorating Dr. Franceschi, various historical events (fifteen of which are related to the American Revolution), and progressive luminaries. A duplicate (and today, a more well-preserved) set of the medallions were installed upon another house Freeman had constructed in 1931 that was named Casa Casuarina, otherwise known in more contemporary times as the Versace Mansion within the Miami Beach historic Art Deco district. After Gianni Versace purchased Casa Casuarina in 1992, he restored its medallions to their original condition.

In 1929, Freeman offered the property, including Montarioso, its rare plant collection, and some additional land just south of Mission Ridge Road to the City to serve as a park. As the City was apprehensive to accept the property for a lack of funding for its maintenance, the Mission Ridge Association then sponsored a provision of $1,500 for two years to cover maintenance expenses. Hence in 1931, the City accepted the offer. Sometime thereafter between 1931-1945, the house served as a headquarters for the California State Guard and was utilized by local city schools for horticultural instruction.

In 1963, the City Building Department condemned the house, where it remained unoccupied until 1971. In 1968, the Santa Barbara Horticultural Society persuaded the City Council to hire a landscape architectural consultant to develop a master plan, which formally concluded a recommendation to demolish the house, as it “had little architectural merit and restoration would probably be impractical and very costly.” Although the City Council approved the master plan in 1971, the demolition was nevertheless opposed by Miss Pearl Chase, who formed the "Franceschi Mansion Restoration Committee". Following restoration efforts, the house continued to serve as an intermittent residence for City parks caretakers until 1993. The Committee's efforts also led the City Council to reverse its course and designate the Montarioso mansion as a "City Structure of Merit" in 1981.

Subsequent approvals to demolish the house have taken place in 1998 and in 2018; although the house remains standing in a semi-dilapidated condition.

in 2001, a public-private partnership between the City and the Pearl Chase Society was formed to restore the park. The City committed $300,000 for restoration efforts, and the Pearl Chase Society $250,000 to rehabilitate the house. However, the project was never implemented due to fiscal shortfalls. An April 9, 2015 letter issued from the Pearl Chase Society board concurred with City staff that the project should be discontinued.

=== Botanical Garden & Nursery ===
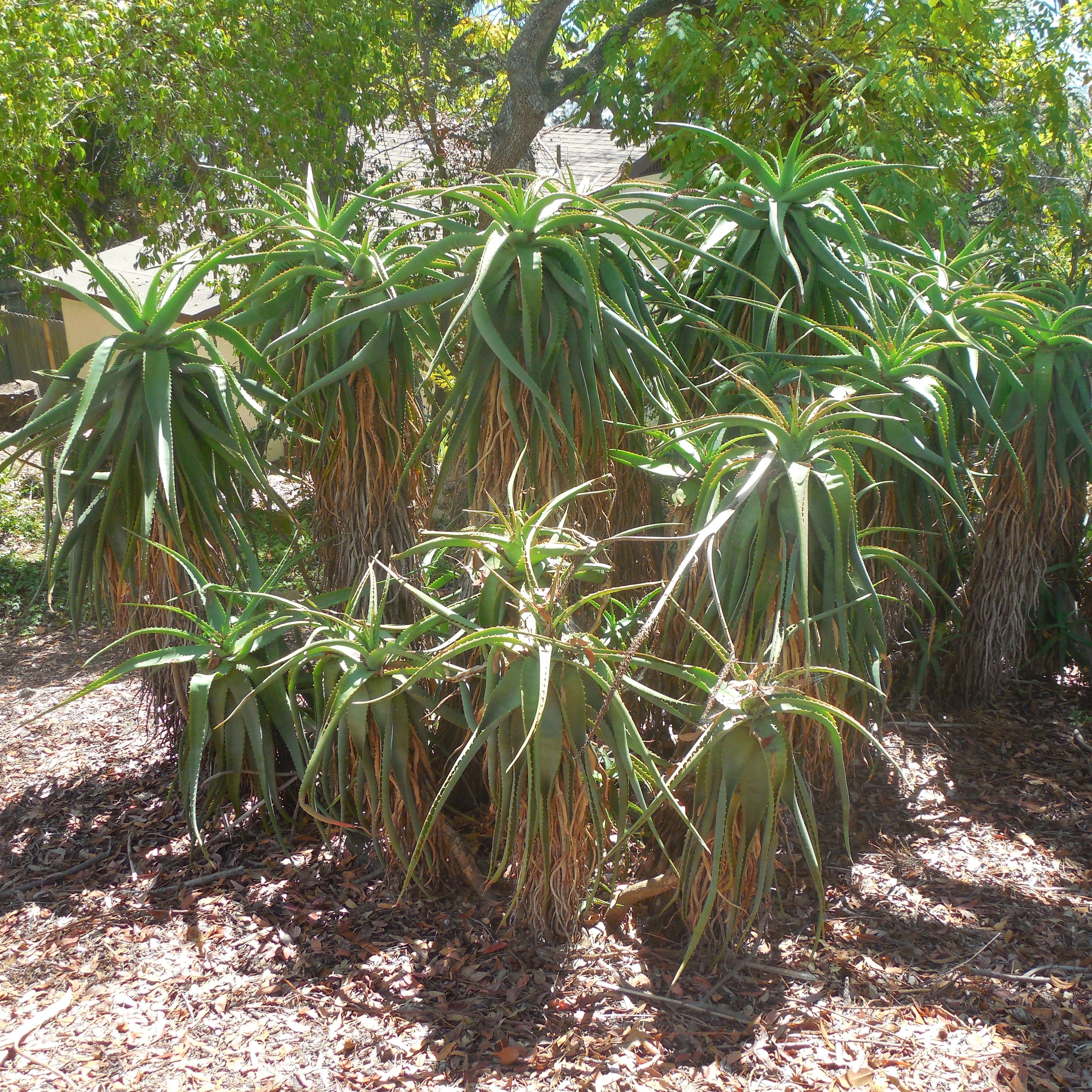
Aloe plantings in back of the Montarioso mansion

Approximately ten of the total forty acres of the property was installed with numerous specimen plants that Dr. Franceschi had located in natural groupings to suit their ideal microclimate, soil quality, topographic elements, and sustainable water demands. Reflective of more contemporary zoned-irrigation systems, Franceschi employed a drought-tolerant planting scheme. The entrance to the garden was marked by two groups of dragon trees (Dracaena draco), an orchard of fruits and nuts was established, and it was arranged with the Santa Barbara Mission that water from the now defunct Mission Park reservoir was pumped into the onsite reservoir. A palm amphitheatre comprising approximately one-hundred species of palms was cultivated on the property from seed germinated within the lath house. The southerly full-sun exposed rocky slope was planted with cactus, aloes, and agaves. Acacias and other Australian flowering shrubbery that did not require irrigation were cultivated together. Partial sun plantings such as camellia, daphne, and rhododendron were cultivated under the shade of the California live oak trees (Quercus agrifolia), along with additional subtropical fruits, olives, palms, bamboo, and other vegetation in an attempt to yield flowering on the property year-round. Lippia (Phyla nodiflora) was cultivated on the property to serve as an arid ground cover plant. First introduced to southern California by Dr. Franceschi in 1899 from specimens obtained from the Botanical Garden of Rome, the subsequently adapted lippia became popular within a dozen years throughout California and Arizona as a preeminent substitute for traditional grassy lawns, as it could thrive in virtually any quality of soil; required a tenth of the water as that of any other kind of lawn; could withstand temperature extremes; rapidly established itself even upon sloping topography whilst smothering out weeds; did not require mowing; and was not difficult to remove itself, because it had no underground runners.

In 1908, Dr. Augustus Boyd Doremus, the City's first superintendent of parks and a personal friend of Dr. Franceschi planted the Italian stone pine trees located along East Anapamu Street (from Milpas Street to Olive Street), which were cultivated from seed at the Montarioso nursery. Although many of the pines have survived, their lifespan has been estimably reduced due to drought and the installation of municipal infrastructure around their root systems, constraining their growth and thereby diminishing their constitution.

By 1909, when Franceschi proposed to the City of Santa Barbara to transform the Montarioso Nursery into "The Santa Barbara Arboretum", there were 135 orders of plants growing onsite. No action was taken by the City on the proposal, purportedly because the civic committee awaited on an arrangement with the United States Department of Agriculture to transpire that never occurred. The nursery's catalogue for that year listed: 13 varieties of palms and cycads; 3 types of bamboo; 24 decorative plants; 29 fruit-bearing and economic plants; 40 evergreen trees; 34 shrubs; 28 climbing and trailing plants; 48 bulbous and perennial plants; and further offered that additional trees, shrubs, and plants not listed were available for order. The following year, the nursery had expanded its listing to include an additional 14 varieties of palms; 5 bamboo; 19 decorative plants; 34 fruit-bearing and economic plants; 68 trees; 144 shrubs; 77 climbers; 45 bulbous and perennial plants; an unstated number of "California Native Plants"; and 20 "New or Rare, First Class Tropical or Semitropical Fruits".

In 1963, Santa Barbara horticulturist Will Beittel conducted the first known survey of the horticultural specimens within the park and observed more than fifty remaining species of plants introduced by Dr. Franceschi were still growing onsite. The City Council approved 1971 master plan observed a need to preserve the botanic and horticultural values of the site.

=== Southern California Acclimatizing Association ===
Dr. Franceschi initiated a plant nursery business, known as the Southern California Acclimatizing Association (SCAA) on lower State Street (on the southwestern corner of Gutierrez Street) and in other locations in Santa Barbara. These functioned as both retail nurseries and horticultural research facilities renown for the cultivation of many practical plants and fruits that were adapted and introduced into the local climate. Originally established in 1893 with Charles Frederick Eaton, the SCAA was first operated out of Eaton’s Rivo Riso estate in Montecito where seed obtained from locations around the world were experimentally cultivated to adapt to the local Mediterranean climate; this being the first such nursery in California to scientifically evaluate new plants for acclimatization. In 1895, the partnership with Eaton ended and Dr. Franceschi relocated the SCAA to downtown Santa Barbara.

Purportedly under financial constraints, the SCAA was incorporated in 1907 when Dr. Franceschi entered into an ill-fated partnership with Peter Riedel, a horticulturist and landscape architect from Holland who owned two nurseries in Montecito. During this time they contracted design-build projects on a number of Santa Barbara estates, where large teams of workers would execute their plans that included planting their unique stock. In 1909, the partnership ended under lawsuits where Riedel won legal ownership of the SCAA business as well as its downtown location. Dr. Franceschi subsequently operated out of his Montarioso Nursery, assisted by his daughter Ernestina Franceschi, also considered to be a talented horticulturist and who became the proprietor; and his son Cammillo who became the manager. Dr. Franceschi later accepted a job working for the Italian government and moved back to Italy in 1913 (where he and his wife resumed the use of their surname "Fenzi"), and hence moved to Tripoli, Libya in 1915. Ernestina subsequently left Santa Barbara in 1916 to rejoin her parents.

== Park Maintenance ==
Situated within the "Foothill Zone" of the City's designated "High Fire Hazard Area", concerns had been raised over time by the surrounding residents and municipal fire staff with regard to the fire danger that the vacant house potentially poses to the neighborhood. Based upon the clearing requirements of the Fire Department, a vegetation management program was implemented to prevent potential fire hazards, via extensive pruning, weed whipping, and cleanup efforts within the upper and lower park during January 2004, and in the following month when the California Conservation Corps cutdown a large stand of Euphorbia (that were considered to be invasive weeds), then located to the west of the parking lot.

A master plan for the park was undertaken at the behest of the Santa Barbara City Council in 1998 and was completed in 2003. Adopted by the City Council in 2004, the recommendations contained within the Franceschi Park Master Plan were the genesis of specific improvements made to enhance visitor experience of the park and preserve its historical value. Completed in 2007, the "first step" improvements included the reconstruction of the entry driveway, two paths, and the parking lot; including its drainage improvements, funded by a $450,000 State Park Grant.

The undeveloped lower park is traversed by several earthen trails with access from three locations: a northerly stone stairway on Mission Ridge Road, the southerly "Mission Steps" on Dover Road, and from an easement at the terminus of Mira Vista Avenue to the west. Originally deeded to the City in 1931 by Alden Freeman, the 30-foot (9.1 m) wide public easement has been illegally impeded or fashioned to appear as a private driveway by neighborhood homeowners, intermittently since 1950.

== Gallery ==
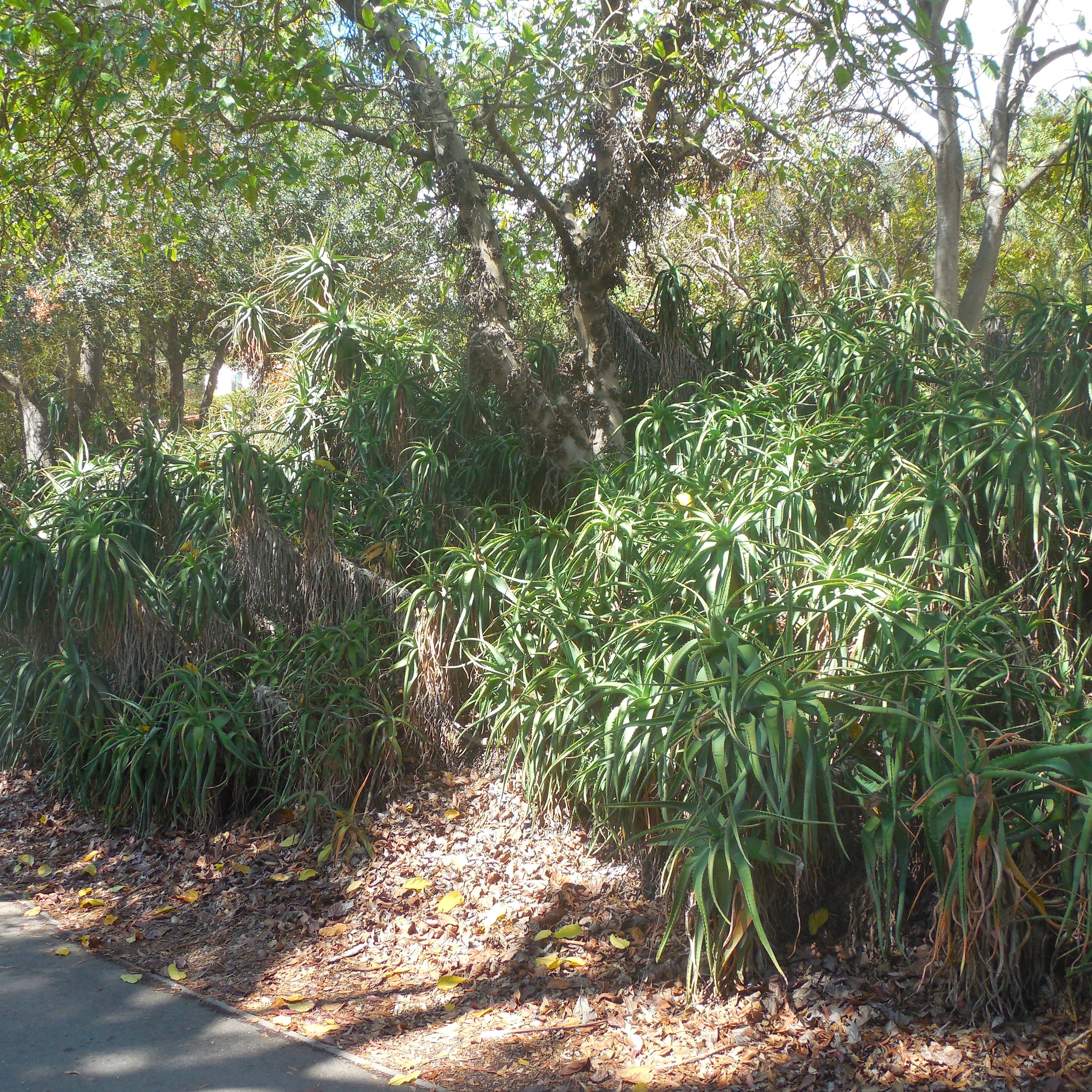
Climbing Aloe plantings along the upper park's access road.

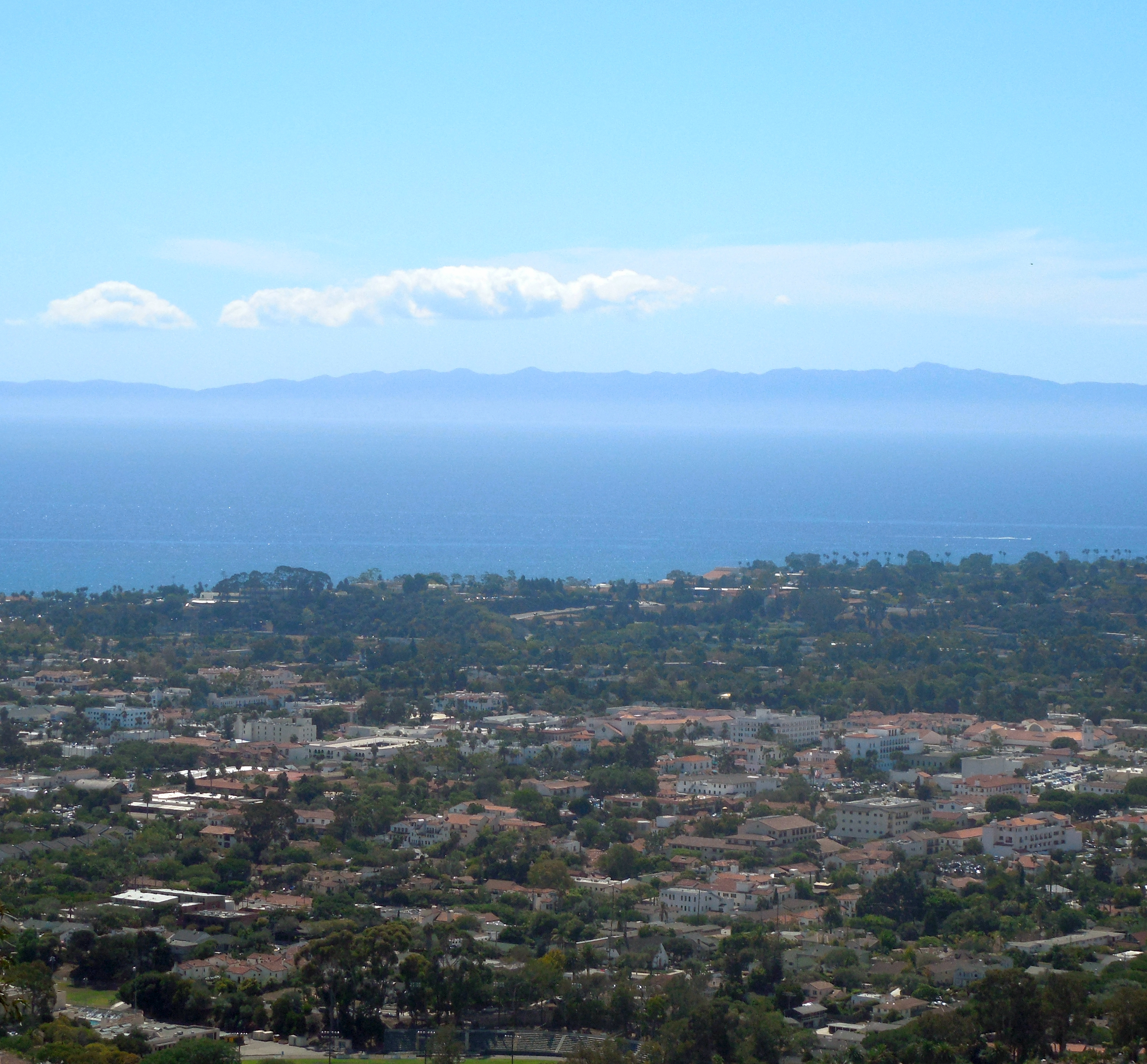
View of downtown Santa Barbara & Channel Islands from Franceschi Park.

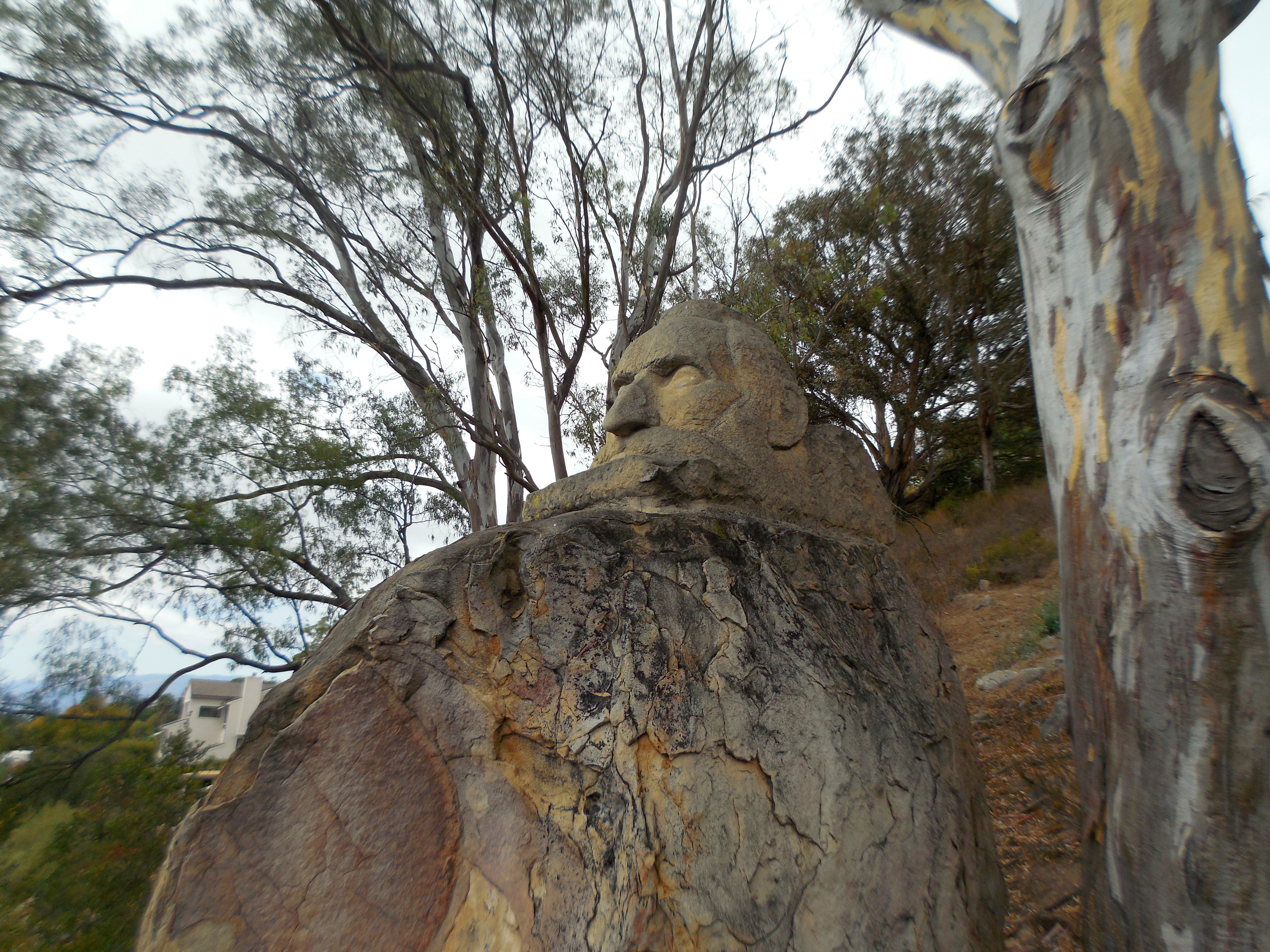
Bust of Dr. Franceschi on the property, carved by Herbert Bengen., but is also attributed to Vuk Vichinich.

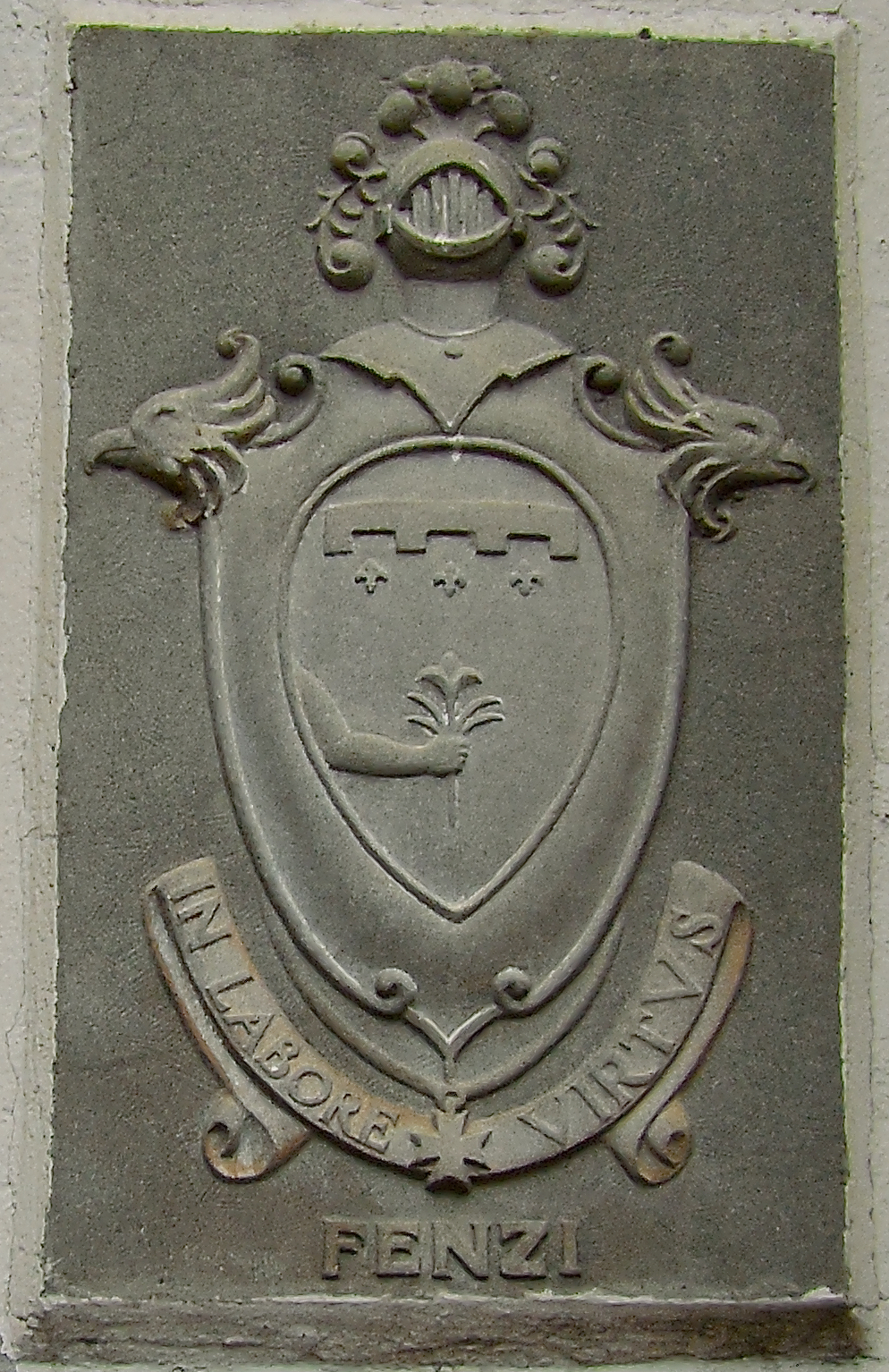
Medallion of the Fenzi family crest installed upon the "Montarioso Mansion"
