= Gherardo Silvani =

Italian architect and sculptor

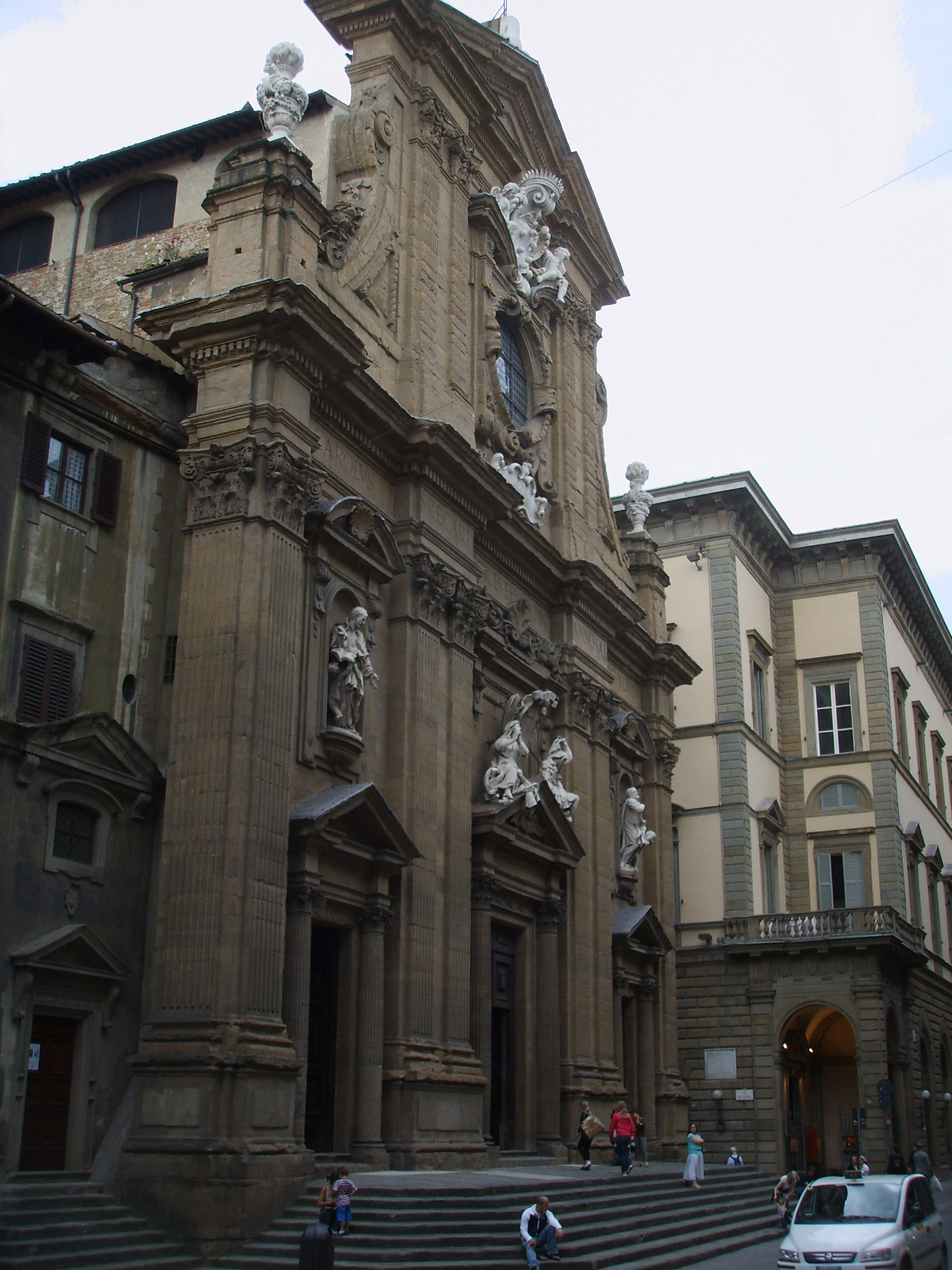
Façade of San Gaetano, Florence

Gherardo Silvani (14 December 1579 – 23 November 1675) was an Italian architect and sculptor, active mainly in Florence and other sites in Tuscany during the Baroque period.

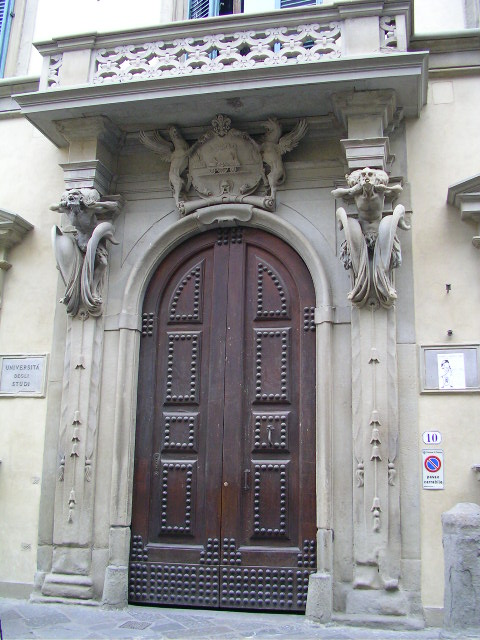
The portal of Palazzo Fenzi

== Biography ==
His son Pierfrancesco also became an architect. He worked on the Palazzo Corsini al Prato, Palazzo Capponi-Covoni (1623), Palazzo Fenzi (1634), Palazzo Pallavicini, Palazzo di San Clemente. He also helped design and construct the altar of the Basilica di Santo Spirito. He helped in the reconstruction of the churches of San Frediano, Santi Simone e Giuda, Sant'Agostino, and the Chiesa di Santa Maria Maggiore (Florence), among others. He helped design the façade of the Basilica of Santa Maria at Impruneta. His model for the façade of the cathedral of Florence was not adopted.

His masterpiece remains the church and facade of San Gaetano (built 1604–1648) in front of Piazza Antinori in Florence. The work was commissioned by the Cardinal Carlo de Medici, and dedicated to the founder of the Theatine order. The building work was shared with Matteo Nigetti. The church is also known as the Church of San Michele and San Gaetano, because it was built on the site of a Romanesque church of San Michele Bertelde. The façade with its sculptural decorations is highly atypical for Florentine churches, which had a predilection for iconoclastic geometrically ornamented façades.
