= Ida Copeland =

British politician and philanthropist (1881–1964)

Ida Copeland FRSA
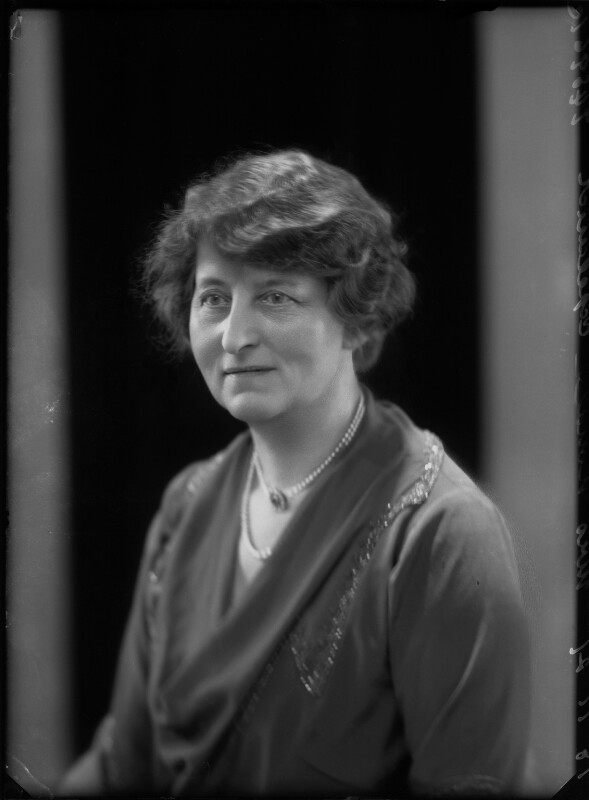
- Copeland in 1921

Member of Parliament for Stoke-on-Trent, Stoke division
- In office 27 October 1931 – 13 November 1935
- Prime Minister: Stanley Baldwin
- Preceded by: Cynthia Mosley
- Succeeded by: Ellis Smith
- Majority: 6,654 votes

Personal details
- Born: Ida Fenzi; 15 April 1881 Florence, Tuscany, Kingdom of Italy
- Died: 29 June 1964 (aged 89) Battle, Sussex, England
- Party: Conservative
- Spouse: Richard Ronald John Copeland
- Occupation: Envoy, politician

Ida Copeland FRSA (née Fenzi; 15 April 1881 – 29 June 1964) was an Anglo-Italian British politician. She was active in social welfare both locally and nationally, particularly the Girl Guides, and was one of the earliest women to enter Parliament, sitting as Conservative MP for Stoke from 1931 to 1935.

== Family and early life ==
Ida was born in Florence, Tuscany, the daughter of Italian Cavalier Camillo Fenzi (1852–1883), and his English wife, Evelyne Isabella, daughter of Sir Douglas Strutt Galton and Marianne (née Nicholson), a first cousin of Florence Nightingale, who were married in 1875. Ida was the great-granddaughter of Cavalier Emanuele Fenzi, Senator of the Grand Duchy of Tuscany and banker (Banco Fenzi), granddaughter of Cavalier Sebastiano Fenzi and his wife, Emily Verity.

On the death of her father, she and her brother Leone inherited the Villa di Rusciano designed by Brunelleschi for the Dukes of Urbino. Copeland grew up in Italy and moved to England at the end of the 19th century. In 1898, her mother married Leonard Daneham Cunliffe, an influential London financier, brother of Walter Cunliffe Governor of the Bank of England, President of the Hudson's Bay Company and one of the major investors in the Harrods department stores.

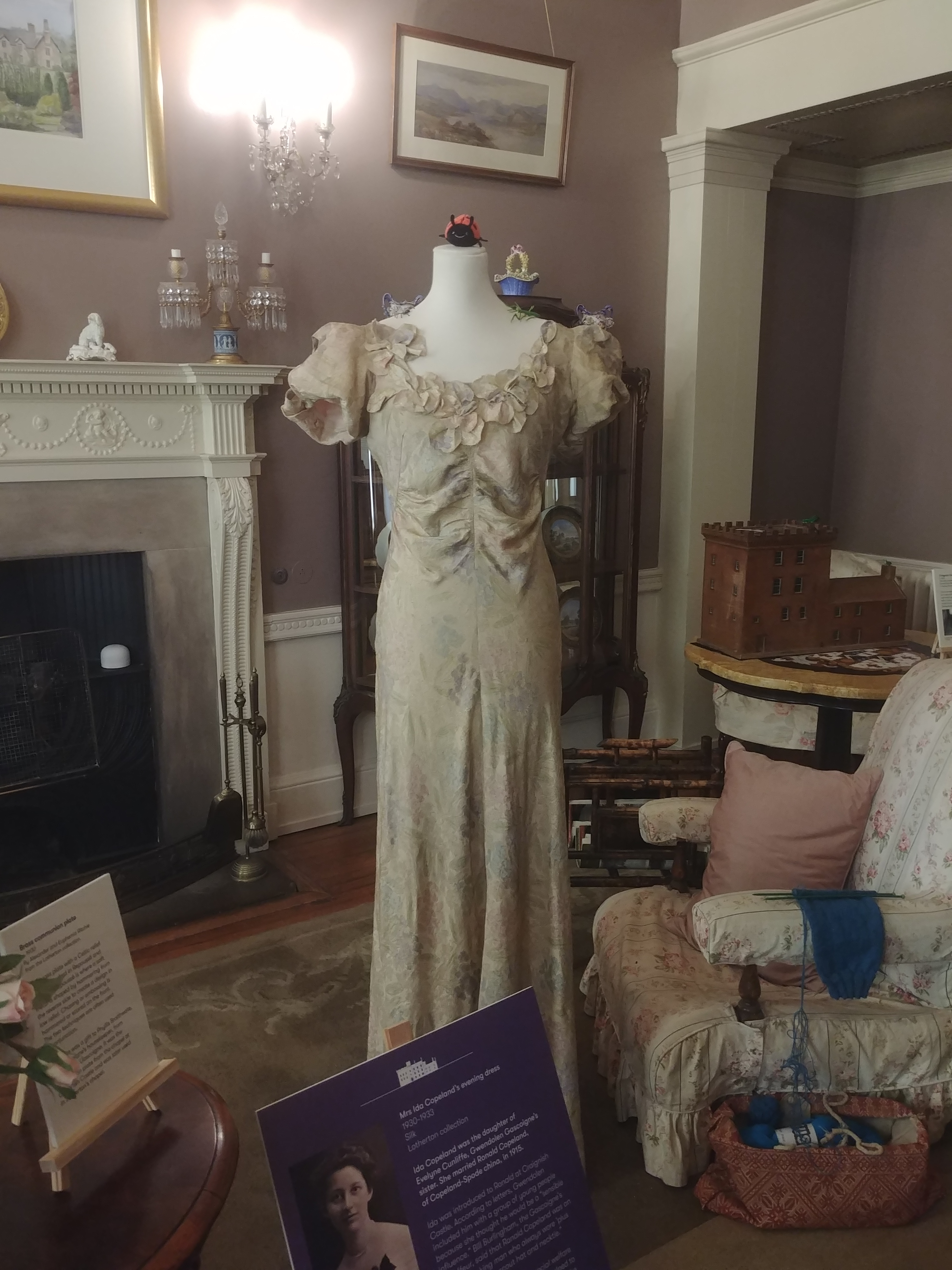
Silk dress belonging to Ida Copeland on display at Lotherton Hall, Leeds

On 28 July 1915, Ida Fenzi wed Ronald Copeland (1884–1958) of Staffordshire, grandson of William Taylor Copeland, Lord Mayor of London, president and chairman of the Spode-Copeland firm of bone china manufacturers in Staffordshire, potters to the royal family since 1806.

== Girl Guides ==
Copeland was an active participant in the success of the Girl Guides, and was a member of the International Council of Girl Guides from 1920 to 1928 and from 1940 to 1948. Throughout her life she was dedicated to all forms of social and welfare causes. Funding and campaigning alongside Baden-Powell for the development of the Girl Guide movement, she served as a division commissioner for the north-west of the county from 1918. Her husband Ronald was a county commissioner for the Boy Scout Association. Later the Copeland family donated the Kibblestone Hall Estate to the Staffordshire Scouting Movement to be used as a Scout camp.

== Elected as MP ==
Elected chairman of the Stoke division of the Women's Unionist Association in 1920, she was chosen as Conservative candidate for the Stoke division of Stoke-on-Trent in 1931 for the general election. Copeland faced Sir Oswald Mosley – leader of the New Party – amongst the opposing candidates, but her popularity and involvement in local politics and welfare proved fruitful. Mosley maintained strong connections with the Nazi Party in Germany. His wife Lady Cynthia Mosley had won Stoke for Labour at the 1929 election. Although Mosley spent less than a week campaigning in the constituency, directing his efforts instead at a national campaign, he met enthusiastic support there, especially amongst younger voters. However, the electoral tide ran in Copeland's favour. Her husband's position as a leading china manufacturer in the Potteries, and her "moderate and straightforward appeal", won her an audience even outside factory gates. She won by an impressive majority of 6,654 votes. She was the 25th woman to be elected to the House of Commons.

In May 1932, Copeland made her maiden speech on import duties, which she approached "entirely from the point of view of the pottery industry". It was an industry under threat from foreign competition and she welcomed the protection that tariffs afforded. She believed that overseas manufacturers paid starvation wages to their workers, and it was with a critical eye on the opposition benches that she asked:

"Can we allow goods manufactured under those conditions to come into this country and lower the standard of living of our own people? I say 'no', and I firmly believe that, if we raise these tariffs, the time will come when our industry will be on its feet again."

She made another plea for protection of the china industry in December 1933 after reports that Australian and New Zealand markets were being flooded by cheap Japanese goods, including skilful imitations of British wares: "the competition is so severe that it threatens to sweep the English Potteries right out of those countries". She wanted the British government to compel the Dominion governments, in their own interests as much as in Britain's, to take action to prevent this "dumping". This was, however, a sensitive matter, and the official response was sympathetic without being specific.
After the war, in 1947, she became godmother to Dorothy Crisp's daughter Elizabeth; Crisp was a right-wing English political figure, writer and publisher.

== Ancestry ==
Ancestors of Ida Copeland

16. Cav. Jacobo Orazio Fenzi
8. Cav. Emanuele Fenzi of Palazzo Fenzi, b 1784, d 1875
17. Luisa Bardini, b 1767, d 1849
4. Cav. Sebastiano Fenzi, b 1822, d 1901
18. Count Luigi Lamberti
9. Countess Ernesta Paffetta dei Lamberti, b 1801, d 1869
19. Eleonora Disperati
2. Cav. Camillo Emanuele Arturo Carlo Sebastiano Fenzi of Palazzo Fenzi, b 1852, d 1883
10. Abraham Verity
5. Emily Verity
11. Catherine Jenkins
1. Ida Fenzi, b 1875, d 1964 m Richard Ronald John Copeland Esq
24. Lucy Barclay of Urie
12. John Howard Galton of Hadzor House, b 1794, d 1862
25. Samuel "John" Galton Jr. FRS of Duddeston House, b 1753, d 1832
6. Sir Douglas Strutt Galton KCB FRS, b 1822, d 1899
26. Joseph Strutt Esq. of St Helen's House, Derby, b 1765, d 1844
13. Isabella Strutt, b 1797, d 1877
27. Isabella Archibald Douglas, b 1769, d 1802
3. Lady Evelyne Isabella Strutt Galton, b 1853, d 1938
28. Samuel Nicholson, b 1738
14. George Thomas Nicholson of Waverley Abbey
29. Mary Haydon
7. Lady Marianne Nicholson
30. William Smith M.P., b 1756, d 1835
15. Ann Elisebeth Smith
31. Frances Coape, b 1758, d 1840

== Accomplishments ==
The Ronald and Ida Copeland memorial at Trelissick

- Served on the International Council of Girl Guides from 1920 to 1928 and in 1940.
- Division Commissioner for N.W. Staffordshire Division of Girl Guides from 1918.
- Chairman of Stoke Division Women's Unionist Association, 1920.
- Chairman of the Staffordshire Anglo Polish Society 1943-.
- President of the Staffordshire Allotment Holders Association in 1948-.
- President of the Women's Advisory Council, Truro Division 1955.
- MStJ: Sister of Most Venerable Order of the Hospital of St John of Jerusalem, 1949.
- Polish Gold Cross of Merit, 1952.
- Donor of the Trelissick Gardens Estate to the National Trust in 1955.

Parliament of the United Kingdom
Preceded by Cynthia Mosley	Member of Parliament for Stoke; 1931–1935	Succeeded by Ellis Smith
