= Lothian Nicholson =

Lieutenant-General Sir Lothian Nicholson KCB
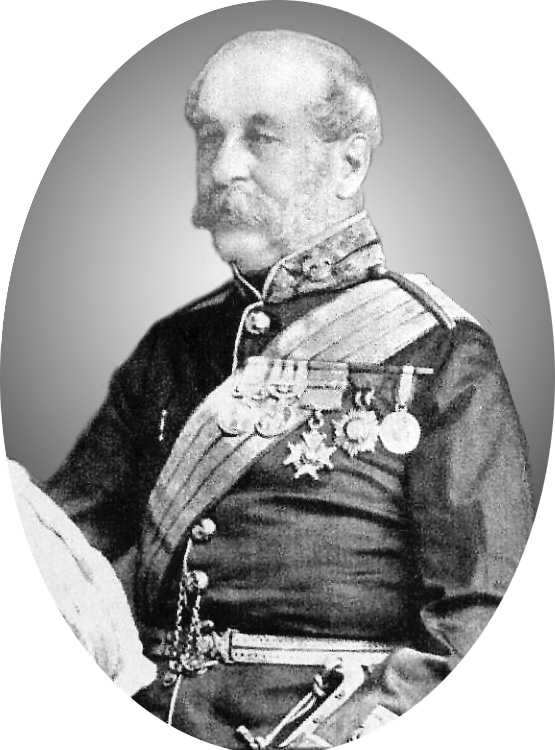
- Born: 19 January 1827
- Died: 27 June 1893 (aged 66)
- Military career
- Allegiance: United Kingdom
- Branch: British Army
- Service years: 1846–1893
- Rank: Lieutenant-General
- Conflicts: Crimean War; Indian Mutiny
- Awards: Knight Commander of the Order of the Bath

Lieutenant-General Sir Lothian Nicholson KCB (19 January 1827 – 27 June 1893) was Governor of Gibraltar.

== History ==
He was the son of George Thomas Nicholson and his wife Anne Elizabeth Smith, daughter of William Smith. Educated at Mr Malleson's School in Hove and at the Royal Military Academy, Woolwich, Nicholson was commissioned into the Royal Corps of Engineers in 1846. In 1855 he was sent to the Crimean War where he took part in the Siege of Sevastopol.

In 1857 Nicholson went to Calcutta to help suppress the Indian Rebellion. He was present at the capture of Lucknow.

He was appointed to command the Royal Engineers in the London District in 1861 and then the Royal Engineers in Gibraltar from 1868. Later that year he became Assistant Adjutant-General for the Royal Engineers in Ireland.

In 1878 he was made Lieutenant Governor of Jersey and in 1886 he was made Inspector-General of Fortifications. In 1891 he became Governor of Gibraltar: he died in office in 1893 and is buried in North Front Cemetery there.

His children included Major-General Sir Cecil Lothian Nicholson, who commanded a division in the First World War, and Admiral Sir Douglas Romilly Lothian Nicholson, who commanded several battle squadrons in the First World War.

Government offices
| Preceded by Sir William Norcott | Lieutenant Governor of Jersey; 1878–1883 | Succeeded by Henry Wray |
| Preceded by Sir Leicester Smyth | Governor of Gibraltar; 1891–1893 | Succeeded by Sir Robert Biddulph |
