= Santi Simone e Giuda, Florence =

Church in Florence, Italy

Coordinates: 43°46′11″N 11°15′38″E

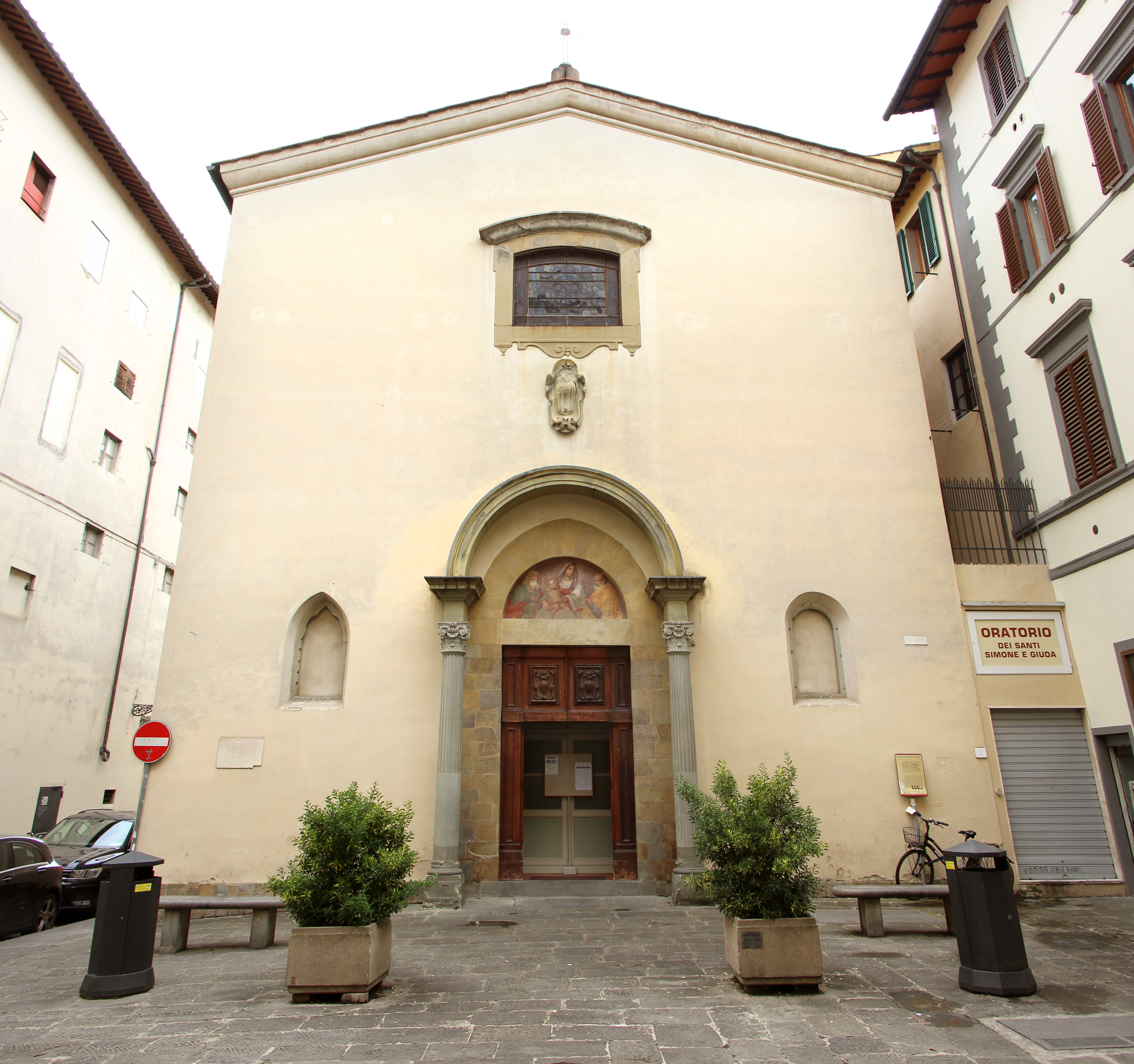
Facade

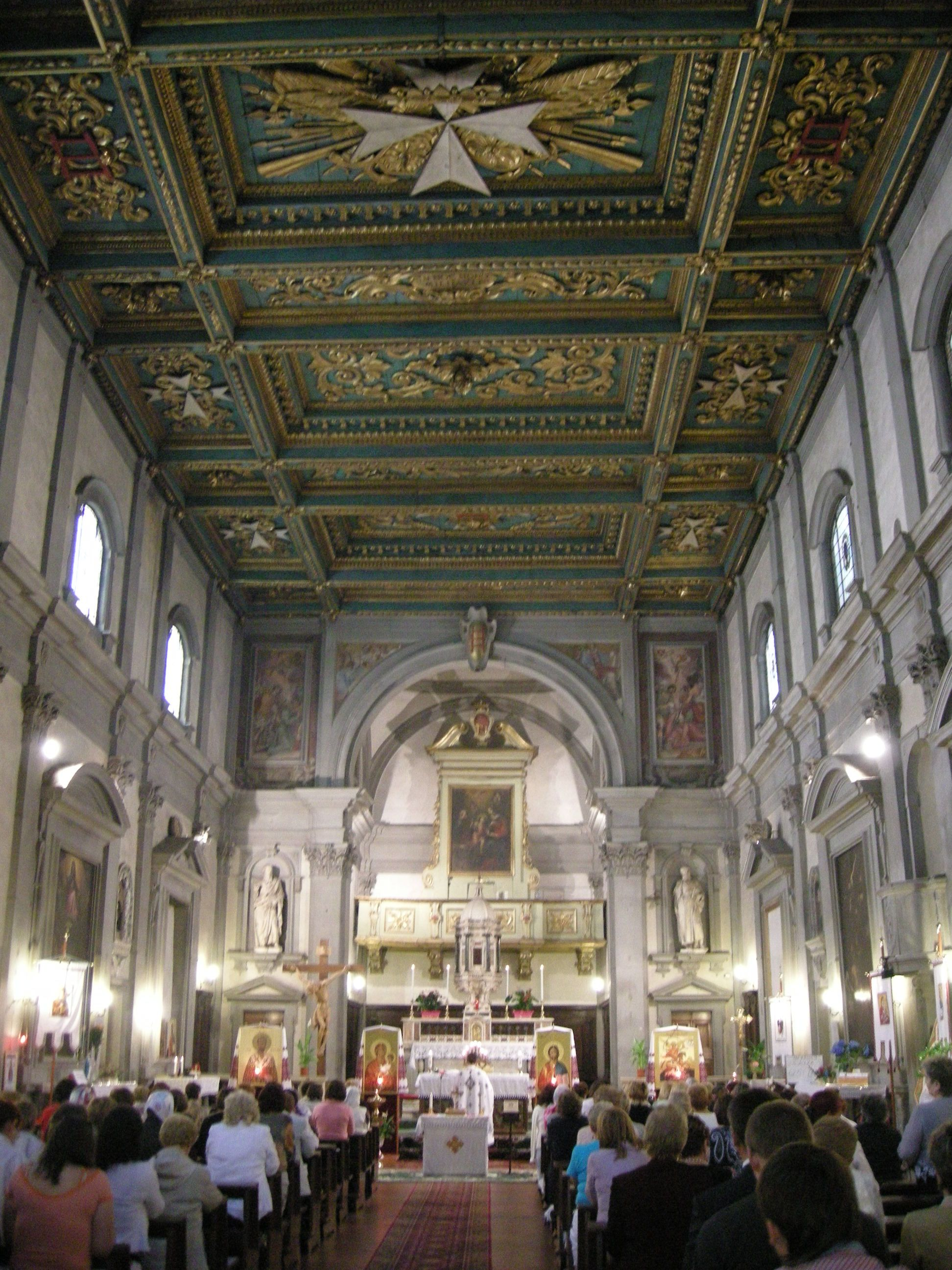
Interior

Santi Simone e Giuda (Saints Simon and Jude) is a church in Florence, situated on the Piazza San Simone in an area of narrow streets between the Piazza Santa Croce and the Piazza della Signoria. The present structure dates from 1243 but underwent a major renovation designed by Gherardo Silvani in 1630. Today it is affiliated with the Ukrainian Greek Catholic Church.

== History ==
The church began its life in 1192 as a small oratory situated outside the city walls in vineyards owned by the monks of the Badia Fiorentina. It was enlarged in 1209 and then completely re-built in 1243. The new building was consecrated in 1247 by Bishop Ardengo Trotti and was designated a parish church. It was badly damaged when the Arno flooded in 1527. Amongst the damage was the loss of the ciborium which had been made of wood and was completely washed away. Serious renovation of the church did not begin until the first quarter of the 17th century when the archbishop of Florence, Alessandro Marzi Medici, elevated its status to a priory and named Giovanni Niccolai as its first prior in 1608, a post he held until his death in 1642. Niccolai came from a wealthy and cultured Tuscan family and initiated the renovation of the church. By 1619 a new high altar made of Carrara marble was added and the choir stalls and presbytery were completely renovated under the patronage of Bartolomeo Galilei, a relative of Galileo. The next stage of the renovation began in 1630. It was designed by Gherardo Silvani and paid for by the nephew of Bartolomeo. Also called Bartoleomeo Galilei, he was a Knight of Malta and steward to Leopoldo de' Medici. The final stage of Silvani's renovation (a richly decorated ceiling) was completed in 1665. The church contains numerous emblems of both the Galilei family and the Knights of Malta.

== Burials ==
Notable Florentines buried in the church include

- Raffaellino del Garbo (ca. 1466–1524), painter
- Andrea Salvadori (1591–1634), poet and librettist
