= Emanuele Fenzi =

Italian politician

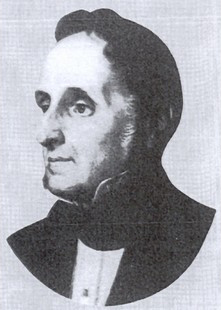
- Emanuele Fenzi
- Born: April 8, 1784; Florence, Italy
- Died: January 10, 1875 (aged 90); Florence, Italy
- Citizenship: Italian
- Era: Pre- and post-Italian Unification: 18th century
- Known for: Merchant banking, iron producer
- Spouse: Countess Ernesta Paffetta dei Lamberti (1801–1869)

Emanuele Fenzi (8 April 1784 – 10 January 1875) was a leading Italian banker, iron producer, concessionaire of the Florence–Livorno railway and other railway enterprises, merchant for exportation of Tuscan products, and landowner. Made Senator of the Grand Duchy of Tuscany and later of the Kingdom of Italy, Knight of the Sacred Military Order of Saint Stephen, Pope and Martyr, and Knight of the Order of Saint Joseph. He lived in Palazzo di Via San Gallo, Villa Rusciano Villa Fenzi at Sant'Andrea in Percussina, and at a house in the city of Livorno.

== Career ==
Fenzi was nineteen when his father, judge and jurist Cav. Jacopo Orazio Fenzi (1745–1803), died. Upon the loss of his father, he began to provide for the family. Having already proved himself a worthy entrepreneur under his fathers guidance, Count Fenzi acquired in 1805 the management of Bosi, Mazzarelli & Co., his entrepreneurial sense was rewarded by the economic success of the company.

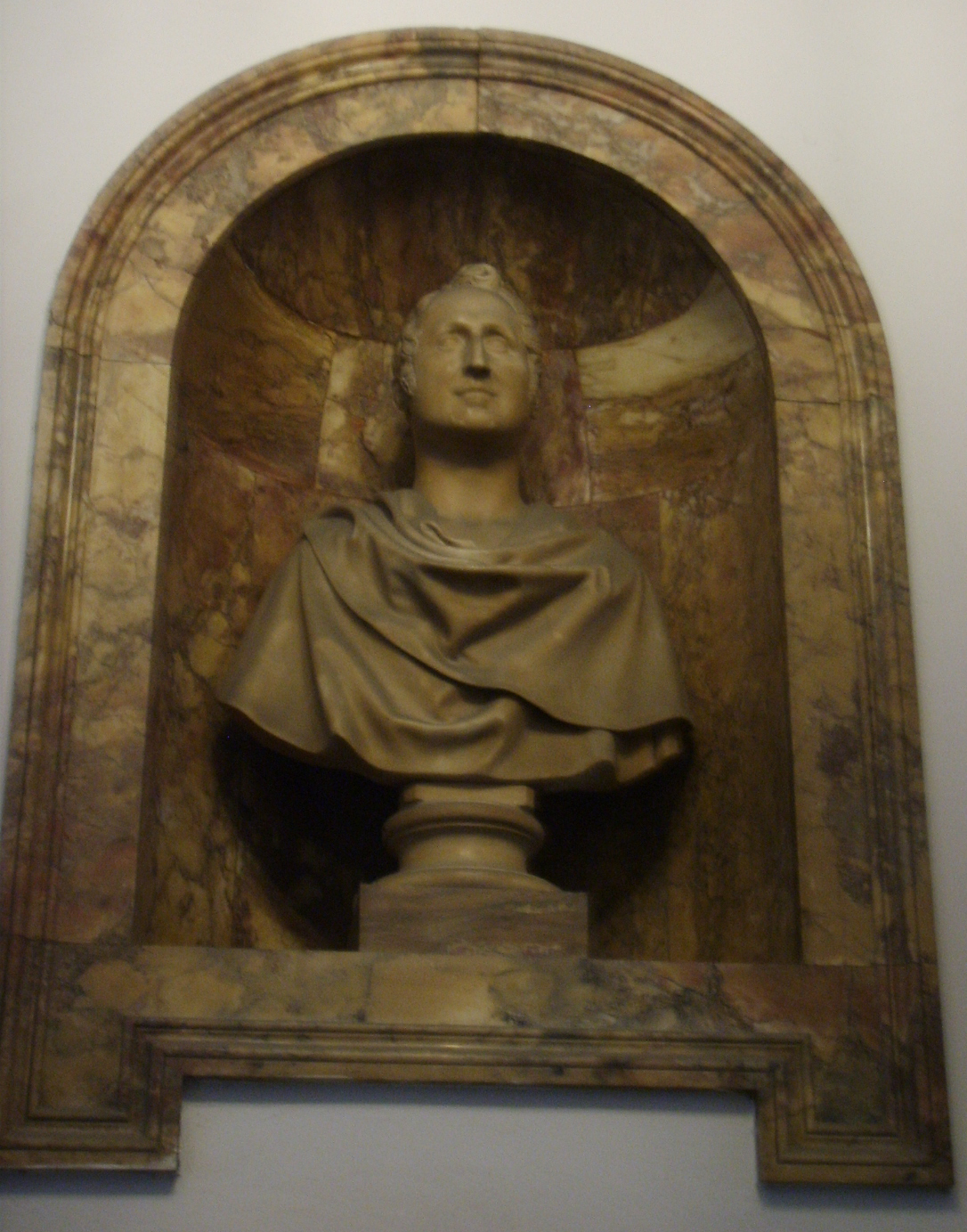
Bust of Emanuele Fenzi in Palazzo Fenzi by Lorenzo Bartolini

In 1810, he bought a building on Corso dei Tintori and married the daughter of a Milanese aristocrat and merchant Countess Ernesta Paffetta dei Lamberti; they had four children. The same year with some fellow members of Bosi, Mazzarelli & Co he founded Bosi, Mazzarelli & Co., specializing in the manufacture and sale of tobacco and gained the monopole of the tobacco industry within the Grand Duchy of Tuscany between 1814 and 1820.

By 1821, Fenzi established the Banca Fenzi, which was soon to branch out all over Italy and Europe. He opened a branch in Piazza della Signoria and from 1829 it acquired a Palazzo on Via San Gallo that was to become the Palazzo Fenzi, that had been put up for sale after the extinction of the Marucelli family.

The Livorno banking house of Senn joined with the Florentine firm of Fenzi to secure the concession for the Strada Ferrata Leopolda, designed to link Leghorn with Florence by way of Empoli, and the line was begun in 1841, to be finished ultimately in June 1848. By 1845 the desire for a network of railways had led, according to one estimate, to sixteen projects which lay on the grand duke's desk for consideration.

Fenzi was also an investor in the Tuscan steel industry and had owned the Gavorrano mine, the Mammiano ironworks on the Pistoia Apennines, and was a shareholder of the "Società per l'Industria del Ferro".

In 1835 Fenzi seized the opportunity to finance the planned construction of the railway line between Florence and the port of Livorno, the Leopold railway, with the contractor Swiss French Pierre Senn of Livorno, hence entering into a contract with the Grand Ducal government in 1838. The railway was one of the first in Italy and was named Leopolda in honour of the Grand Duke Leopold II of Lorraine.

He had a career as a politician as member of the Tuscan Senate between 1848 and 1849 and was among the biggest supporters of the return of the Grand Duke in Tuscany. After the fall of the Grand Duke he became senator of the new Kingdom of Italy in 1860, having sworn loyalty to the new government.

== Family ==
Emanuele Fenzi was the grandfather of horticulturist Emanuele Orazio Fenzi, known in America as Francesco Franceschi (1843–1924). He was also the great-grandfather of Ida Copeland (née Fenzi; 1881–1964), one of the earliest women to be elected to the British Parliament.

== Bibliography ==
=== References to linked inline notes ===
- Fallani, Luigi; Milana, Lucia (1996). "Fenzi, Emanuele". Dizionario Biografico degli Italiani [Biographical Dictionary of Italians] (in Italian). Vol. 46. Rome: Istituto dell'Enciclopedia Italiana. OCLC 1114916606.
- Gabbrielli, Carlo (1875). Cenni Biografici del Senatore Emanuele Fenzi [Biographical notes of Senator Emanuele Fenzi] (in Italian). Florence: Stabilimento Pellas. OCLC 23694689.
- Mori, Giorgio (1966). L'Industria del Ferro in Toscana Dalla Restaurazione Alla Fine del Granducato [The Iron Industry in Tuscany From the Restoration to the End of the Grand Duchy]. Archivo Economico dell'Unificazione Italiana (in Italian). Vol. 13. Turin: Industria Libraria Tipografica Editrice, S.p.A. OCLC 1071237001.
- "'Scheda Senatore' → 'Fenzi, Emanuele'" ['Senator Card' → 'Fenzi, Emanuel']. Senatori d'Italia → Senatori del Regno (1848–1943) [Senators of Italy → Senators of the Kingdom (1848–1943)] (online) (in Italian). Rome: L'Archivio Storico del Senato. 2003 – via Senato.it. The entry for Sen. Fenzi is not dated; but the Historical Archive of the Senate was launched online in 2003.

== See also ==
- Fenzi
- Chianti tramway
