= Joseph Fawcett =

Joseph Fawcett (c. 1758 – 24 January 1804) was an 18th-century English Presbyterian minister and poet.

Fawcett began his education at Reverend French's school in Ware, Hertfordshire and in 1774 entered the dissenting academy at Daventry. At the school, he practiced his preaching on thorn bushes. In 1780 Fawcett was called to be the morning preacher at Marsh Street Presbyterian Chapel in Walthamstow, east of London. His adoption of Unitarianism led to a schism in the congregation and he resigned in 1787. On 23 September 1782, Fawcett married the daughter of his schoolteacher, Charlotte French.

In 1785 he began a series of Sunday evening lectures at the Old Jewry meeting house in the City of London. This series established Fawcett as one of the most popular Dissenting preachers of the time. He supposedly drew "the largest and most genteel London audience that ever assembled in a dissenting place of worship". He appealed to a broad audience, including Anglicans, actors such as Sarah Siddons and the Kembles. William Wordsworth was taken to hear Fawcett by his London friend, Samuel Nicholson. Wordsworth admired his sermons, but felt that Fawcett was unstable, and is said to have modelled the "Solitary" in his poem "The Excursion" after him.

In 1795 Fawcett abandoned his preaching and leased a farm called Edge Grove near Aldenham, Hertfordshire. In the late 1790s he published a series of poems opposing Britain's war with France. These were much lauded; Joseph Priestley wrote that his The Art of War revealed "a most exuberant imagination ... some parts are very affecting".

Fawcett associated with other reformers, such as William Godwin and William Hazlitt. Godwin and Fawcett met in 1778 at Ware and remained friends for their entire lives. Godwin wrote that he was the most important of the "four principal instructors". Hazlitt wrote "with him I passed some of the pleasantest days of my life. The conversation ... of taste and philosophy gave me a delight such as I can never feel again ... he was the person of the most refined and least contracted taste I ever knew".

Unlike many of his time, Fawcett was an open republican.

Fawcett died in 1804 and was buried in Aldenham churchyard.
