= Fenzi =

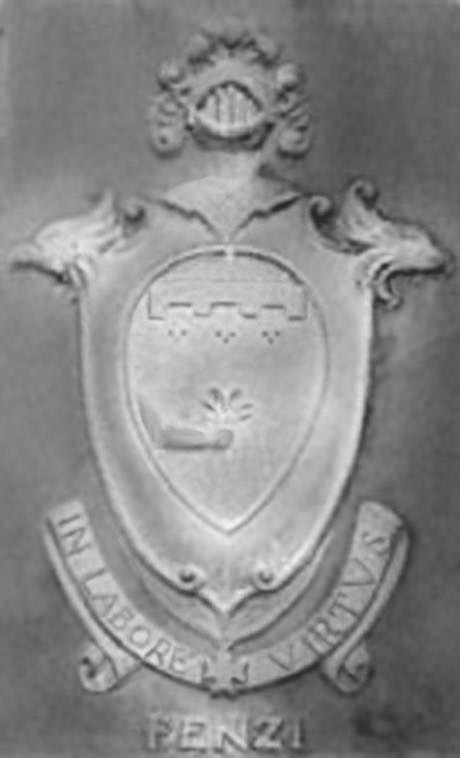
Fenzi Coat of Arms Motto: In Labore Virtus

The Fenzi Bank and family were key players in both the economic growth of the Italian industrial revolution and the expansion of the north Italian Railways between Florence and Livorno in 18th and 19th century Italy.

== The Family ==
The old Florentine aristocratic family produced several generations of noteworthy citizens who enhanced and enabled many different aspects of both the Florentine political life and economic market during the 17th, 18th and 19th century. Although the origins of the Fenzi family can be traced back to the Italian Renaissance, it was not until the mid 17th century that the fortune of the family was to become as substantial as the name Fenzi during the 18th and 19th century. The main founder of the Fenzi dynasty was Francesco Fenzi, who became financial adviser and creditor to the Grand Duke Pietro Leopoldo of Tuscany at the end of the 17th century; from that point onwards the family fortunes were to rise in connection with the financing of both private and public initiatives. The Fenzi family was to benefit from all the notable privileges of the nobility such as tax exemptions granted by the favors of the Grand Duchy of Tuscany.

One of the most successful Fenzis was Cavalier Emanuele Fenzi 1784 - 1875, elder son of Cavalier Jacopo Orazio Fenzi (1745–1805), a Magistrate in the Florentine courts. By 1805 Emanuele had already established himself as a successful entrepreneur working for Bosi, Mazzarelli & C. By 1810 his reputation and talent as an entrepreneur were so well recognized in the trade that he decided to set up his own firm la Bandi, Orsi, Fenzi & C. making and selling tobacco. In this same year he acquired a Palazzo in the centre of Florence, where he set up his headquarters. By 1820 the tobacco industry had grown to such an extent due to Emanuele's entrepreneurial initiatives and the extension of trade in Italy and Europe that by 1821 Emanuele had accumulated enough wealth to establish the Fenzi Bank. By 1829 the Bank was established in what today known as the Fenzi Palace via San Gallo, one of the best addresses in Florence. In 1860 Emanuele Fenzi became Senator. He later built the Palazzo Fenzi on Piazza della Signoria (designed by Giuseppi Martelli), and now the Assicurazioni Generali. Here Emanuele Fenzi raised his grandson, the noted horticulturist Emanuele Orazio Fenzi.

One of the main factors linked to the success of the Fenzi family was the ability with which they managed to expand their ties to not only Italian investors but also the different financial marketplaces in Europe as well as maintaining links with other European aristocracy. They were central players in the financing of the Suez Canal in association with 'Hans Oppenheim and Co' - founders of the 'Society General de l'Empire Ottoman. On May 8, 1867, Eugenia Frederica Ernesta Louisa Maria Fenzi (1849–1910), daughter of Sebastian Fenzi (1822–1901) and Emily Verity (1827–1869), married Gustavus Adolphus Oppenheim (1838–1906). And, for her, the Villa Oppenheim (now Hotel Villa Cora) was built in Florence. Eugenia was the last person to cross on land before the two channels of the Sueze Canal were connected. During the period when Florence was the capital of Italy the Villa Oppenheim was the political and social salon of Italy. Eugenia and Gustavus divorced February 17, 1883, after which, Eugenia lent the villa to the Empress Eugenie who later purchased it. Eugenia, again, married Count Prina Ricotti (1842–1921). Ouida's 1876 novel, In a Winter City, is based on Eugenia prior to her second marriage.

The Fenzis' historic Seat was the Villa de Granatier, but their principal residence was their estate at Sant'Andrea in Percussina, San Casciano (altered by Giuseppe Martelli) and they later acquired the Villa Rusciano designed by Brunallechi for the Dukes of Urbino.

== The Bank ==
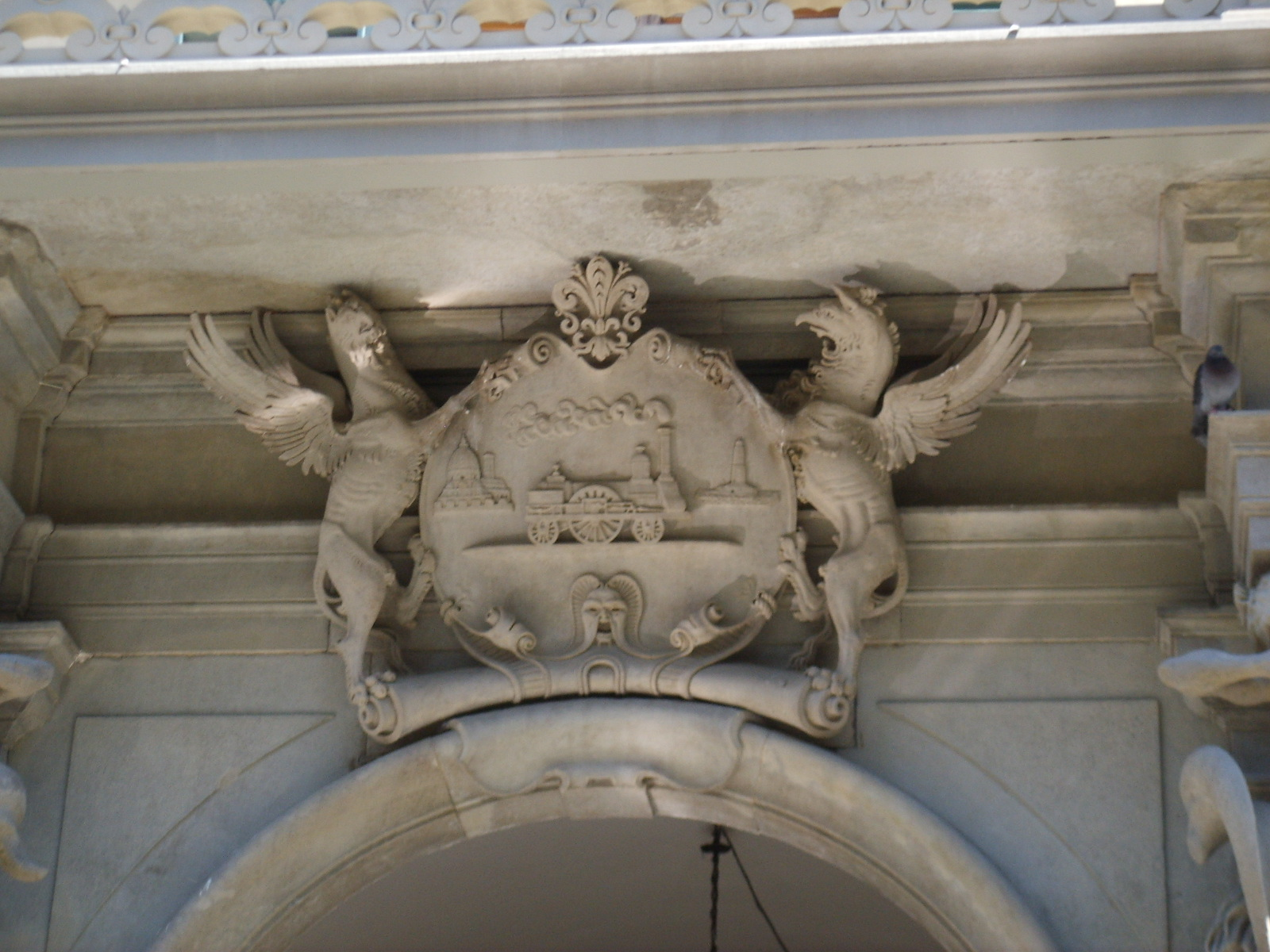
FlorenceCoat of Arms

Established in 1821 by Emanuele Fenzi, the bank, also known as the "Cassa di Sconto", is most famous for being the first public Bank in Italy. Based in the heart of Florence in the Fenzi-Murucelli Palace on Via San Gallo. They later built the Palazzo Fenzi Piazza della Signoria designed by Giuseppi Matelli, now Assicurazioni General. At the beginning of the nineteenth century, the Fenzi family started to create alliances with potential business partners both local and foreign. By the 1820s the Fenzi Bank was backing the Hall family who had acquired the monopoly of the Tuscan straw hat market in England. Whilst maintaining an activity of financing public initiatives, in 1849 they became the main stockholders in the company that built the railway Leopolda. In the next thirty to forty years, the Fenzi Bank spread its network throughout Europe; by 1860, their agents were present in all the most important markets of central and northern Italy and in several cities in England, France, and Germany. They were parties to the financing of the Suez Canal. Through their network of financial activities and their willingness to invest in common financial operations with both Tuscan and international banks, the Fenzi Bank blazed the trail for the creation of large credit institutions and for a unified financial market in Tuscany in the period before the 1860 annexation to the Kingdom of Italy.

== The Railway ==
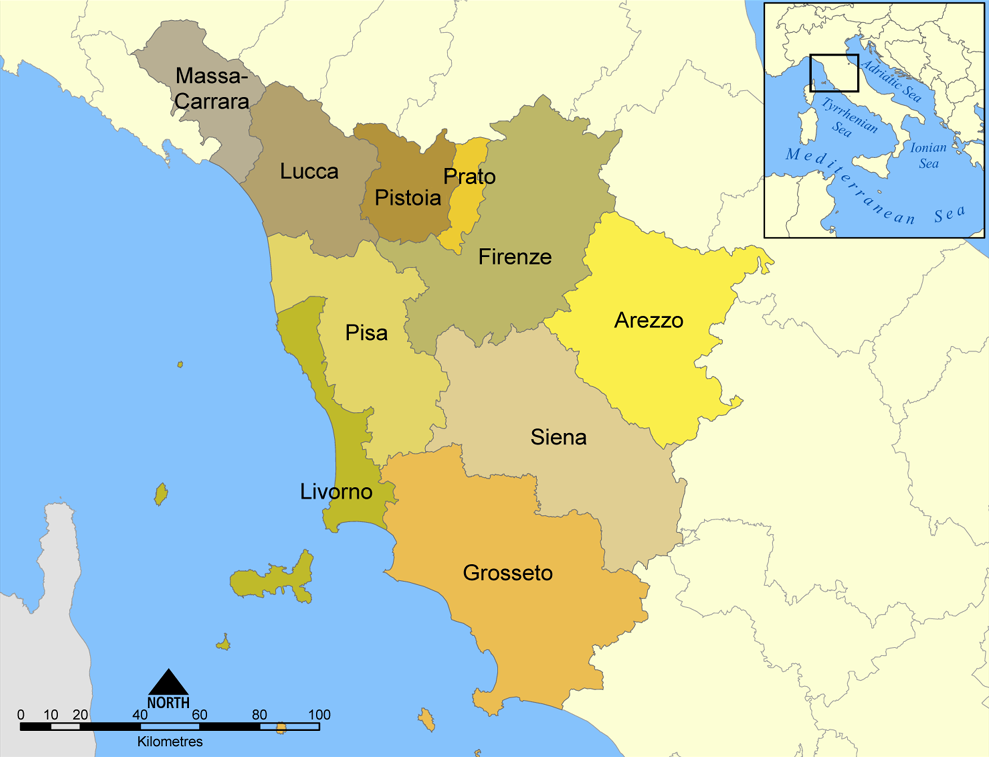
Tuscany

It was in 1826 that marquis Leopoldo Carl Ginori first introduced the government to the iron track. The creation and innovation of the northern railways soon became a project that was dear to all members of the Italian government. When in the early 1830s the Italian government was to sort out a financial partner for the project the Fenzi Bank entered the competition. The final decision was reached in 1835. There was to be the creation of a Railway between Florence and the coastal port of Livorno via Pisa and was to be named Leopolda after the then Grand duke. In 1837 count Luigi Serristori and the engineer Piero Dini Castelli proposed a study for the Railway. However the Fenzi project had been accepted as more serious and bitterly planned. An agreement was set up between the government the Fenzi bank, a local contractor company and British engineer Peter Senn & C. of Livorno disciple of George Stephenson and his son Robert Stephenson. The opening date for the Railway line works was set for the 14 April 1838. The line was eventually inaugurated in 1844. After nearly 20 years of planning and creation upset by the unstable political situation of the Risorgimento, the first section of the Leopolda Railway was at last finished.

== See also ==
- Emanuele Orazio Fenzi
- Ida Fenzi
- Florence

== Sources ==
Cambridge Journals, Isabella Bigazzi / Zeffiro Ciuffoletti "Palazzo Marucelli Fenzi Guida storico-artistica" Fenzi Family Archive Trust. Archivo Fenzi, Biblioteca de Risorgimento. "Il Possesso di Rusciano" EDIZIONI A.G.M. FIRENZE 1990. The Life of Emanuel Fenzi, Andrea Giutini, Postampa 2002. Verity Family Collection; Glamorgan Records Office, including the letters of Sebastiano Fenzi and Florence Cox from Sant' Andrea.
