= Samuel Nicholson (merchant) =

English wholesale haberdasher (1738–1827)

- Born: September 4, 1738; England
- Died: October 26, 1827 (aged 89); London, England
- Occupation: Haberdasher
- Known for: His social connections with William Wordsworth
- Spouse(s): Mary Haydon and Anne Elizabeth Smith

Samuel Nicholson (1738–1827) was a London wholesale haberdasher, known as a Unitarian and associate of radicals. He is remembered for his social connections with William Wordsworth in the early 1790s.

== Early life ==
Nicholson was born on 4 September 1738, the son of George Nicholson, and grandson of the nonconformist minister George Nicholson (1636–1690) of Kirkoswald, Cumberland. He was in business in London as a wholesale haberdasher, in Cateaton Street. His warehouse was adjacent to his home.

In the 1780s, Nicholson was a member of the Society for Constitutional Information.

== Relationship with Wordsworth ==
Wordsworth met Nicholson through a family connection, Elizabeth Threlkeld, who had been Dorothy Wordsworth's foster mother (1778–1787) in Halifax, Yorkshire. Elizabeth married William Rawson in 1791; they were both Unitarians. They moved to London from Halifax, knew Nicholson, and introduced William to him.

The period when Wordsworth dined regularly with Nicholson has tentatively been placed in spring of 1793. They went together to hear Joseph Fawcett preach. Nicholas Roe has suggested that Wordsworth's further engagement with radical English reformers may trace back to his connection with Nicholson. It has been inferred, by Roe, that Nicholson probably introduced Wordsworth to Joseph Johnson the publisher. Keay places Wordsworth's own radical beliefs in the context of a period 1793–5 and contact with the views and milieu of the Society of Constitutional Information, to which Johnson also belonged: the Norman Yoke, and the Tory Bolingbroke's arguments on capital and corruption.

Nicholson, in any case, is credited with Wordsworth's introduction into the London group of radical dissenters, including William Godwin. They played a significant part in his thinking, until the middle of 1795. "Mr Nicholson" was referenced in the notes to The Excursion.

== Later life ==
Nicholson was a founding partner of the Glasgow Bank in 1809. He acted as trustee of Dr Williams's Library from 1815 to 1827. He died on 26 October 1827, at Ham Common. In the last year of his life he had donated to the orphan school on City Road.

== Family ==
Nicholson married Mary Haydon. Their eldest daughter Caroline married in 1804 Thomas Hockin Kingdon, Fellow of Exeter College, Oxford. Harriet, the fourth daughter, married John Vowler of Parnacott in 1817.

The only son of the marriage was George Thomas Nicholson. He studied at Manchester Academy from 1803 to 1805. In 1806 he matriculated at Trinity College, Cambridge, graduating B.A. in 1809. That year he entered the Inner Temple. He became a barrister, and was President of the National Life Assurance Society; it was founded in 1829, was a mutual insurance company from 1847, and merged with the Mutual Life Assurance Society in 1896 to form The National Mutual Life Assurance Society.

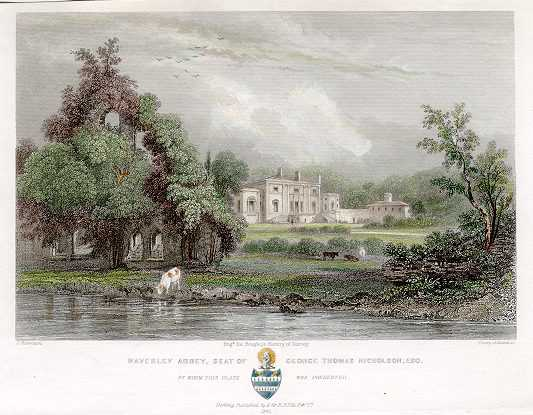
Waverley Abbey House, 1850 engraving

Later in life Nicholson was owner of Waverley Abbey, which he bought from John Poulett Thomson. It had been damaged by fire in 1833, and he rebuilt it. He was High Sheriff of Surrey in 1833, and was elected a Fellow of the Geological Society in 1835.

Nicholson married Anne Elizabeth Smith, daughter of William Smith. Of their children, Marianne, the elder daughter, married Douglas Strutt Galton in 1851. Laura Maria, the younger daughter, married in 1848 John Bonham Carter.

The sons were:

- Samuel Nicholson, the eldest.
- William Smith Nicholson, second son, an army officer, married in 1849 Charlotte Elizabeth Miller, daughter of Sir Thomas Miller, 6th Baronet.
- George Henry Nicholson, called to the bar in 1844.
- Lothian Nicholson.
