= Francesco Franceschi (horticulturist) =

California horticulturist

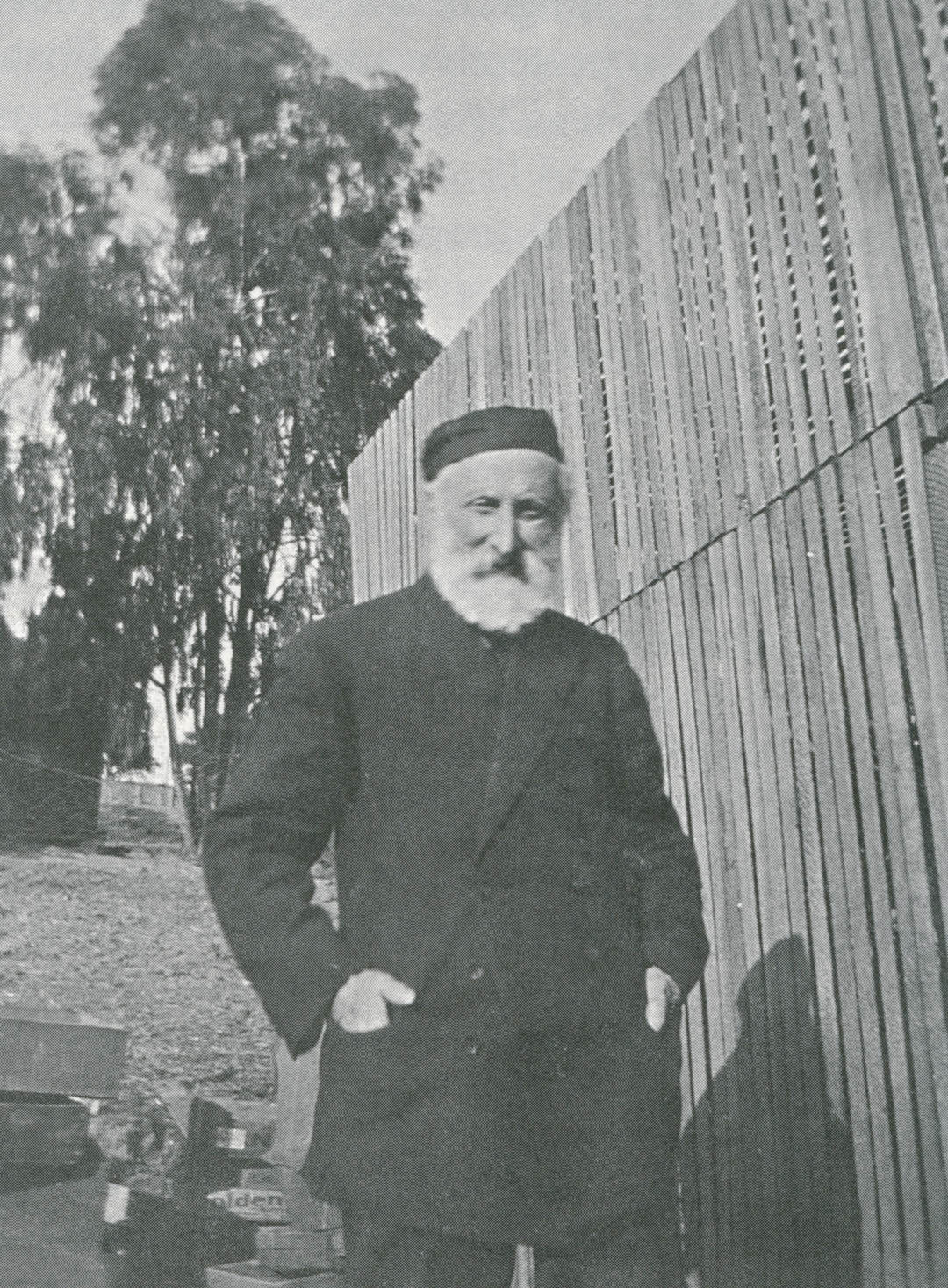
- Dr. Franceschi at his botanical garden in Santa Barbara, California, 1912
- Born: Emanuele Orazio Fenzi; March 2, 1843; Florence, Italy
- Died: November 7, 1924 (aged 81); Tripoli, Libya
- Occupation: Horticulturist

Francesco Franceschi (March 2, 1843 – November 27, 1924) – known in Italy by his title and birth name of Cavalier Emanuele Orazio Fenzi – was an Italian banker and horticulturist who spent part of his later career in the United States, where his efforts contributed to the introduction of new plant species in southern California.

== Early life ==
Cavalier Emanuele Orazio Fenzi was born on March 12, 1843, in Florence, Italy to Orazio Fenzi (1817–1850) and Countess Emilia della Gherardesca (1801–1850), the former being a member of the wealthy Fenzi family involved in banking and railroads. He was the grandson of Emanuele Fenzi, and he was raised at Palazzo Fenzi by his grandparents following the early death of his parents. In 1864, Fenzi, earned a Doctor of Political Science and Administration degree from University of Pisa. Although he manifested an early interest in botany and gardening – especially tropical species – he initially acceded to his grandfather's desire that he go into the Banca Fenzi. He pursued his horticultural interests at the Villa Sant'Andrea in Percussina where he developed a botanical garden. He was a founding member of the Italian Botanical Society (it) in 1888, and he was a member of the Royal Tuscan Society of Horticulture (it), serving first as its secretary and then as its president. Over the course of his life, he developed into an expert on succulents, palms, and bamboo, and he is credited with introducing such species as bamboo and eucalyptus into Italy. In 1878, he introduced the first threshing machine to Italy.

In 1870, Emanuele Orazio Fenzi married his first cousin, Cristina (1851–1927), one of six born to the marriage of Cavalier Sebastiano Fenzi (1822–1901) and Emily Verity (maiden; 1827–1869). In 1891, following an economic crisis in Italy that decimated the family's bank and wealth, and as a part of a major Italian diaspora that began around 1880, Fenzi emigrated with his wife and three of their children to America. For his new life in the United States, he took a new name: Francesco Franceschi.

== California years ==
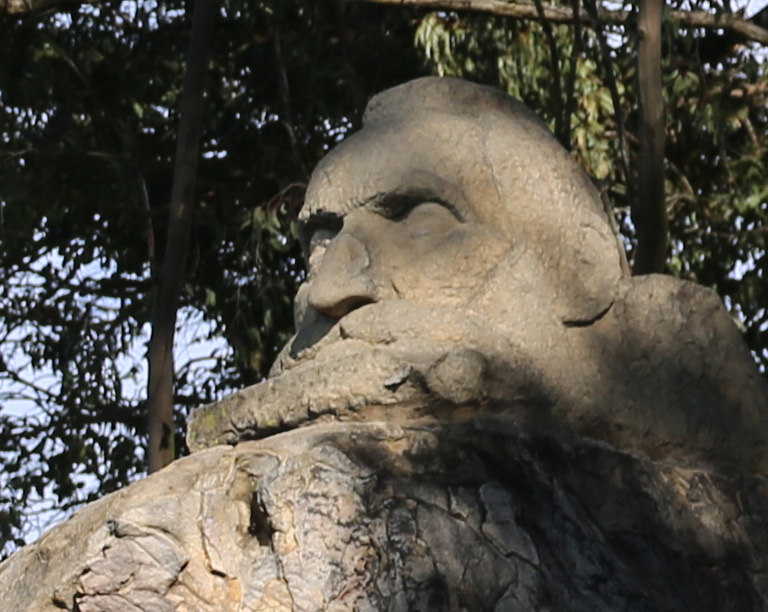
Bust of Francesco Franceschi in Franceschi Park, Santa Barbara

After two years in Los Angeles, Franceschi moved to Santa Barbara. There, he and local landscape architect Charles Frederick Eaton jointly founded the Southern California Acclimatizing Association in 1893 to introduce new species from around the world to California. It was initially headquartered at Eaton's Montecito estate of Riso Rivo, which became a botanical nursery for their experiments in plant propagation. Eaton planted an enormous variety of both native and non-native trees at Riso Rivo, including live oak, camphor, cinnamon, avocado, Abyssinian banana, candlenut, and many species of citrus and palms. Many kinds of seeds were also grown on the estate in their attempt to determine which were suitable for southern California's Mediterranean climate.

The partnership with Eaton ended in 1895 when Franceschi moved the SCAA to Santa Barbara from Riso Rivo, where he ran it as a combination experiment station and commercial nursery. He incorporated the SCAA in 1907 as a partnership with a local nurseryman named Peter Riedel who had immigrated from Holland. During this phase of the SCAA's existence, it propagated trees for use along Santa Barbara's city streets, some of which can still be seen. The partnership ended badly after just two years, in a lawsuit between the partners from which Riedel walked away with both the SCAA and its prime location in downtown Santa Barbara. Today the SCAA is recognized as the first nursery to "scientifically evaluate new plants for California's climatic conditions". The SCAA's 1900 general catalog runs to over 100 pages of trees (especially palms, cycads, and bamboo), shrubs, and flowers. There are special sections on fruit-bearing plants, California natives, trees for street planting, and drought-resistant plants.

In 1903, Franceschi's wife bought 40 acres of land on Mission Ridge Road in Santa Barbara. They named the property Montarioso and built an American Craftsman style redwood house on it. It was one of the earliest houses built in what is now known as Santa Barbara's Riviera. Franceschi turned about 10 acres of the land—which at 800 feet above sea level was in an almost entirely frost-free zone—into a scientifically organized nursery and botanic garden. Franceschi was an early advocate of xeriscaping, and the grounds of Montarioso included many species of cactus, aloe, agave, acacia, and—most spectacularly—a palm tree "amphitheater" embracing about a hundred different species that he had grown from seed. He experimented with the low-growing ornamental frogfruit as an alternative to traditional lawns.

Ultimately, through Franceschi's (and the SCAA's) efforts, some 200 new plant species were introduced to California. Two years before he died, Franceschi was awarded the Frank N. Meyer Memorial Medal by the American Genetic Association in recognition of his contributions to his adopted country. Frank Nicholas Meyer (1875–1918) is the namesake of the award.

Franceschi was the first scientist to describe the Franceschi palm (Brahea elegans), which was named for him. It is currently considered a synonym for Brahea armata, also known as Mexican blue palm, though a few experts hold it to be a locally adapted variety of Brahea aculeata due to its similar morphology and coloration.

During the American years, Franceschi was also a contributor to Bailey's Cyclopedia of American Horticulture and published a comprehensive account of local gardens (Santa Barbara Exotic Flora, 1895).

== Later years and legacy ==
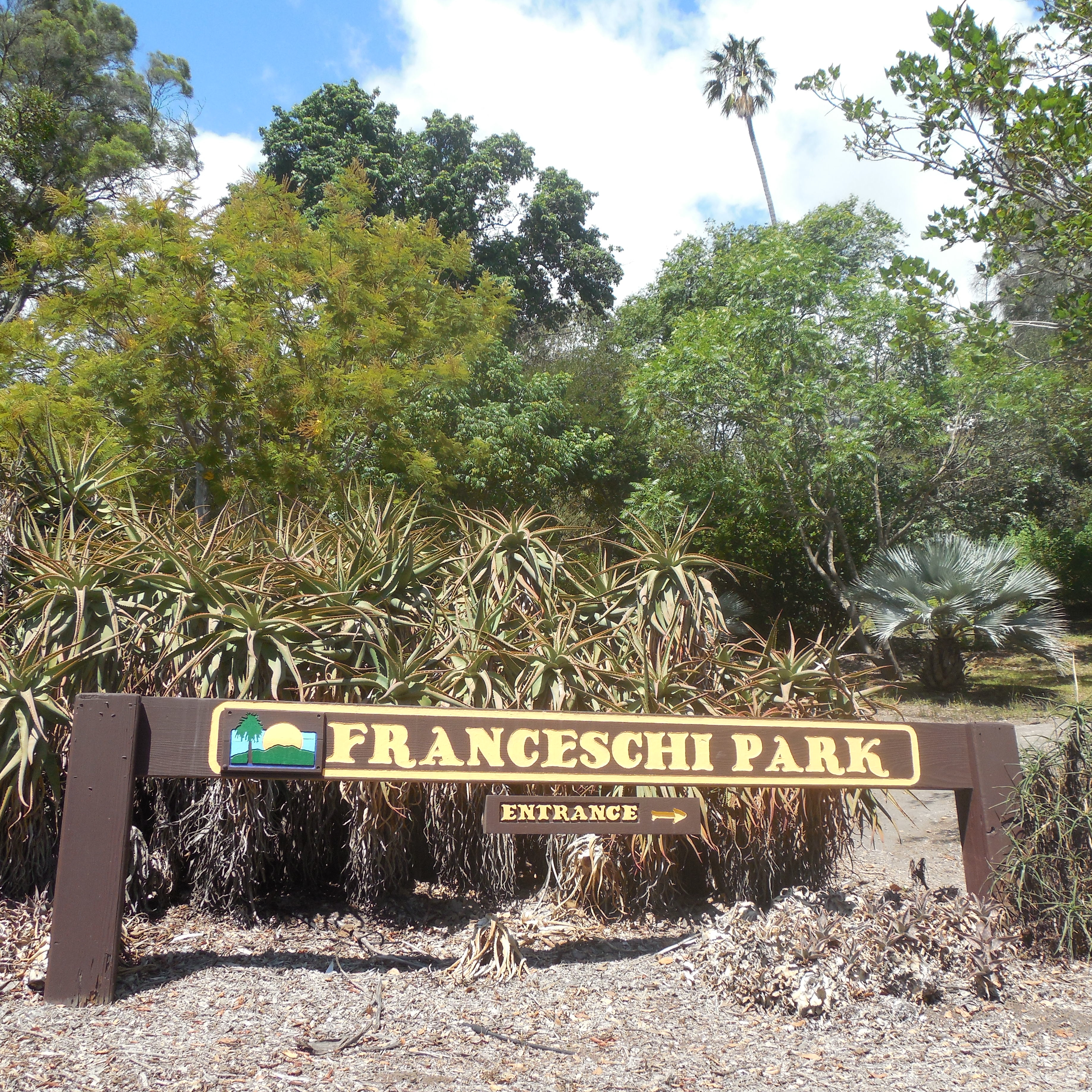
Franceschi Park in Santa Barbara, California

By 1909, partly as a result of the SCAA lawsuit, Franceschi was in financial difficulties. After the city of Santa Barbara failed to take up his proposal to turn Montarioso into a city-sponsored arboretum, he began selling off parts of the property. Not long afterwards, after two decades in southern California, Franceschi moved back to Italy with his wife and took up his birth surname of Fenzi again. In 1912, the Italian government hired him to go to Libya—then the colony of Italian Tripolitania within Italian North Africa—and work on introducing new plant species suitable for the north African climate. In Libya, he started a nursery and a number of related projects: a collection of date species from around Tripoli, a herbarium of native plants, and a reorganization of the library at the School of Agriculture. His plant introductions in Libya include eucalyptus (which his nursery supplied for planting along Libya's railroad lines), avocado, Natal plum, and bamboo.

Fenzi died in Libya in 1924. After his death, part of his Santa Barbara estate was bought by a wealthy American philanthropist, Alden Freeman, who greatly admired Franceschi's work. Through his efforts, the property was enlarged and the house remodeled in a Mediterranean style. In 1931, Freeman donated them to the city of Santa Barbara. The grounds are now open to the public as Franceschi Park, while funds are being sought to convert Franceschi House (which suffered decades of deferred maintenance and general neglect) to a horticultural center.

== Partial list of Franceschi's plant introductions to California ==
- Bailey acacia, 1908
- Blue trumpet vine, 1908
- Brazilian pepper, 1897
- Climbing aloe, 1908
- Floss silk tree, 1897
- Natal plum, 1908
- Pineapple guava, 1905
- Tipu tree, 1897
- Japanese wisteria, 1908

== See also ==
- Franceschi Park, Santa Barbara, major portion founded June 1931; small additions 1962, 1964, and 1976
- Category:University of Pisa alumni (under the name: Emanuele Orazio Fenzi)
- Margaret Bell Douglas (1880–1963), Canadian botanist and horticulturist known for her work in the Southwestern United States and Mexico

== Bibliography ==
=== References to linked inline notes ===
- Beresford, Hattie (May 31, 2007). "The Way It Was – Franceschi and Eaton Landscape Montecito". Montecito Journal. Archived from the original on September 14, 2015.
- "Brahea Elegans". The Palm Society, Northern California Chapter. n.d. Archived from the original on 2016-03-04.
- Butterfield, Harry Morton (August 1964). Dates of Introduction of Trees and Shrubs to California (typewritten manuscript). University of California Davis, Landscape Horticulture Department. pp. 13, 14, 15, 17, 20, 23, 24, 25, 27 – via HathiTrust.
  Note: According to Judith M. Taylor, "Butterfield basically established the field of California horticultural history by himself, writing a long series of articles in the horticultural literature over many years. He did not publish any books. Butterfield spent his entire professional life at the University of California at Berkeley in the agricultural extension department. ("Judith Taylor's Biography". Horthistoria. OCLC 920444163.)
- Chamberlin, Susan (July 2002). "The Life of Dr Francesco Franceschi and His Park [Part I]". Pacific Horticulture. Vol. 63, no. 3. ISSN 0163-7843.
- Chamberlin, Susan (July 2002). "The Life of Dr Francesco Franceschi and His Park – Part II". Pacific Horticulture. Vol. 63, no. 4. ISSN 0163-7843.
- "Franceschi Park". Parks and Recreation. City of Santa Barbara. n.d.
- "Appendix 3: New Garden Plants of the Year 1909". Bulletin of Miscellaneous Information. London: Kew Royal Botanic Gardens. 1910 – via HathiTrust. Re: "Southern California Acclimatizing Association".
  - Bolusanthus speciosus. p. 60.
  - Cephalostachyum pergracile. p. 62.
  - Chamaedorea bambusoides (sv). p. 63.
  - Cocos Arechavaletana. p. 64.
  - Cocos campestris (es). p. 64.
  - Cocos pulposa. p. 64.
  - Erythea Brandegeei (es). p. 67.
  - Erythea elegans. p. 67.
  - Herbertia platensis (sv). pp. 68–69.
  - Livistona mariae. p. 71.
  - Oreodoxa borinquena. p. 75.
  - Pritchardia Wrightii. p. 78.
  - Stereospermum sinicum. p. 83.
  - Xanthosoma nuevoleonense. p. 84.
  - Xylosma Salzmanni. p. 85.
- Passerini, Conte (1925). "Adunanza del 10 Gennaio 1925" [Meeting of January 10, 1925; Eulogy for E.O. Fenzi]. Bullettino della Società Botanica Italiana (in Italian). Florence: Società Botanica Italiana (it): 5. OCLC 944482789 – via Biodiversity Heritage Library.
- Franceschi, Francesco, ed. (Easter 1900). General Catalogue and Garden Guide for the South. Vol. 6. Santa Barbara, California: Southern California Acclimatizing Association. OCLC 228663499 – via Google Books.
- Tomassoli, Laura (1996). "Fenzi, Emanuele Orazio (Emanuelino)". Dizionario Biografico degli Italiani (in Italian). Vol. 46. pp. 152–154. OCLC 5894357533. Archived from the original on 2021-09-30.
- Tucker, John Maurice (January 1943). "Francesco Franceschi". Madroño. 7 (1): 18–27. ISSN 0024-9637. JSTOR 41422470. OCLC 5556999753.
- Verity Family of Bridgend Papers, 1675–1968. Leckwith, Wales: Glamorgan Archives. n.d. Document reference: DXcb.
- "World Checklist of Selected Plant Families (WCSP)". Kew Royal Botanic Gardens. 2009. OCLC 1012534232.

=== General references (not linked to notes) ===
- Beittel, Will (1984). Dr. F. Franceschi: Pioneer Plantsman – A Record of His Distinguished Career in Santa Barbara (monograph). Santa Barbara, California: Santa Barbara County Horticultural Society. OCLC 15640638.
- Chamberlin, Susan (Spring 2002). "A History of Franceschi Park, Santa Barbara, California" (PDF). Eden. Vol. 5, no. 1. Newhall, California: California Garden and Landscape History Society. pp. 5–13. ISSN 1524-8062. OCLC 724267112.
- Franceschi, Francesco (December 1908). "Fifteen Years' Experience in Southern California". The Pacific Garden. Vol. 2, no. 1. p. 9. OCLC 9842079. Continued in the following issues:
  - Vol. 2, no. 2. January 1909
  - Vol. 2, no. 3. February 1909
  - Vol. 2, no. 4. March 1909
- Franceschi, Francesco (January 1, 1911). "Behavior of Alien Plants at Santa Barbara, With Special Regard to Their Naturalization and Phenological Phases". American Breeders Association: Report of the Meeting Held at Omaha, Neb., December 8, 9, and 10 1909, and for the Year Ending 1909. Vol. VI. Washington, D.C.: American Breeders Association. pp. 446–454. doi:10.1093/jhered/os-6.1.446 – via Google Books.
- Franceschi, Francesco (December 1911). "New and Little Known Trees Suitable for Southern California Avenues". Pomona College Journal of Economic Botany. 1 (4). Pomona College: 201–208. OCLC 1049899800 – via Google Books.
- Francesco Franceschi papers, 1904–1918. University of California, Berkeley, Bancroft Library, History of Science and Technology Collection. OCLC 122291041. "Guide to the Francesco Franceschi Papers, 1904–1918". Online Archive of California (OAC)
- Popenoe, Wilson (May 1922). "Dr. Fenzi's Contributions to American Horticulture – The Work of a Pioneer Plantsman in California". Journal of Heredity. 13 (5): 215–220. doi:10.1093/oxfordjournals.jhered.a102208. eISSN 0022-1503. ISSN 1465-7333 – via Google Books.
- "Notizie degli Archivi Toscani". Archivio Storico Italiano (in Italian). 114 (2/3): 320–682. 1956. ISSN 2036-4660. JSTOR 26248511.
