= Marucelli =

Marucelli is a family name of Italian origin. It may refer to:

- Francesco Marucelli (1625–1703), Italian abbot, bibliographer and bibliophile
- Germana Marucelli (1905–1983), Italian fashion designer
- Giovanni Stefano Marucelli (1586–1646), Italian painter and architect
- Paolo Marucelli (1594–1649), Italian architect
