= Palazzo Fenzi =

Palace in Florence, Italy

Coordinates: 43°46′39.47″N 11°15′24.63″E

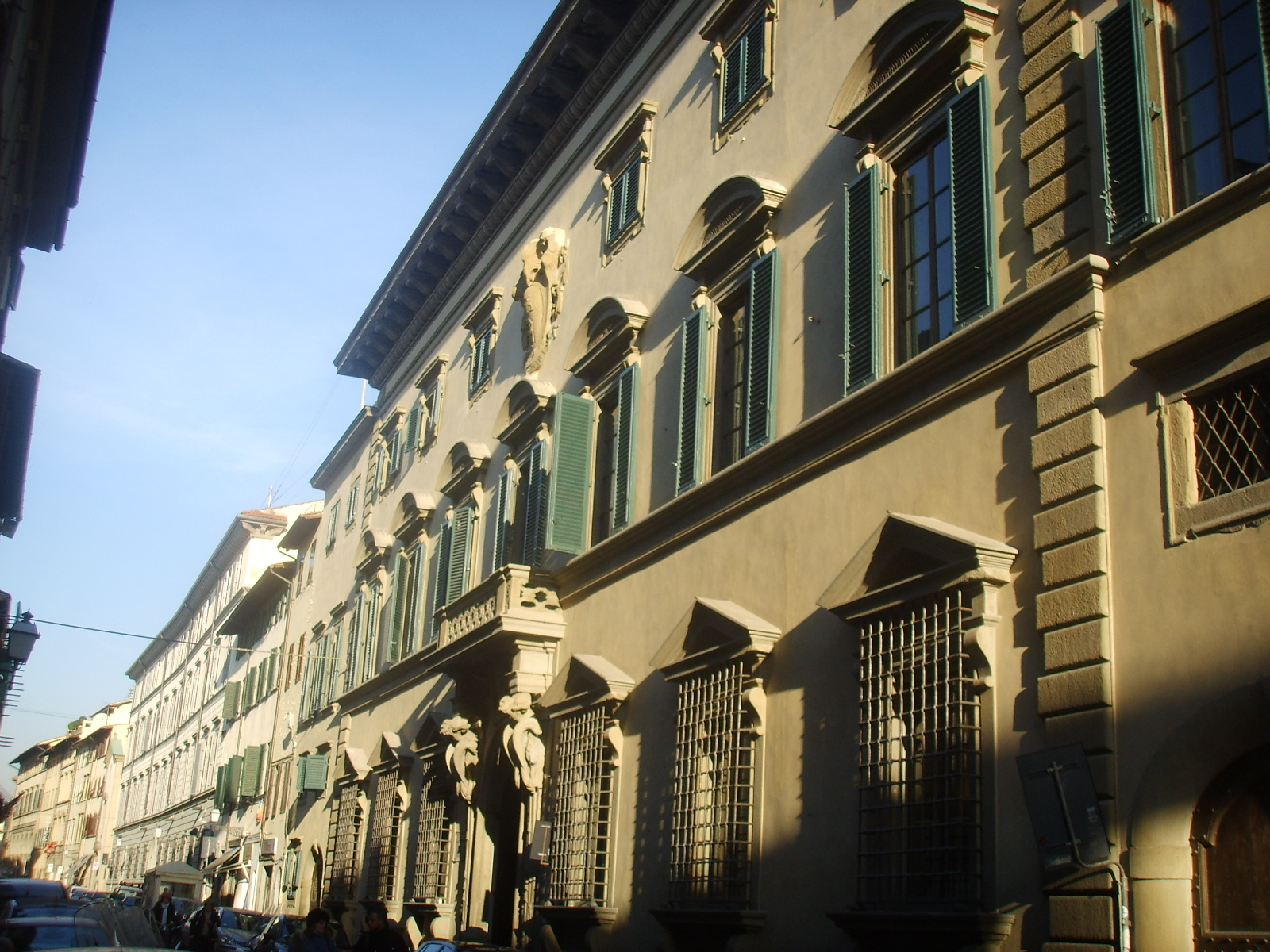
Palazzo Fenzi.

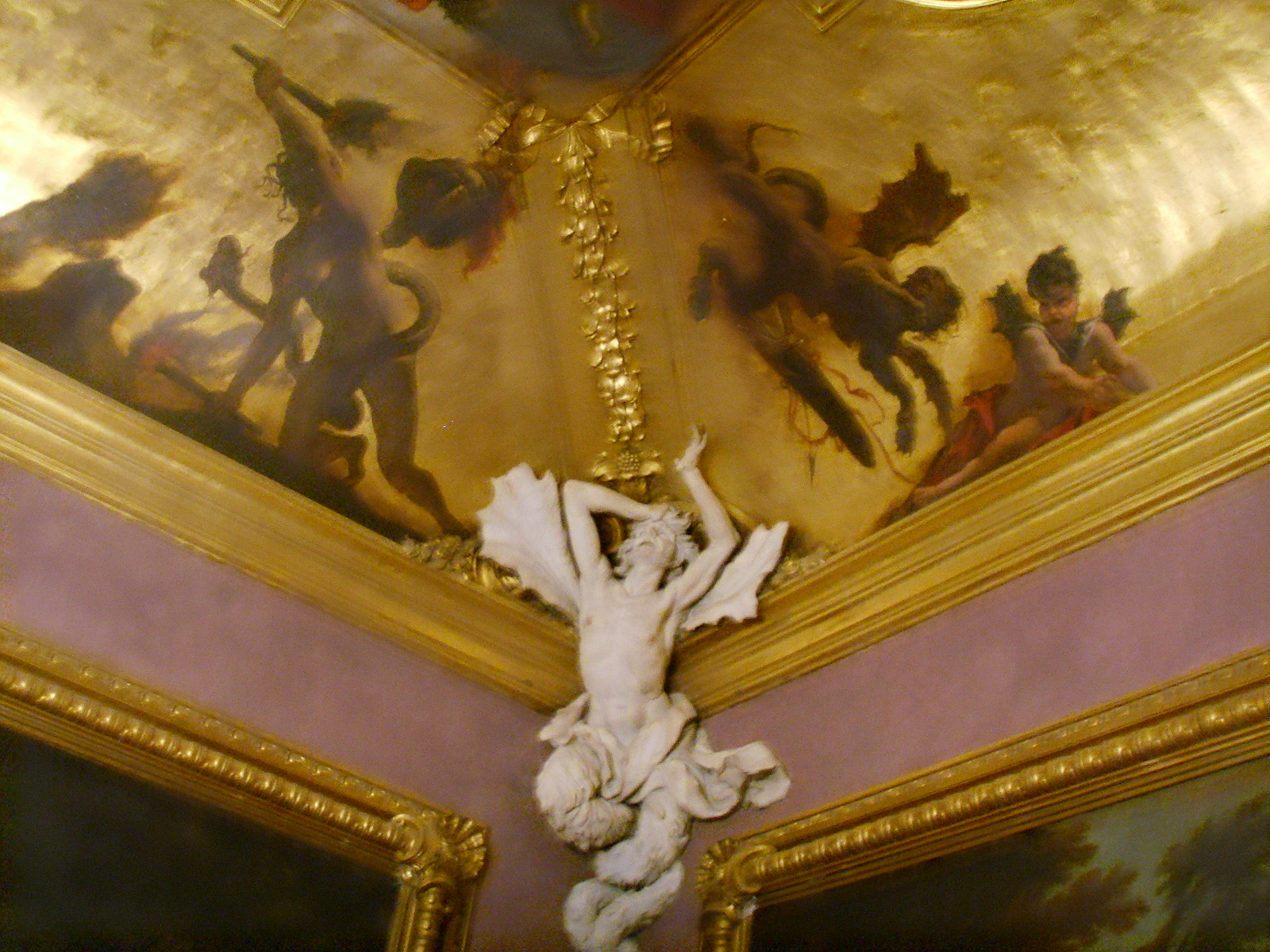
Detail of the decoration.

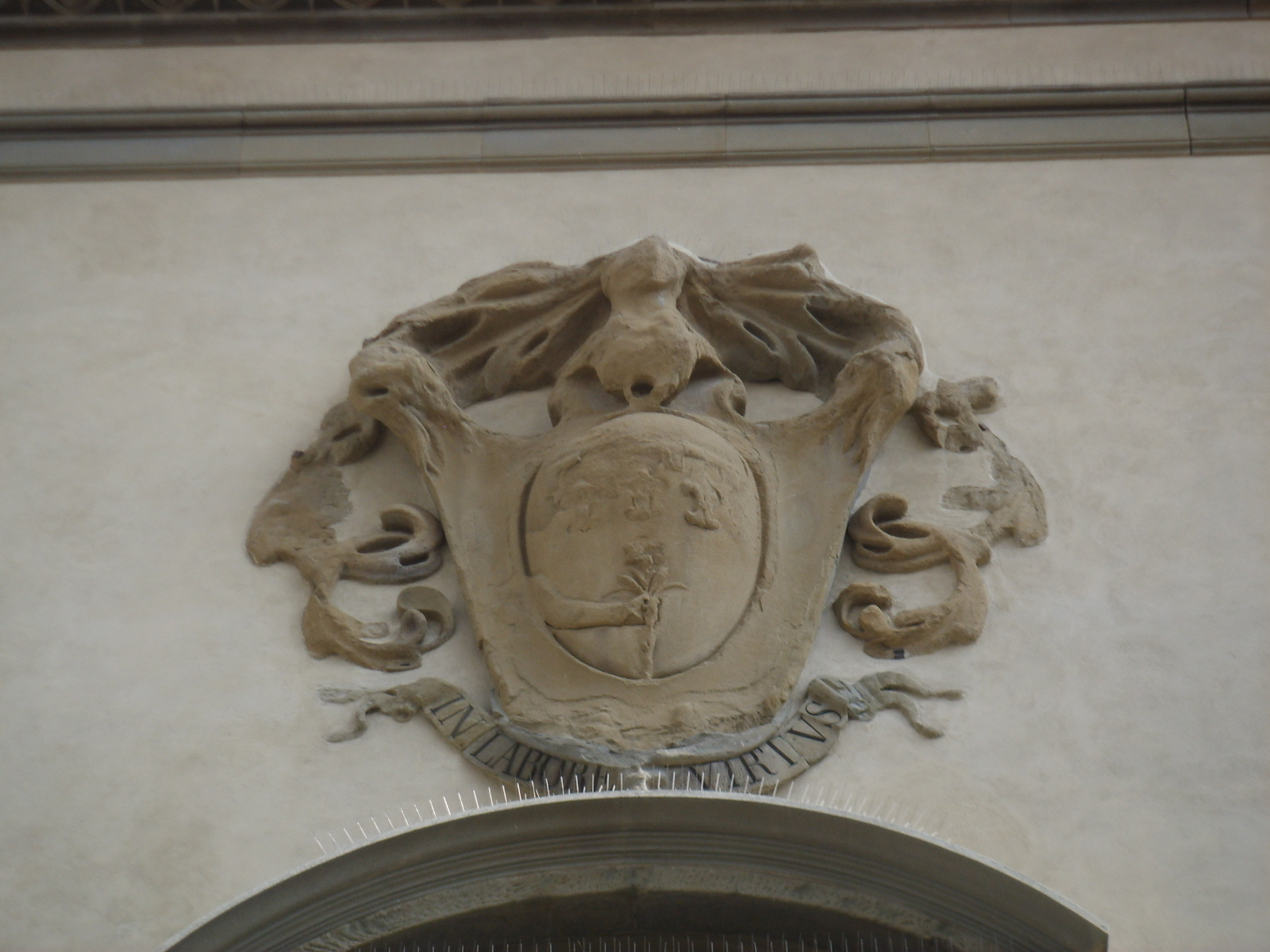
Fenzi coat of arms.

Palazzo Fenzi is a palace located in Florence, Italy. It was built in the 16th century for the Castelli family, with Gherardo Silvani as the architect. The Marucelli family later expanded the building.

In 1829, Emanuele Fenzi purchased the palace to serve as both his family's residence and the headquarters of his bank.

Today, the palace houses the History Department of the University of Florence.

== Interiors ==
Among many other Baroque architectural features such as ornate ceilings and marble sculptures, the Palazzo Fenzi has a wide variety of frescoes, some of which by the painter Sebastiano Ricci. These frescoes were executed during his stay in Florence from 1706 to 1707, and are now considered as some of his masterpieces. During this period he first completed a large fresco series on allegorical and mythological themes in the Marucelli-Fenzi palace before going on throughout Italy and Europe. He was later to influence the Florentine Rococo fresco painter Giovanni Domenico Ferretti.

== Sources ==
- Cambridge Journals, Isabella Bigazzi and Zeffiro Ciuffoletti "Palazzo Marucelli Fenzi Guida storico-artistica" Fenzi Family Archive Trust "Il Possesso di Rusciano". A.G.M., Florence 1990

== See also ==
- Fenzi
