= Frederick R. T. Trench-Gascoigne =

British soldier and landowner

Frederick R. T. Trench-Gascoigne DSO JP

High Sheriff of Yorkshire
- In office 1923–1924
- Preceded by: Sir Algernon Freeman Firth, 2nd Baronet
- Succeeded by: Henry Whitworth

Personal details
- Born: Frederick Richard Thomas Trench-Gascoigne; 4 July 1851
- Died: 2 June 1937 (aged 85)
- Spouse: Laura Gwendolen (after 1892)
- Relations: Richard Oliver Gascoigne (grandfather); Richard Hill, 7th Baron Sandys (grandson)
- Children: 2, including Alvary Gascoigne
- Parent(s): Frederick Charles Trench Gascoigne; Mary Isabella Oliver Gascoigne

Military service
- Allegiance: United Kingdom
- Branch/service: Yorkshire Hussars
- Rank: Colonel
- Battles/wars: Anglo-Egyptian War; Second Boer War

Colonel Frederick Richard Thomas Trench-Gascoigne DSO JP (4 July 1851 – 2 June 1937) was a British soldier and landowner.

== Early life ==
He was born on 4 July 1851, the only son of Frederick Charles Trench Gascoigne JP, and his wife, the former Mary Isabella Oliver Gascoigne.

His mother was the elder daughter and co-heir of Richard Oliver Gascoigne of Parlington Hall, Yorkshire and Castle Oliver, County Limerick. His aunt Elizabeth Oliver Gascoigne was the wife of Frederick Mason Trench, 2nd Baron Ashtown.

== Career ==
Gascoigne was a captain in the Royal Horse Guards and served in the Egyptian War of 1884 to 1885. He was second-in-command and later commanding officer of the 3rd Battalion Imperial Yeomanry in the Second Boer War in South Africa from 1900 to 1901, and was awarded the Distinguished Service Order in 1900. He was lieutenant-colonel and honorary colonel commanding the Yorkshire Hussars in 1903 and an honorary colonel in the British Army in 1904.

Colonel Gascoigne was a Justice of the Peace for the West Riding of Yorkshire, an officer of the Order of St John of Jerusalem, and a member of the Army and Navy Club, the Carlton Club and the Junior Carlton, the Yorkshire Club in York and the Royal Yacht Squadron in Cowes. He was selected High Sheriff of Yorkshire from 1923 to 1924.

== Personal life ==
In 1892, he married Laura Gwendolen (1859–1949), daughter of Sir Douglas Galton and the former Marianne Nicholson. Through her mother Laura was the goddaughter and second cousin to Florence Nightingale. Together, they had two children, a son and a daughter:

- Sir Alvary Douglas Frederick Trench-Gascoigne (1893–1970), who served as the British Political Representative to Japan from 1946 to 1951; he married Sylvia Wilder, daughter of Brig.-Gen. Wilber Elliott Wilder, in 1916.
- Cynthia Mary Trench-Gascoigne (1898–1990), who married Arthur Fitzgerald Sandys Hill, 6th Baron Sandys.
- Edward Oliver Trench Gascoigne (1896–1896), who died as an infant.

The Gascoignes lived at Lotherton Hall, Aberford, Leeds (which he inherited from his aunt, Lady Ashtown, upon her death in February 1893), and Craignish Castle, Ardfern, Argyllshire. Trench Gascoigne died on 2 June 1937. His widow died on 2 July 1949.
