= Gascoigne =

Gascoigne (pronounced, and sometimes spelt, Gascoine or Gascoyne) is a British surname of Old French origin, the regional name of Gascony. The surname first appears on record in England in the early 13th century. Gascoigne or Gascoine may refer to:

== People ==
- Sir Alvary Gascoigne (1893–1970), British diplomat
- Adriana Gascoigne, American executive and activist
- Bamber Gascoigne (1935–2022), English broadcaster and author
- Bamber Gascoigne, fictional character in Charles Lamb's Essays of Elia (essay on Christ's Hospital)
- Ben Gascoigne (1915–2010), New Zealand-born Australian optical astronomer and photometrist
- Sir Bernard Gascoigne (Bernardo Guasconi, 1614–1687), Italian military adventurer and diplomat
- Bianca Gascoigne (born 1987), English model
- Cara Gascoigne (1888-1984), British physical educator, coach
- Caroline Leigh Gascoigne (1813-1883), British writer
- Charles Gascoigne (1738–1806), English industrialist, arms manufacturer and entrepreneur in Russia
- George Gascoigne (c.1535–1577), English poet
- Jill Gascoine (1937–2020), English actress and novelist
- John Gascoigne (disambiguation)
- Sir Julian Gascoigne (1903–1990), British Army general, governor of Bermuda
- Marc Gascoigne (born 1962), English games author and editor
- Marguerite J. Gascoigne, pseudonym of Marguerite Lazarus, née Jackson (1916–2004), British writer
- Paul Gascoigne (born 1967), English footballer
- Phil Gascoine (1934–2007), British comics artist
- Rosalie Gascoigne (1917–1999), New Zealander-Australian artist
- Richard Gascoigne (1579–1661x64), English antiquarian
- Sheryl Gascoigne (born 1965), British television personality
- Stephen Gascoigne ("Yabba") (1878–1942), Australian sports personality
- Thomas Gascoigne (disambiguation)
- William Gascoigne (disambiguation)

Gascoigne may also refer to:

- Oliver Gascoigne, Irish family
- Gascoigne baronets of Yorkshire, England

== See also ==
- Gascoigne Bluff, Georgia, USA
- Gascoigne Road, Hong Kong
- Gascoyne (disambiguation)
- Gascoigne (film), a film about footballer Paul Gascoigne
- Father Gascoigne, fictional character from the video game Bloodborne.
