= Alvary Gascoigne =

British diplomat

Sir Alvary Gascoigne GBE KCMG
- Portrait of Alvary Gascoigne, c. 1930

British Ambassador to Russia
- In office 1951–1953
- Monarch: George VI
- Prime Minister: Winston Churchill
- Preceded by: Sir David Kelly
- Succeeded by: Sir William Hayter

British Political Representative to Japan
- In office 1946–1951
- Monarch: George VI
- Prime Minister: Clement Attlee
- Preceded by: Sir Robert Craigie (1937, as Ambassador)
- Succeeded by: Sir Esler Dening

Personal details
- Born: 6 August 1893
- Died: 18 April 1970 (aged 76)
- Spouses: Sylvia Wilder (m. 1916; div. 1935) Lorna Priscilla Leatham (m. 1935)
- Children: 2

Sir Alvary Douglas Frederick Trench-Gascoigne GBE, KCMG (6 August 1893 – 18 April 1970) was a British diplomat.

== Early life ==
Alvary Douglas Frederick Trench-Gascoigne was born on 6 August 1893. He was the son of Colonel Frederic Richard Thomas Trench Gascoigne and Laura Gwendolen Douglas Galton. His paternal grandmother was the elder daughter and co-heir of Richard Oliver Gascoigne of Parlington Hall, Yorkshire and Castle Oliver, County Limerick. His great-aunt Elizabeth Oliver Gascoigne was the wife of Frederick Mason Trench, 2nd Baron Ashtown.

== Career ==
Gascoigne began military service in the First World War as a Second Lieutenant in the cavalry dragoons. In 1915, he was transferred to the Coldstream Guards (Royal Field Artillery).

=== Diplomatic career ===
Gascoigne's career as a diplomat lasted from 1921 through 1953. In 1925, he was appointed as Second Secretary in the Foreign Office; and he was promoted to First Secretary in 1933.

In August 1939, Gascoigne was named Consul-General for the Tangier Zone and the Spanish Zone of the Protectorate of Morocco, to reside at Tangier. He and Lorna worked to help European Jews who were refugees in wartime Tangier. In August 1941, Gascoigne was promoted to the diplomatic rank of embassy Counsellor.

Gascoigne was the British "Political Representative" in Japan from 1946 through 1951. In 1947 when he was made a Knight Commander of the Order of St Michael and St George. He left Tokyo in 1951.

Sir Alvary was appointed Ambassador Extraordinary and Plenipotentiary at Moscow on 18 October, 1951. In December 1951, he was honored as Knight Grand Cross of the Order of the British Empire.

== Personal life ==
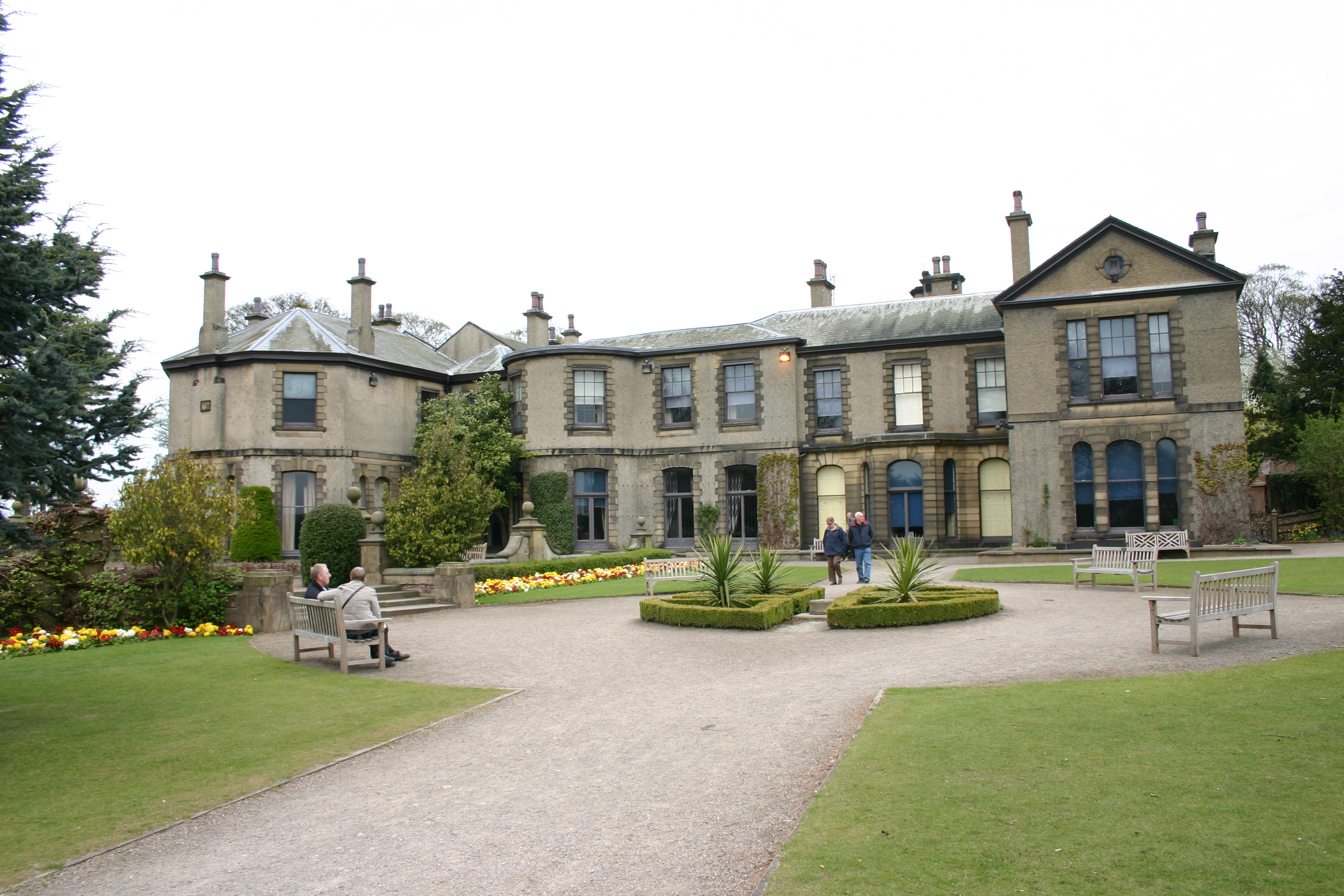
Lotherton Hall, Aberford, near Leeds

In 1916 he married Sylvia Wilder, daughter of Brigader-General Wilber Elliott Wilder. Before his first marriage ended in divorce in 1935, they had two children:

- Douglas Wilder Trench-Gascoigne (1917–1944)
- Yvonne Studd-Trench-Gascoigne (1919–1973)

Later in the same year of his divorce, he remarried to Lorna Priscilla Leatham. On the death of his father in 1937, he inherited Lotherton Hall, the family home, which was purchased by his grandfather in the 1820s. Sir Alvary lived in retirement at Lotherton Hall. In 1968, he presented the Hall and grounds to Leeds City Council. Sir Alvary in 1968 also donated a collection of over 3000 books, pamphlets and periodicals, mainly relating to military and naval history, to Leeds Central Library in memory of his father Colonel F.R.T. Gascoigne.

He died on 18 April 1970 at age 76; and the London Gazette published a notice of Sir Alvary's death.

== Honours ==
- Order of St Michael and St George, Knight Commander (KCMG), 1947.
- Order of St Michael and St George. Knight Grand Cross (GCMG), 1952.
- Order of the British Empire, Knight Grand Cross (GBE).

== See also ==
- List of Ambassadors from the United Kingdom to Japan
- List of Ambassadors from the United Kingdom to Russia
- Anglo-Japanese relations

== Notes ==
Diplomatic posts
Preceded by Sir Robert Craigie	British Political Representative to Japan; 1946–1951	Succeeded by Sir Esler Dening
