= John Gascoigne =

John Gascoigne may refer to:

- John Gascoigne (lawyer) (fl. 1381), English lawyer and author
- John Gascoigne (died 1568), Member of Parliament (MP) for Bedfordshire
- John Gascoigne (died 1557), MP for Thirsk
- John Gascoigne (died 1602), MP for Aldborough
- Sir John Gascoigne, 1st Baronet (died 1637), of the Gascoigne baronets
- Sir John Gascoigne, 5th Baronet (c. 1662–1723), of the Gascoigne baronets

== See also ==
- Gascoigne
