= Elizabeth Gascoigne =

Elizabeth Gacoigne is painted sitting on a stool (second left)

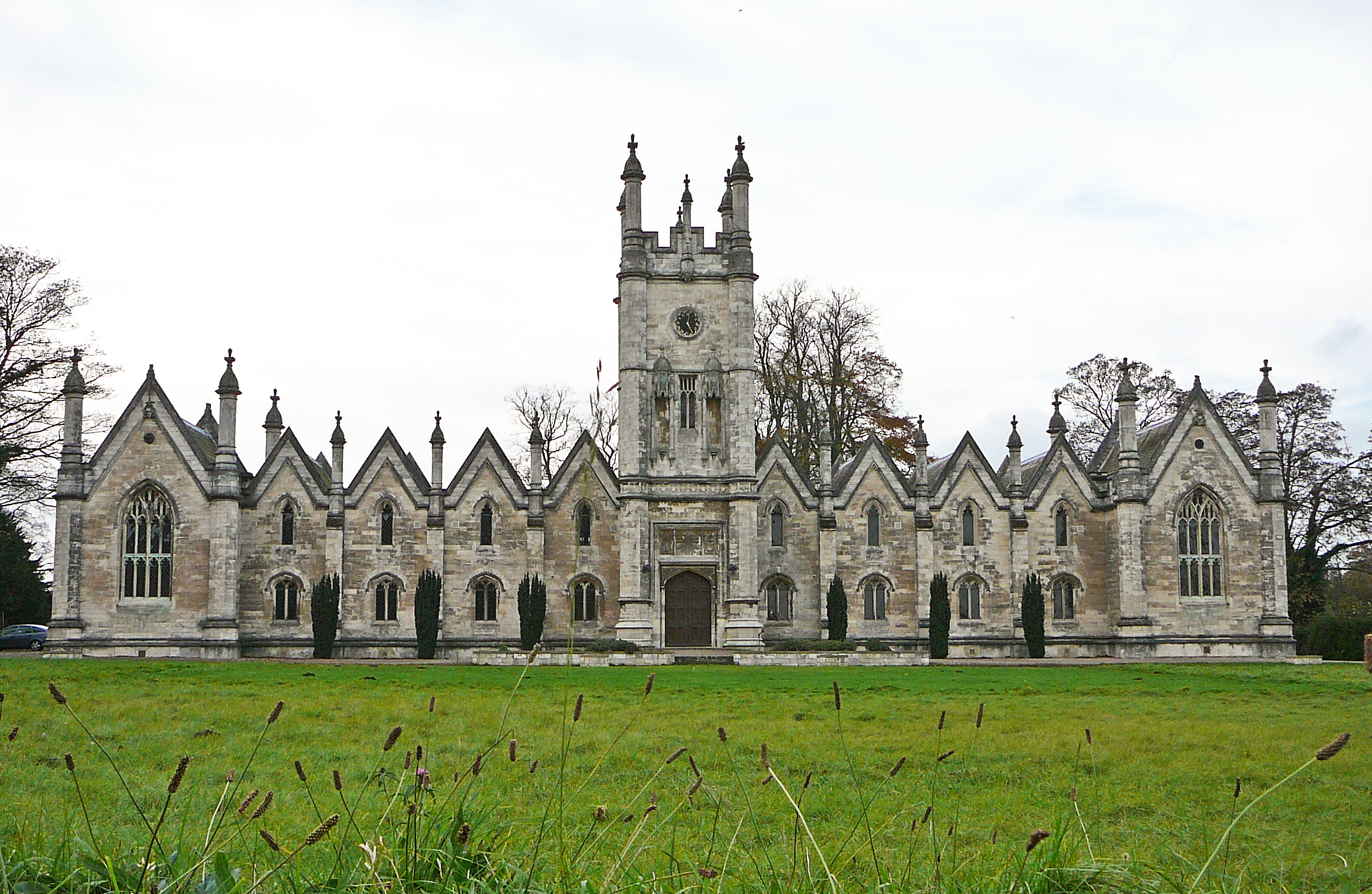
Gascoigne Almshouses, Aberford, built 1843–1845 by George Fowler Jones for Mary and Elizabeth Gascoigne as a memorial to their father and brothers. Now offices. Long ashlar front in Perpendicular Gothic style, with elaborate central tower, many steeply pitched gables, and many outsize octagonal pinnacles. Projecting cross-wings with traceried windows, housing the chapel (l) and refectory (r), the domestic intermediate parts two-storied.

Elizabeth Gascoigne (9 September 1812 – 23 February 1893) was the heiress to the Gascoigne estate, eventually becoming the main owner of Lotherton Hall in Leeds which is now owned by Leeds City Council (since 1968) as part of the Leeds Museums and Galleries. She was a woman of many talents, dabbling in writing books, designing stained glass windows, playing the harp and being a charitable contributor to the community of Leeds, mainly Aberford in Yorkshire and Ashtown in Ireland. Her works in stained glass have been displayed in exhibitions, and many of the buildings her and her sister commissioned are still part of the communities that they lived in.

== Family ==
Elizabeth Gascoigne was born on 9 September 1812. She was the daughter of Richard Oliver Gascoigne and Mary Turner. She was one of four children. Elizabeth Gascoigne had one older sister named Mary Isabella, and two younger brothers named Richard and Thomas Gascoigne. In her childhood Elizabeth, like her sister, was taught how to read, write and be a genteel Victorian woman, with the intention of being matriarch of the household and a supportive wife.

In 1842 tragedy struck the family, as both of the young Gascoigne brothers died, leaving Mary Isabella and Elizabeth Gascoigne as the sole heirs to the Gascoigne estates. In 1843 tragedy struck the family again when her father Richard Gascoigne died, leaving the Gascoigne estates to Mary and Elizabeth. Parlington Hall, which was the family home, was given to the elder of the sisters, Mary, and Lotherton Hall given to Elizabeth. Both women were to inherit and move into the properties once they had married.

== Life ==
Elizabeth and her sister were very active in their community, rebuilding a church at Garforth and homes in the local area. They were thought to be very charitable. In 1844 the Gascoigne sisters commissioned the building of almshouses on the old Great North Road (A1) to commemorate the memory of their father and two brothers. The homes were built for four people, two men and two women, retired tenants of the Gascoigne estate. The building featured stained-glass windows believed to have been designed by the sisters, which were featured in an exhibition in 2004 at Lotherton Hall. Additionally, during the Great Famine of 1846–1847 they travelled to Ireland to help out the workers of Castle Oliver, an estate owned by their father.

On 10 February 1852 Elizabeth married Fredrick Mason Trench, 2nd Baron Ashtown, in Aberford, Leeds, thereby becoming a baroness. He had five children, two daughters and three sons from a prior marriage, making Elizabeth a stepmother.

Lord Ashtown was cousin to Fredrick Charles Trench of Dublin, who married Mary Isabella Gascoigne, Elizabeth's sister. Elizabeth split her time living between Ashtown in Ireland and Lotherton Hall.

On 23 February 1893 Elizabeth died, aged 80, in Montreux, Switzerland, and was buried on 25 February in Territet, Switzerland. She and Lord Ashtown did not have any children of their own, meaning there was no heir to Lotherton Hall; instead her nephew Colonel Frederick Richard Thomas Trench-Gascoigne inherited Lotherton Hall.

== Legacy ==
Elizabeth Gascoigne's legacy lives on in Lotherton Hall where there is a portrait of her, another with her sister, and one portrait of all four siblings. She also has a portrait in the National Library of Ireland. In addition to this the almshouses which she and her sister built to commemorate their father and brothers' memory still stand today and are used as offices.
