= Thomas Gascoigne (businessman) =

Yorkshire land and coal-owner

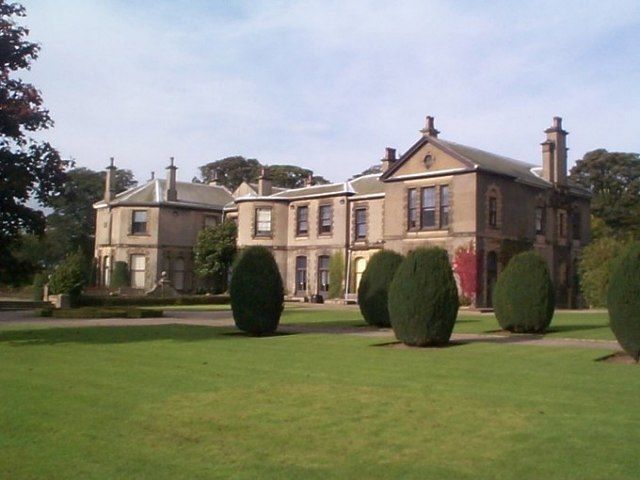
Lotherton Hall

Thomas Gascoigne (7 January 1786 – October 1809) was a Yorkshire land and coal-owner.

He was the son of Sir Thomas Gascoigne, 8th Baronet of Parlington Hall, Aberford, Yorkshire. He was the owner of the mines in the Aberford and Garforth area and the Lotherton Hall Estate in Aberford.

He died either 13 and 20 October 1809 when he suffered a fatal accident whilst hunting. He was buried on 28 October 1809 at Barwick-in-Elmet and over 2,000 people and over 400 of his father's tenants attended his funeral. Lotherton passed to his niece Elizabeth Oliver Gascoigne, who had married Frederick Mason Trench, 2nd Baron Ashtown. Thomas had predeceased his father, who died the following year, and so Parlington Hall passed instead to his step-sister Mary, who had married Richard Oliver of County Limerick.

== See also ==
- Gascoigne family
