= Laura Gwendolen Douglas Galton Gascoigne =

British nurse, writer and singer

Laura Gwendolen Douglas Galton Gascoigne CBE DStJ
- Born: Laura Gwendolen Douglas Galton; 2 March 1859
- Died: 2 July 1949 (aged 90)
- Occupation: Nurse
- Spouse: Frederick Trench Gascoigne (m. 1892; died 1937)
- Children: 3, including Alvary
- Parents: Sir Douglas Strutt Galton (father); Marianne Nicholson (mother)
- Relatives: Florence Nightingale (second cousin)

Laura Gwendolen Douglas Galton Gascoigne CBE DStJ (2 March 1859 – 2 July 1949), was a British nurse, writer, and singer.

She was appointed Commander Order of the British Empire (CBE) in 1918. She was appointed Dame of Justice, most Venerable Order of the Hospital of St. John of Jerusalem.

== Life ==
Laura Gwendolen Gascoigne was the daughter of Sir Douglas Strutt Galton and Marianne Nicholson. Through her mother, Laura Gwendolen, she was the god daughter and second cousin to Florence Nightingale.

=== Marriage ===
She married Frederick Trench Gascoigne on 16 February 1892. He was the son of Colonel Fredrick Charles Trench and Mary-Isabella Oliver Gascoigne; his aunt was Elizabeth Gascoigne, from whom he inherited Lotherton Hall, which the couple used as their family home.

The couple had three children, Alvary Douglas Frederick Trench-Gascoigne (1893-1970), Cynthia Mary Trench-Gascoigne (later Hill) (1898-1990), and Edward Oliver Trench-Gascoigne, who died as an infant.

=== Life at Lotherton ===
In 1905, the couple inherited Parlington Hall and made it their new family home until they demolished it in 1950.

They equipped Lotherton with central heating and electricity, restored the chapel and added a drawing room, dining room, entrance hall, and servant's wing and a lift.

After Frederick died in 1937, Laura used the lift until one day it became jammed and she was stuck in it for several hours. After that she refused to use it and insisted on being carried up to bed.

==== First World War ====
During the First World War Lotherton Hall was transformed into a Voluntary Aid Detachment hospital, catering to injured soldiers. Gascoigne was Commandant of the hospital and her daughter Cynthia was on the nursing staff. Cynthia was also in charge of the soldier's entertainment and organized card parties, concerts, and shoots on the estate. Due to her work in the war, Laura Gwendolen was awarded a CBE in 1918. The following year she was also awarded the title of Lady of Grace of the Order of St. Johns Jerusalem.

==== Gardens ====
Gascoigne had a keen interest in gardening Along with her friends, William Goldring and Ellen Willmott, she designed the eight acre Lotherton gardens to complement the rooms of the house. The gardens are made up of walled roses, a rockery and herbaceous borders.

=== Death ===
After her death, Lotherton Hall was passed down to her son Sir Alvary Gascoigne.
