= Thomas Gascoigne =

Thomas Gascoigne may refer to:

- Thomas Gascoigne (academic) (1404–1458), vice-chancellor of Oxford University
- Sir Thomas Gascoigne, 2nd Baronet (1596–1686)
- Sir Thomas Gascoigne, 8th Baronet (1745–1810)
- Thomas Gascoigne (businessman) (1786–1809), British mine owner
- Thomas Gascoyne (1876–1917), English cyclist
- Thomas Gascoigne (footballer) (1899–1991), English footballer
