= Gascoigne baronets =

Extinct baronetcy in the Baronetage of Nova Scotia

Coat of arms of the Gascoigne baronets

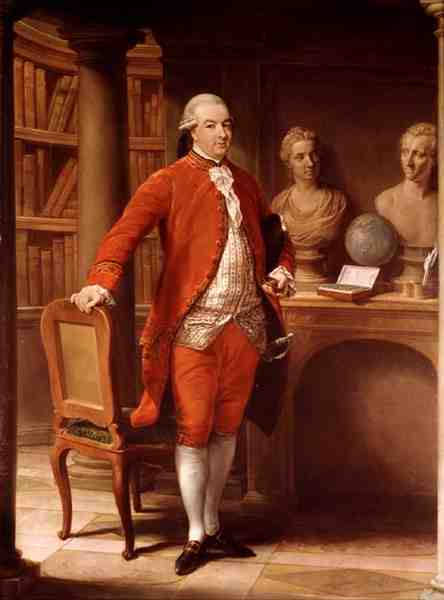
Sir Thomas Gascoigne, 8th Baronet

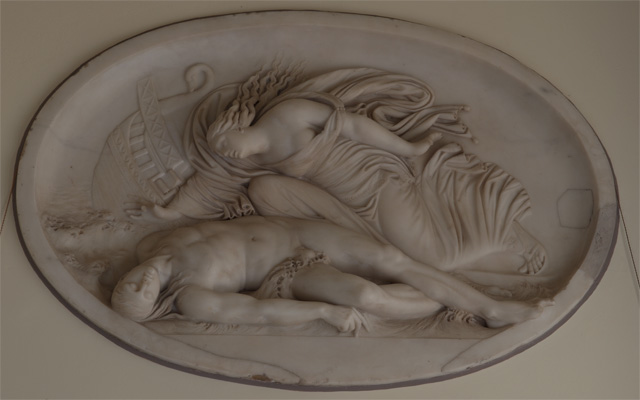
Alcyone and Ceyx marble bas relief

The Gascoigne Baronetcy, of Barnbow and Parlington in the County of York, was a title in the Baronetage of Nova Scotia. It was created on 8 June 1635 for John Gascoigne. He had converted to Roman Catholicism in 1604. His daughter, Catherine Gascoigne, went to Cambrai where she became an abbess. Gascoigne's son Sir Thomas, 2nd Baronet, was accused of conspiracy to murder King Charles II as part of the mythical Popish Plot, but acquitted. The eighth Baronet was Member of Parliament for Thirsk, Malton and Arundel. He renounced Catholicism, and was much involved in the Irish Parliament and in horse racing. Sir Thomas died in 1810, the year after his only son died in a hunting accident, upon which the baronetcy became either extinct or dormant.

The surname Gascoigne derives from Gascony in France. The best-known family of this name is believed to have come to England at the time of the Norman Conquest, settled in Yorkshire, although this is not proven. The Gascoignes were established by the thirteenth century at Gawthorpe and Harewood; these estates passed in 1567 to the Wentworth family by the marriage of the Gascoigne heiress. The junior branch acquired estates at Lasingcroft in 1392 and moved in the 16th century firstly to Barnbow near Leeds and then to Parlington Hall, Parlington, situated west of Aberford, near Leeds, acquired from the Wentworths in 1546.

Sir Thomas Gascoigne, 8th and last Baronet, succeeded his brother in 1762. He left his property, including Parlington Hall, to his stepdaughter on the condition that her husband, Richard Oliver of Castle Oliver in County Limerick, change his name to Richard Oliver Gascoigne (see Oliver Gascoigne). In 1825, Richard acquired Lotherton Hall from a fellow turf enthusiast. In 1843 the estates were inherited by Richard Oliver Gascoigne's two daughters, Mary Isabella and Elizabeth, who took one estate each on their marriages.

Mary Isabella and her husband Frederick Charles Trench, who took the surname Trench Gascoigne, lived at Parlington, while Lotherton became the property of Elizabeth Gascoigne, who married Frederick Charles' cousin Frederic Mason Trench, 2nd Baron Ashtown. The Ashtowns lived mostly in Ireland, on the estates of the Trench family and at Castle Oliver, and when in 1893 Elizabeth died, leaving no children of her own, Lotherton passed to her nephew Colonel Frederick Richard Thomas Trench-Gascoigne, (4 July 1851 – 2 June 1937), from the Royal Horse Guards and a DSO in 1900, a well-known soldier and traveller of the day.

Colonel Gascoigne further inherited Parlington in 1905, but preferred Lotherton. The furnishings and some structural items from Parlington Hall were transferred to Lotherton, after which Parlington was allowed to decay until, apart from the west wing, still standing, it was demolished in a number of stages from around 1911 to 1968. The most prominent artefact removed to Lotherton Hall was the Thomas Banks bas-relief marble of the classic scene Alcyone and Ceyx.

The Gascoignes continued at Lotherton Hall until the death of Sir Alvary Gascoigne, a.k.a. Sir Alvary Douglas Frederick Trench-Gascoigne, (6 August 1893 – 18 April 1970), formerly a British Ambassador to Japan, 1946 – 1951, or rather a Political advisor to Japan, 1946–1951, British Ambassador to Russia, 1951 – 1953, a CMG in 1942, KCMG in 1948, GBE in 1953, whose son, Captain Douglas Wilder Trench-Gascoigne, (11 November 1917 – August 1944) had predeceased him while fighting in WWII, in August 1944.

The property was presented to the people of Leeds [maintained by Leeds City Council] for the public benefit and is now open to the public.

The Gascoigne pub, in Garforth, is named after the Parlington family and also Colonel Gascoigne a local Colliery owner. It has been given the title 'Lord' Gascoigne. The 'Lord' part, being fictitious.

== Gascoigne baronets, of Barnbow and Parlington (1635) ==
- Sir John Gascoigne, 1st Baronet (died 1637)
- Sir Thomas Gascoigne, 2nd Baronet (c. 1596 – c. 1686)
- Sir Thomas Gascoigne, 3rd Baronet (c. 1623–1698)
- Sir Thomas Gascoigne, 4th Baronet (c. 1659-c. 1718)
- Sir John Gascoigne, 5th Baronet (c. 1662–1723)
- Sir Edward Gascoigne, 6th Baronet (died 1750)
- Sir Edward Gascoigne, 7th Baronet (died 1762)
- Sir Thomas Gascoigne, 8th Baronet (1743–1810)
Gallery of Gascoigne baronets
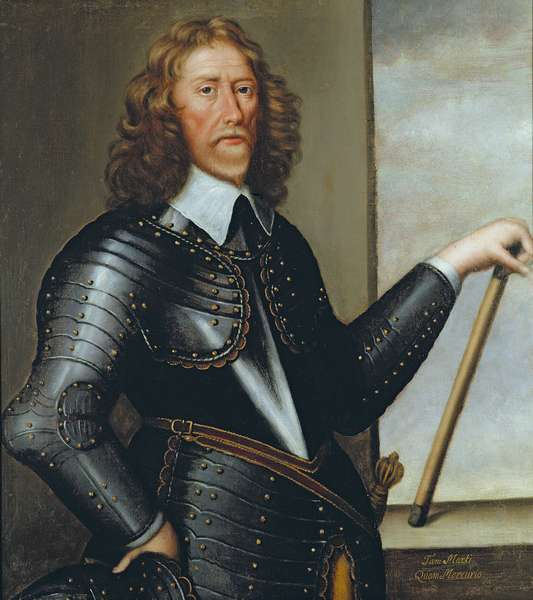
Sir Thomas Gascoigne, 2nd Baronet

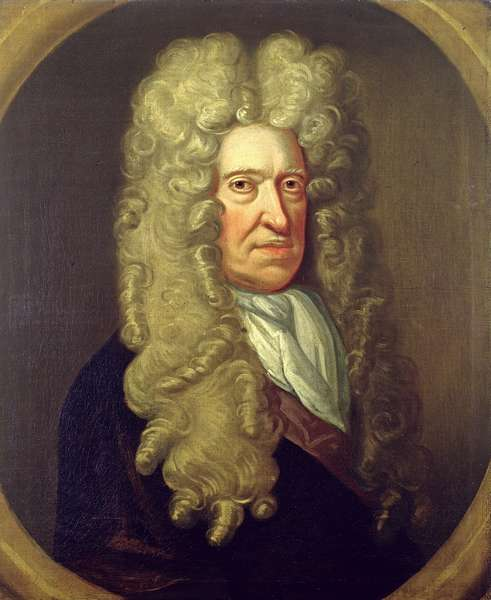
Sir Thomas Gascoigne, 3rd Baronet

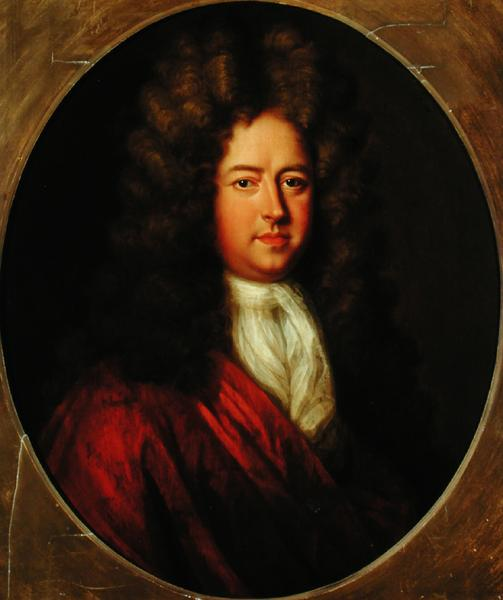
Sir John Gascoigne, 5th Baronet

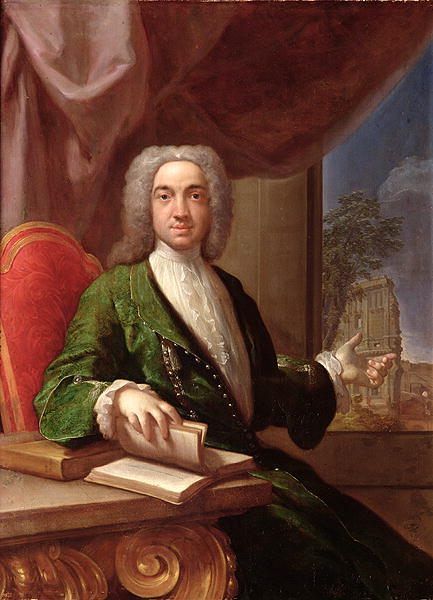
Sir Edward Gascoigne, 6th Baronet

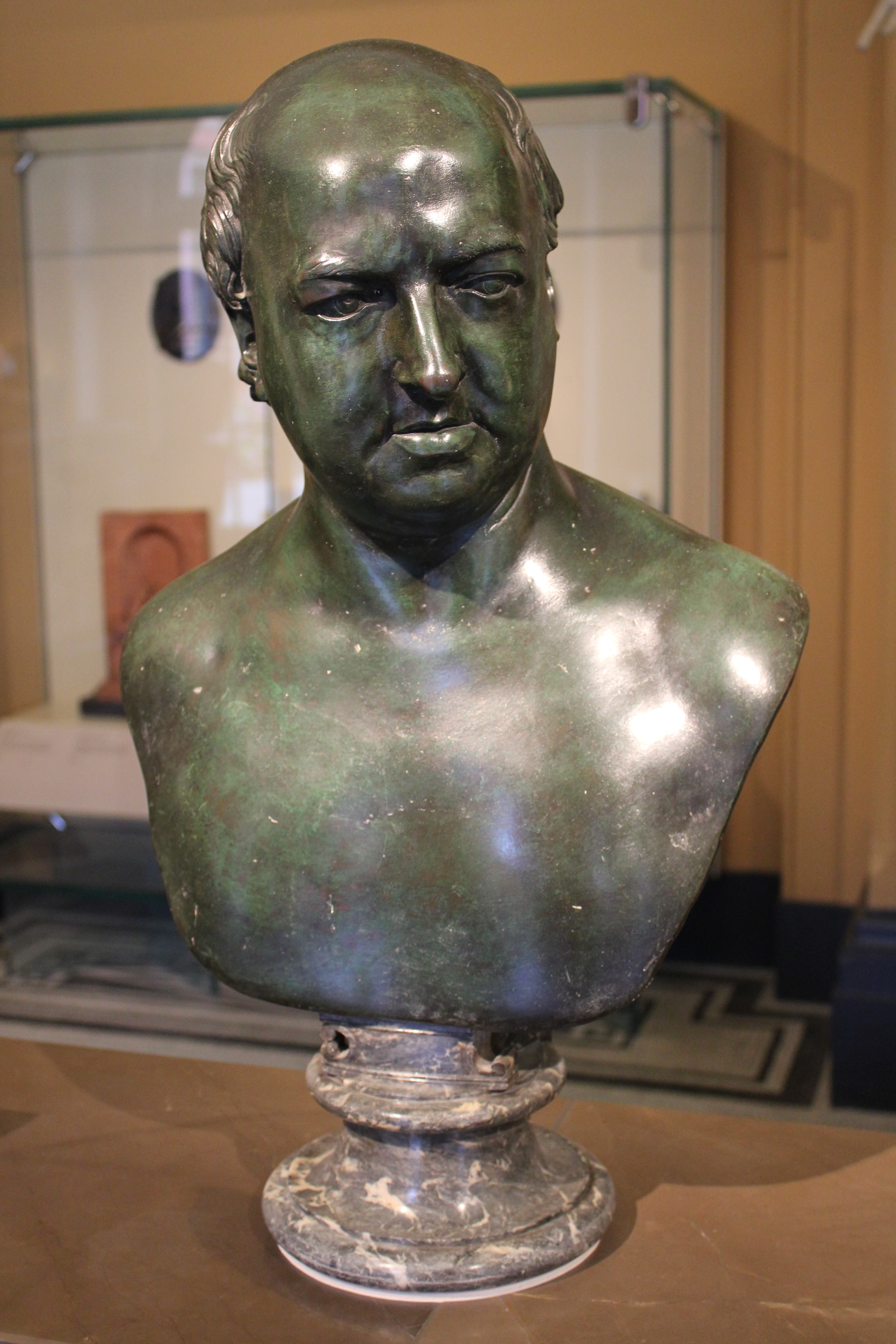
Sir Thomas Gascoigne, 8th Baronet
