= Lotherton Hall =

Country house in West Yorkshire, England

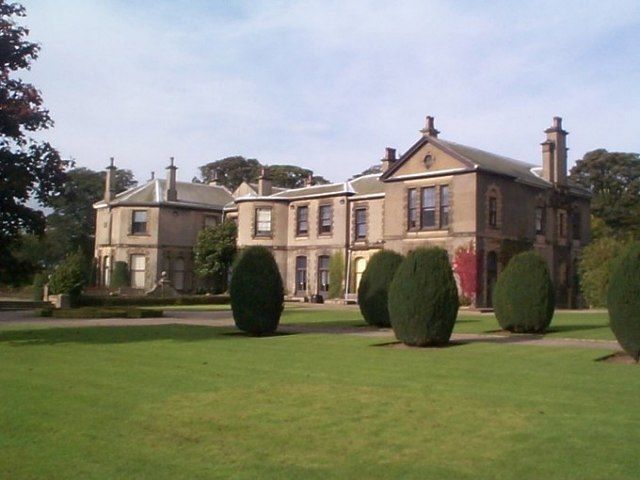
- Lotherton Hall, 2006
- Interactive map of the Lotherton Hall area

General information
- Type: Country house
- Location: Aberford, West Yorkshire, England
- Coordinates: 53.8184°N 1.3185°W
- Year built: by 1775

Website
- museumsandgalleries.leeds.gov.uk
- Established: 6 August 1969
- Collection size: 3,000 objects (in five collections)
- Visitors: 453,335 (2018)
- Owner: City of Leeds

Lotherton Hall is a country house near Aberford in West Yorkshire, England. It is a short distance from the A1(M) motorway, 200 miles (320 km) equidistant from London and Edinburgh. It is part of the Leeds Museums & Galleries group.

A manor house has occupied the site of the hall from at least 1775, when it appears on Thomas Jeffery's map of Yorkshire. The house was owned by Thomas Maude, who bought it from George Rhodes in 1753 for £4,115. Ownership then passed to Wollen and then to John Raper. In 1824 John Raper died and his son and heir, John Lamplugh Raper, sold the property to Richard Oliver Gascoigne in 1825.

After Richard Oliver Gascoigne's death in 1842, Lotherton was inherited by his unmarried daughters, Elizabeth and Mary Isabella. Richard Trench Gascoigne took up ownership of the house in 1893 following the death of his aunt Elizabeth who had married Lord Ashtown. It became the main residence of the Gascoigne family after the death of Richard's father Frederick at Parlington Hall in 1905. Between 1914 and 1918, the Hall was used as a V.A.D. hospital. A 12th-century Norman chapel in the grounds, in use until 1830, was renovated between 1913 and 1917 and used as part of the V.A.D. hospital.

The hall is on the Gascoigne estate, and was presented to the City of Leeds in 1968 by Sir Alvary Gascoigne and his wife, last of the Gascoigne family, whose roots were at Parlington Hall. The hall and parkland were opened for public access on 6 August 1969, exactly 25 years after Sir Alvary Gascoigne's only son and heir, Douglas Gascoigne, was killed in a tank battle in Normandy. The estate is home to a collection of endangered bird species and a herd of red deer. There is a large expanse of grassland in front of the bird garden, typically used during the summer months for ball games and picnics. Another field is used to host shows, such as an annual motorcycle show.

The hall was extensively rebuilt during the Victorian and Edwardian eras. It holds an art collection that includes the Gascoigne Gift, given to the City of Leeds along with the hall, which sits alongside collections of fine and decorative arts added to the collection since becoming a museum in 1968.

The hall is licensed to hold wedding and civil partnership ceremonies.

== Gascoignes at Lotherton Hall ==
Lotherton Hall came into the possession of the Gascoigne family when it was purchased in 1825 by Richard Oliver Gascoigne. He would have assumed he had secured a male heir, as he had raised two adult sons, one of which would inherit. In 1842 both his sons died leaving the Gascoigne estate to be inherited by his daughters after he died the following year.

The sisters divided the Yorkshire estates between them, Mary Isabella took Parlington Hall and Elizabeth took Lotherton. During Elizabeth Gascoigne's ownership, she and her husband Fredrick Mason Trench, the 2nd Baron of Ashtown, whom she married in 1852, mostly let Lotherton to tenants, preferring Castle Oliver in Ireland, along with Woodlawn, Lord Ashtown's own family residence in County Galway, Ireland. Lord and Lady Ashtown did however seem to use Lotherton as their Yorkshire seat for a time in the 1850s. On Elizabeth's death in 1893, Lotherton was inherited by her nephew, Colonel Fredrick Richard Thomas Trench Gascoigne who was a noted soldier and traveller.

Census returns during the period that Lotherton Hall was let (1842–93) show that Elizabeth and Mary Isabella Gascoigne’s cousin, R. S. (Richard Silver) Oliver (1812–89), grandson of the Rt Hon Silver Oliver (1736–98) and son of Robert Oliver (c. 1774–1834), was living at Lotherton Hall as head of household in 1851. Widowed Ann Hornby was head of household at the 1861 census. Richard F. Shawe, recorded as living ‘from investment’, was head of household at the 1871 census, with Shawe’s widow, Anna Shawe, a 'landed proprietor', head of household in 1881. Lotherton Hall was unoccupied at the 1891 census.

Colonel Gascoigne's wife, Gwendolen, was the daughter of engineer Sir Douglas Galton, and second cousin and god daughter to Florence Nightingale. Colonel Gascoigne preferred Lotherton Hall to Parlington, moving many of the furnishings from Parlington to Lotherton. Parlington was demolished in 1950s. Between 1896 and 1931 the Gascoignes remodelled Lotherton to accommodate their growing family, adding a dining room, entrance hall, drawing room and servant's wing. Mrs Gascoigne designed and built the Edwardian style gardens along the south front. Colonel and Mrs Gascoigne had three children together, Alvary, Oliver (who died as an infant) and Cynthia.

Sir Alvary Gascoigne was the British ambassador to Japan and Moscow. He inherited Lotherton in 1937 and lived there with his second wife, Lorna Priscilla Gascoigne. While at Lotherton he enriched the house with oriental works of art he had acquired as an ambassador. He and his first wife, Sylvia Wilder, had a son, Douglas Wilder Gascoigne, who was killed in action during the Second World War. With no heir left to inherit Lotherton, Sir Alvary presented the hall to the City of Leeds in 1968 as a gift to be open to the public. He also gave an endowment fund to buy works of art to further the collection. He died in 1970.

== Lotherton Hall hospital ==
The Gascoignes were patriotic and felt it was their duty to help the war effort during the First World War. In November 1914, Lotherton Hall was transformed into a Voluntary Aid Detachment (V.A.D) hospital for wounded soldiers. The hospital was run by Mrs Gascoigne (Laura Gwendolyn Gascoigne née Galton), with help of VAD volunteer nurses and her daughter, Cynthia. The hospital's eighteen beds increased to thirty five by the end of the war.

Between 21 November 1914 and 28 March 1919, 655 soldiers were treated there. The Gascoignes funded the hospital refusing any government grants or aid. Colonel Gascoigne volunteered as an ambulance driver on the western front and their son, Alvary, served in the army. Their support in the war effort was appreciated by the local community and the St Johns Ambulance Service and in 1918, Mrs Gascoigne was awarded a CBE.

== Collections ==
Lotherton Hall contains around 3,000 objects from five collections. The Gascoigne gift, less than a third of the collection, was given in stages between 1955 and 1979 and comprises paintings, sculpture, furniture, silver, jewelry, porcelain, prints, drawings and textiles. The costume collection is made up of historic and modern clothes and accessories. The Eastern pottery and porcelain collection was in the most part given by Frank Savery in 1966. The collection of modern craft includes ceramics, furniture, jewelry and metalwork by leading British artists. The Cooper Collection, on loan from a private owner, includes Victorian and early-20th century furniture and ceramics.

=== Paintings ===
Notable paintings in the collection include:

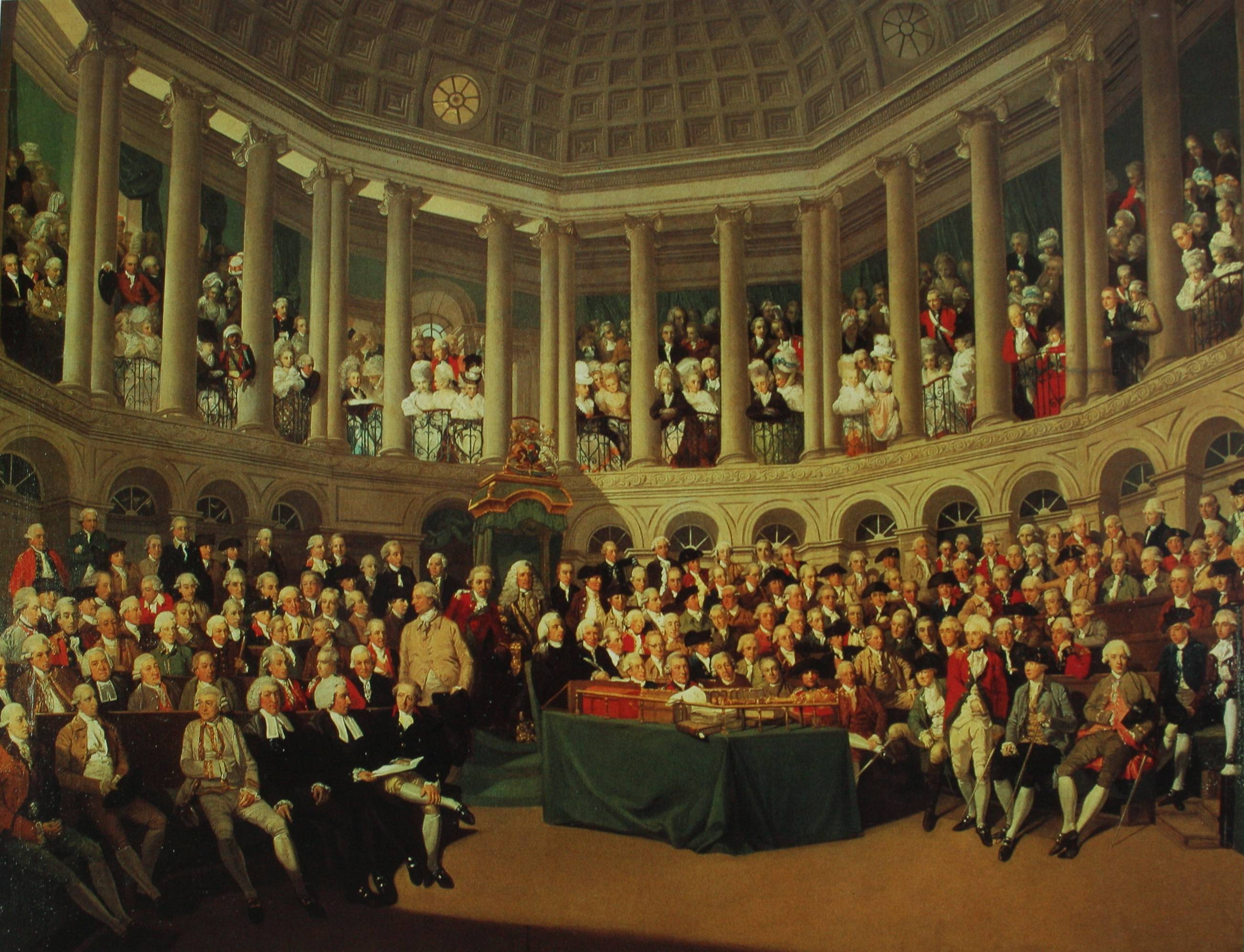
The Irish House of Commons in 1780 by Francis Wheatley

The Irish House of Commons (1780) by Francis Wheatley (1747–1801) – a large-scale group portrait showing Henry Grattan making a speech on the repeal of Poynings’ Law during a debate in the Irish House of Commons on 19 April 1780.

Portrait of Sir Thomas Gascoigne (1779) by Pompeo Batoni (I708-87) – painted in Rome during Sir Thomas Gascoigne’s Grand Tour, Sir Thomas is shown as a connoisseur surrounded by books, sculptures and a globe. Sir Thomas is also holding a snuff box bearing the portrait of Marie Antoinette.

Five Impressionist paintings by Joaquín Sorolla y Bastida (1863–1923) – A Lady and a Dog on the Beach (1906), Ladies on the Beach (1906), People Sitting on the Beach (1906), The Beach (1906) and The Bridge (1906)

Four portraits and three landscapes by George Clausen (1852–1944) – The Miller’s Man (1888), The Shy Girl (1897–1907), Lady Beatrice (1908), Reading by Lamplight (Twilight: Interior) (1909), The Village at Night (1903), Misty Morning and The Village Green at Night.

Lotherton Hall also houses work by Mark Senior (1862–1927) (a member of the Staithes Group), Philip Wilson Steer (1860–1942) and Edward Atkinson Hornel (1864–1933)

=== Furniture ===
Notable furniture in the collection includes:

Neo-Gothic designs by Augustus (A.W.N.) Pugin (1812–52) – Footstool and pair of dining chairs made for George IV by Morel and Seddon c. 1828 for Windsor Castle and oak armchair made for the Jacksons of Kelwood Grove, Yorkshire c. 1865 after a Pugin design of 1835.

Neo-Gothic design by William Burges (1827–81) – Centre table made c. 1867 for Burges's rooms at 15 Buckingham Street, London and later transferred to Burges’s new home (Tower House, 29 Melbury Road, Kensington). Red, black and gold painted oak frame supporting top of marble inlay (pietra dura).

Neo-Gothic oak wardrobe designed by Collier & Plucknett and decorated with allegorical paintings of the seasons and the winds by J. Moir Smith.

Art nouveau high-backed chair designed by Charles Rennie Mackintosh (1868–1928)

Arts and Crafts and Aesthetic Movement furniture designed by Ernest Gimson (1864–1919), C. F. A. Voysey (1857–1941), Edward William Godwin (1833–86), Gordon Russell (1892–1980), Morris & Co., Philip Webb (1831–1915), Frank Brangwyn (1867–1956) and Jennens & Bettridge (specialists in papier-mâché)

Georgian furniture by Gillows of Lancaster, including a dining table commissioned by Richard Oliver Gascoigne for Parlington Hall, soon after he inherited the Gascoigne estate in 1810.

Victorian marquetry designs by Charles Bevan, including a suite of furniture manufactured by Marsh and Jones of Leeds, commissioned by Titus Salt Junior (youngest son of Sir Titus Salt) for Salt Junior's home at Baildon Lodge and later moved to his new house at Milner Field.

=== Gascoigne silver collection ===
The Gascoigne collection includes a series of silver horse racing cups from 1776 to 1842. They include the Doncaster Cup for 1776, produced by William Holmes. A large silver cup by Robert Salmon is dated 1779 and commemorates Soothsayer and Jerry, two of the most successful horses owned by Sir Thomas Gascoigne, 8th Baronet, whose stables were at Parlington Hall. The Beverley Cup of 1809 and the Lincoln Cup of 1822 are both by Robert Garrard.

The collection also includes a Communion Cup and Cover by John Harrington of York. While made in 1628, Harrington’s design draws on an earlier Elizabethan style. A silver paten of 1719 by Seth Lofthouse is also notable.

Two tankards – one Swedish from the late-17th century and the other probably made in Moscow in the mid-18th century – are examples of fine imports in styles that were popular throughout Europe.

=== Portrait miniatures ===
The Gascoigne gift includes ten portrait miniatures. A snuffbox bearing a portrait of Marie Antoinette, significant because Sir Thomas Gascoigne holds this snuffbox in his left hand in Pompeo Batoni’s 1779 portrait which is also on display. The most accomplished miniature is a half-length portrait of Catherine, the elder daughter of Silver Oliver (Gascoigne), by Richard Cosway (1742–1821). An important name in English miniature portraiture, Cosway was appointed Painter to the Prince of Wales (later George IV) in 1785 (the only time that this title was awarded)

=== Chinese ceramics ===
The Gascoigne gift (1968) and the Frank Savery bequest (1966) include collections of Chinese ceramics.

The earliest material is Neolithic (4th–2nd millennium BC), including decorated funerary vessels.

Han dynasty ceramics (206 BC–AD 220) include a tiger decorated roof-ridge tile, while Early Yue wares (late 3rd–4th century AD) include a water pot in the form of a lion. The Tang dynasty (AD 618–906) is represented, including grave offerings in the form of animals, such as a colourfully glazed camel and a naturalistic horse.

Song dynasty porcelain (10th–13th century AD) includes a water sprinkler decorated with animal heads for use in a Buddhist temple and a water dropper in the form of a duck (part of a scribe’s ink-set)

The Ming dynasty (AD 1368–1644) is represented by a seated female figure in green and yellow glazed stoneware (perhaps an ancestor or goddess for use in a temple), a wine jar with the painted scene of a scholar in a garden and a bowl with a finely painted bird decoration.

Painted porcelain produced for European export (famille verte) during the Qing dynasty (Kangxi period AD 1662–1722) includes a vase with an elaborate narrative scene of mounted warrior, men and women in a garden.

=== 18th and 19th century pottery and porcelain ===
Chinese armorial porcelain (late-18th century) – Sir Thomas Gascoigne, 8th Baronet commissioned a dinner service (c. 1770) for Parlington Hall and, ten years later, a tea service. Both armorial porcelain services feature the Gascoigne crest (a pike’s head) of which 63 items from the dinner service survive, along with 22 items from the tea service. This represents a fraction of the original, with the dinner service likely to have featured at least 100 meat plates and 50 soup plates (a total of only 29 plates survive)

Other significant ceramic designers and manufacturers displayed include William de Morgan, Burmantofts Pottery and Leeds Pottery

=== Modern craft studio pottery ===
Lotherton Hall houses a small collection of modern craft studio pottery, including works by significant potters such as Alison Britton, Michael Cardew, Michael Casson, Joanna Constantinidis, Hans Coper, Elizabeth Fritsch, T. S. Haile, Bernard Leach, Janet Leach, Lucy Rie and Sutton Taylor.

== Medieval chapel ==
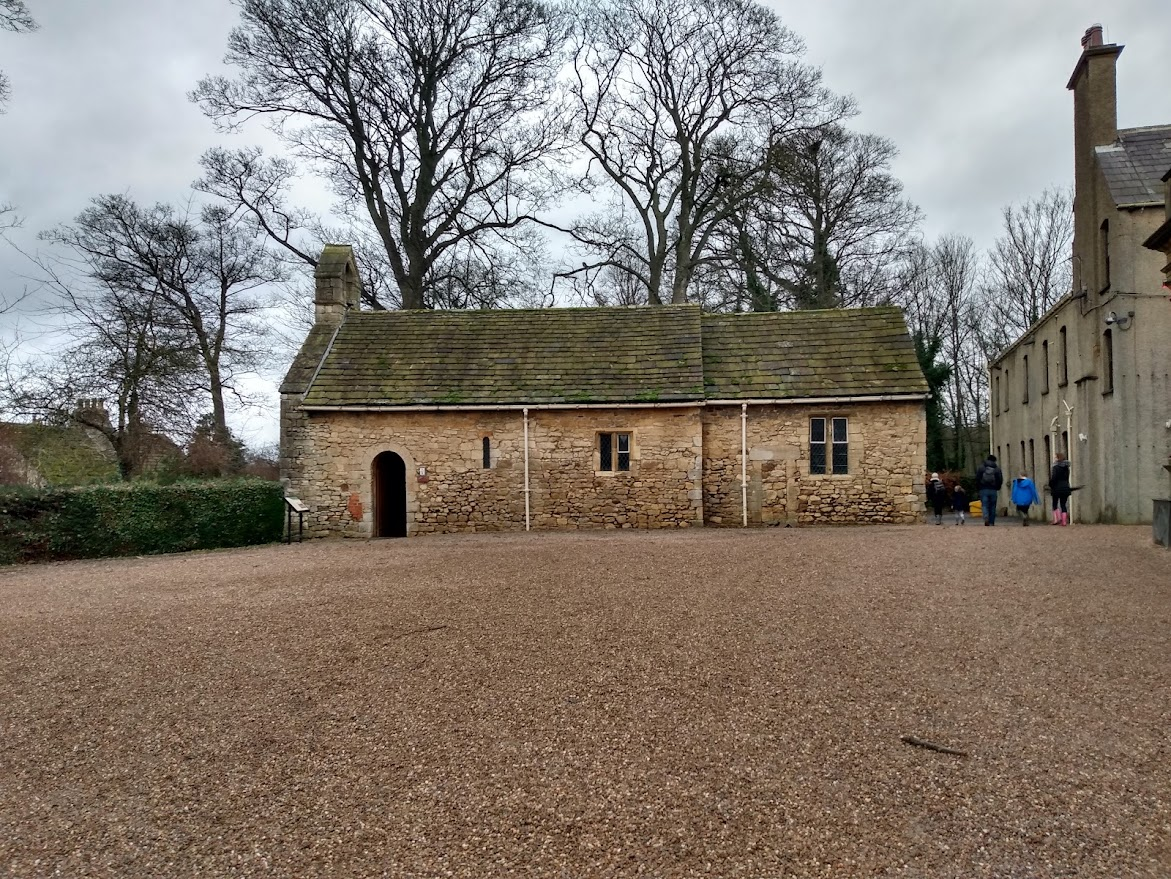
The chapel

The chapel was built in 1100s to serve as a place of worship for the former village of Lotherton.

During the First World War, it was restored by Colonel and Mrs Gascoigne to house wounded soldiers and as a place of worship. Inside the chapel is a memorial piece dedicated to the soldiers who fought and were treated at Lotherton. Inside the pulpit is a prayer desk that was carved by soldiers at the hospital as a form of occupational therapy.

== Gardens ==
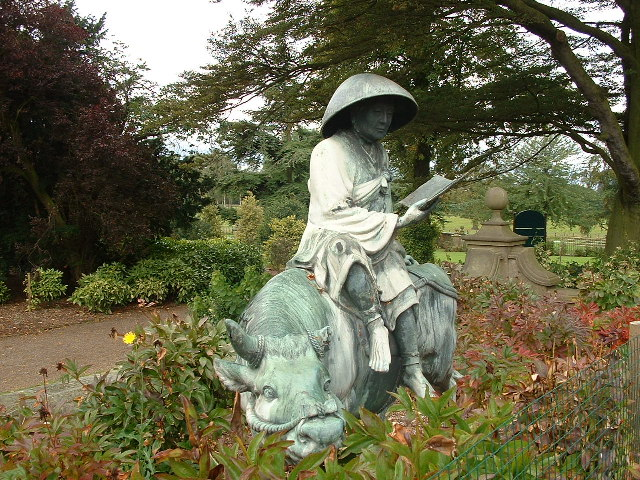
Statue of Sho Haku

The gardens were designed by Mrs Gascoigne (Laura Gwendolen Gascoigne) in the early 20th century before the First World War. Mrs Gascoigne was a notable gardener and had famous gardening friends of the time. The gardens are a collection of several features, each with their own characters to complement the different styles of the rooms in the house. At the far end of the house there is a statue of Sho Haku, the peony priest, a Japanese holy man known for his love of peonies.

== Wildlife ==
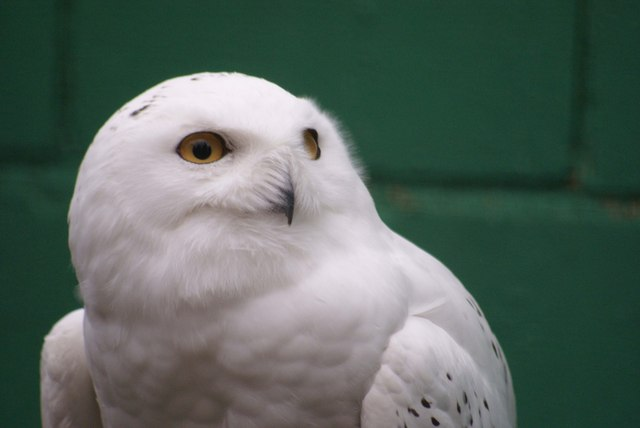
Snow Owl in Lotherton Bird Gardens

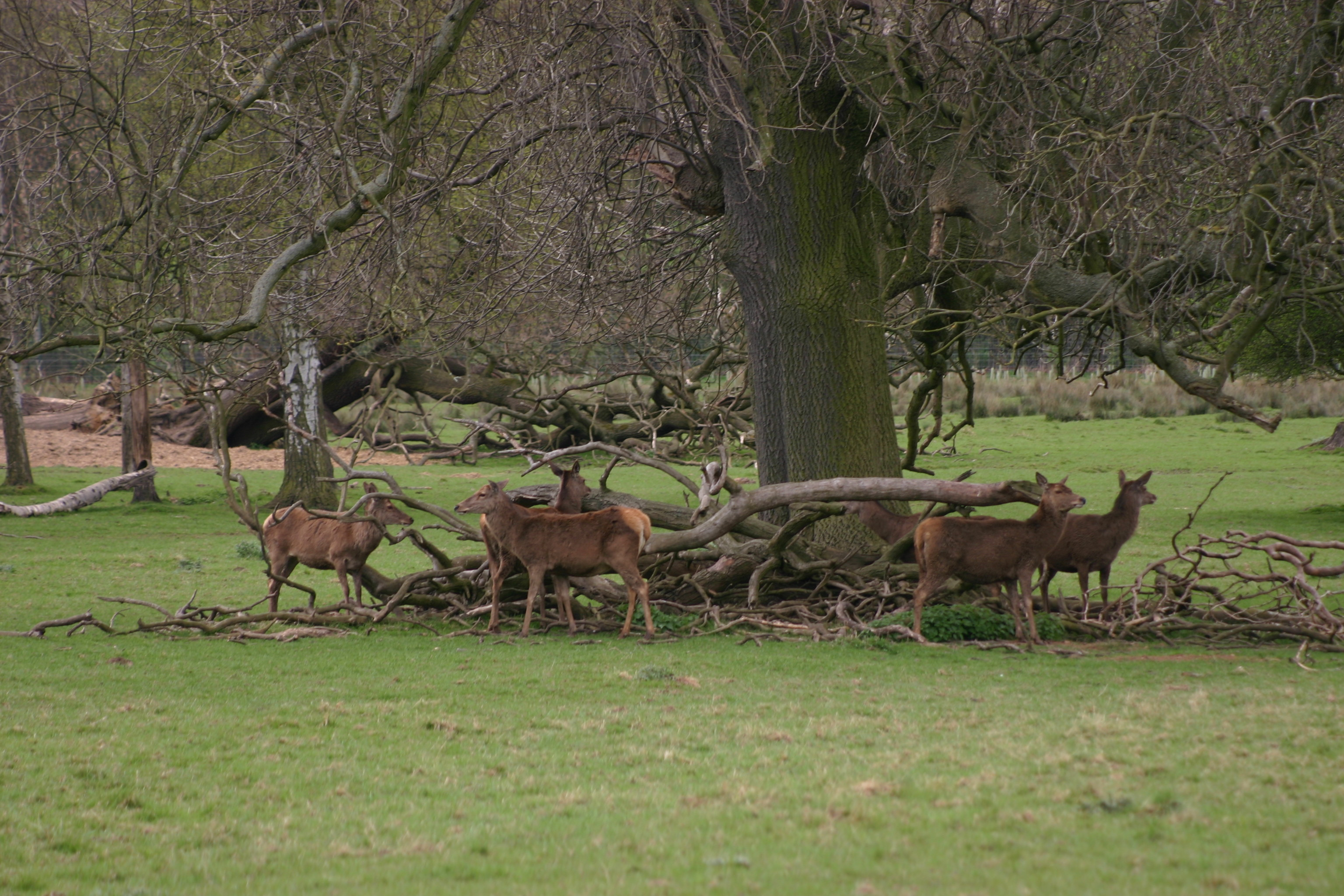
Red Deer on the Lotherton Estate

The bird gardens were opened in 1980; originally it was the site for the old kitchen gardens and greenhouses north of the walled gardens. In 1984 they were expanded and have developed into a major attraction, consisting of over two hundred species of birds, from six different continents around the world.

In 2003, a walk-through aviary called 'Into Africa' was introduced, within it is a mix of African species.

In 2005, the bird gardens celebrated its 25th anniversary with two more developments. The deer park was created in the early 1980s; a herd of deer were moved to Lotherton from Temple Newsam. Later, a herd of red deer were introduced to the estate and are the only breed of deer still present on the estate.

== Statistics ==
In 2018, Lotherton attracted 453,335 visitors, making it the second most visited paid attraction in Yorkshire and Humber. Furthermore, when Lotherton Hall introduced its Christmas Experience between 25 November and 23 December 2016, 64,743 people attended the event, which was a large increase in number compared to 2015 when only 8,920 people attended the event in the same period. This also led to 494 new memberships to Lotherton compared to 236 in 2015 and generated £282,613 for the estate. The festive event included a twelve days of Christmas walk around the woods and garden, an elf village with Santa's Grotto. As of 2019 a new skating rink was introduced.
