= Robert Craigie (diplomat) =

British ambassador

Sir Robert Craigie GCMG CB PC
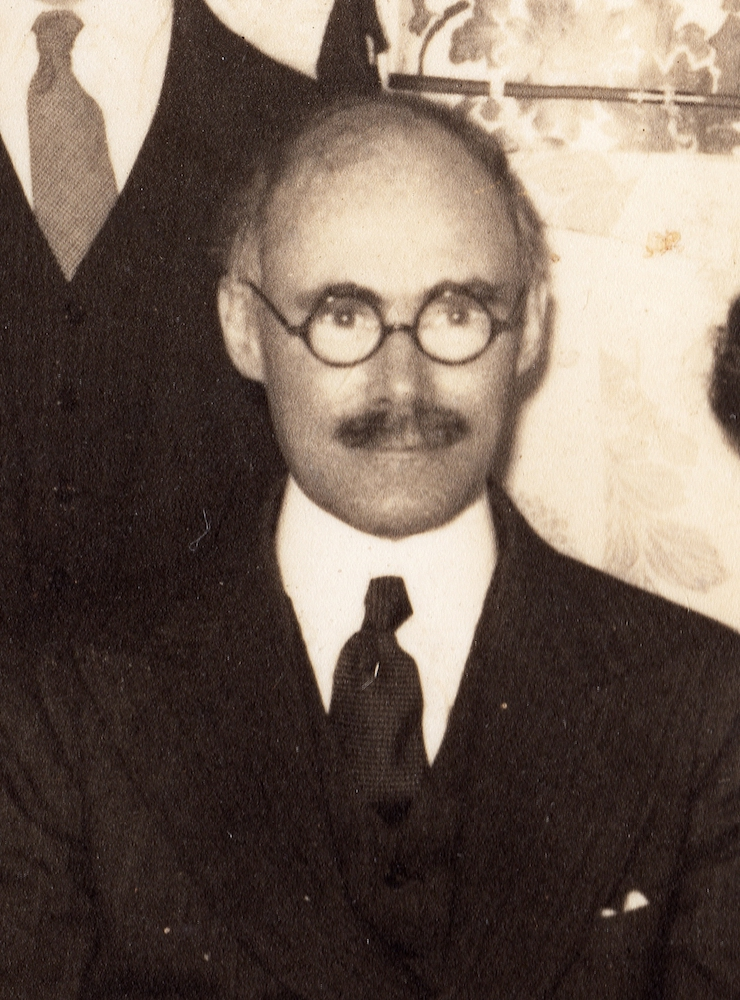

British Ambassador to Japan
- In office 1937–1941
- Monarch: George VI
- Prime Minister: Neville Chamberlain; Winston Churchill
- Preceded by: Sir Robert Clive
- Succeeded by: Sir Alvary Gascoigne (1946, as Political Representative)

Personal details
- Born: 6 December 1883
- Died: 16 May 1959 (aged 75)

Sir Robert Leslie Craigie, GCMG, CB, PC (6 December 1883 – 16 May 1959) was the British ambassador in Japan from 1937 to 1941.

== Ambassador ==
In June 1939, on the authority of Prime Minister Neville Chamberlain, Craigie successfully managed to end the Tientsin incident with only limited loss to British prestige. During the course of negotiations with the Japanese, Craigie took advantage of divisions within the Japanese leadership, especially between the prime minister, Hiranuma Kiichirō, who wished for a greater degree of control over the military, and the military itself, which wanted less civilian control.

In July 1939, Craigie took part in negotiations with Japanese Minister of Foreign Affairs, Hachiro Arita, leading to the acceptance of the Craigie–Arita formula by which the British government agreed not to resist Japanese actions in China but did not recognise their legality. In July 1940, following the arrest of several British nationals in Japan, he suggested to the British government to arrest some Japanese nationals in British territory, against whom a case could be made in court, as a move to prove Japanese subversive intentions against Britain.

On the morning of 8 December 1941, he received from Japanese Minister of Foreign Affairs, Shigenori Togo, an official document, stating that negotiations with the US government had failed but without mentioning any war between the Japanese and the British governments.

As one of the Allied diplomats interned in Japan until agreement was reached for their repatriation, he observed the Doolittle Raid on 18 April 1942. Initial reports said that it was a "practice raid", but one staff member (Pleasant) was sure from the start that it was a real raid, and won several bets from sceptics. Craigie said that Japanese staff had been amused at the embassy's air raid precautions because, with the Allies in retreat, the idea of an attack on Tokyo was "laughable". However, the guards showed "considerable excitement and perturbation". Several false alarms followed and, in poorer districts, people rushed into the streets, shouted and gesticulated, lost their normal "iron control" over their emotions and showed a "tendency to panic". The police guards on Allied and neutral missions were doubled to foil xenophobic attacks, but the guard on the German mission was "tripled".

On 30 July 1942, Craigie and staff left Japan on board the Tatsuta Maru, returning to Britain via Lourenço Marques in East Africa (today Maputo, Mozambique).

After returning to Britain in 1942, Craigie suggested that a more conciliatory policy towards the Japanese government would have postponed the outbreak of war in the Far East and would have allowed the British government more time to prepare for such a war.

In 1945, he served briefly as the chairman of the United Nations War Crimes Commission.

== Selected works ==
In a statistical overview derived from writings by and about Robert Craigie, OCLC/WorldCat encompasses roughly 8 works in 10+ publications in 1 language and 200+ library holdings.

- Behind the Japanese mask (1945)
- Ten years in Japan: a contemporary record drawn from the diaries and private and official papers of Joseph C. Grew, United States ambassador to Japan, 1932-1942 by Joseph Grew; foreword by Robert Craigie (1944)

== See also ==
- List of Ambassadors from the United Kingdom to Japan
- Anglo-Japanese relations

== Notes ==
Diplomatic posts
Preceded by Sir Robert Clive	British Ambassador to Japan; 1937–1941	Succeeded by Sir Alvary Gascoigne
