= John Gascoigne (lawyer) =

English lawyer and author

John Gascoigne (fl. 1381) was an English lawyer and author.

== Life ==
Gascoigne was a member of the University of Oxford and became a doctor of canon law. In that capacity, he was called to give evidence before a commission of five bishops, appointed 20 June 1376 to examine controversies between the Master of Arts and the faculty of law at Oxford. In 1381, he appears among the signatories of the judgment of William Berton, chancellor of the university, condemning the doctrine of John Wycliffe touching the Eucharist.

== Works ==
John Pits (De Angliæ Scriptoribus, p. 540), credited him with the authorship of a book Contra Wiclevum. There has also been attributed to him a life of St. Jerome, which is really the work of Thomas Gascoigne, and a lost Lectura de Officio et Potestate Delegati.
