= William Gascoigne (disambiguation) =

William Gascoigne may refer to:

- Sir William Gascoigne (c. 1350–1419), Chief Justice of England
- William Gascoigne (MP for Yorkshire), in 1421 MP for Yorkshire
- William Gascoigne (MP died 1423), MP for Bridgwater
- Sir William Gascoigne (died 1540), MP for Bedfordshire
- William Gascoigne (scientist) (1612–1644), English scientific instrument maker
- Sir William Julius Gascoigne (1844–1926), British Army general
