= Wilber Elliott Wilder =

United States Army general

Wilber Wilder
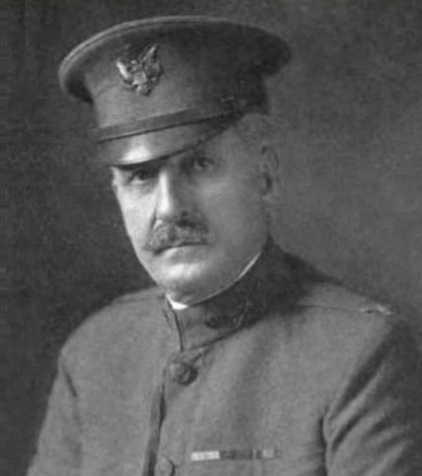
- Wilder in 1918 as commander of the 168th Infantry Brigade, 84th Division.
- Born: August 18, 1857; Atlas, Michigan, U.S.
- Died: January 30, 1952 (aged 94); Governors Island, New York, U.S.
- Burial place: Fairlawn Cemetery, Ridgefield, Connecticut
- Military career
- Allegiance: United States of America
- Branch: United States Army
- Service years: 1877–1920
- Rank: Brigadier General
- Service number: 0-13490
- Unit: 4th Cavalry Regiment
- Commands: 5th Cavalry Regiment; 84th Infantry Division
- Conflicts: Indian Wars; Spanish–American War; Pancho Villa Expedition; World War I
- Awards: Medal of Honor

Wilber Elliott Wilder (August 18, 1857 – January 30, 1952) was a United States Army Brigadier General who was a recipient of the Medal of Honor for rescuing a wounded soldier under heavy fire.

== Education and army career ==
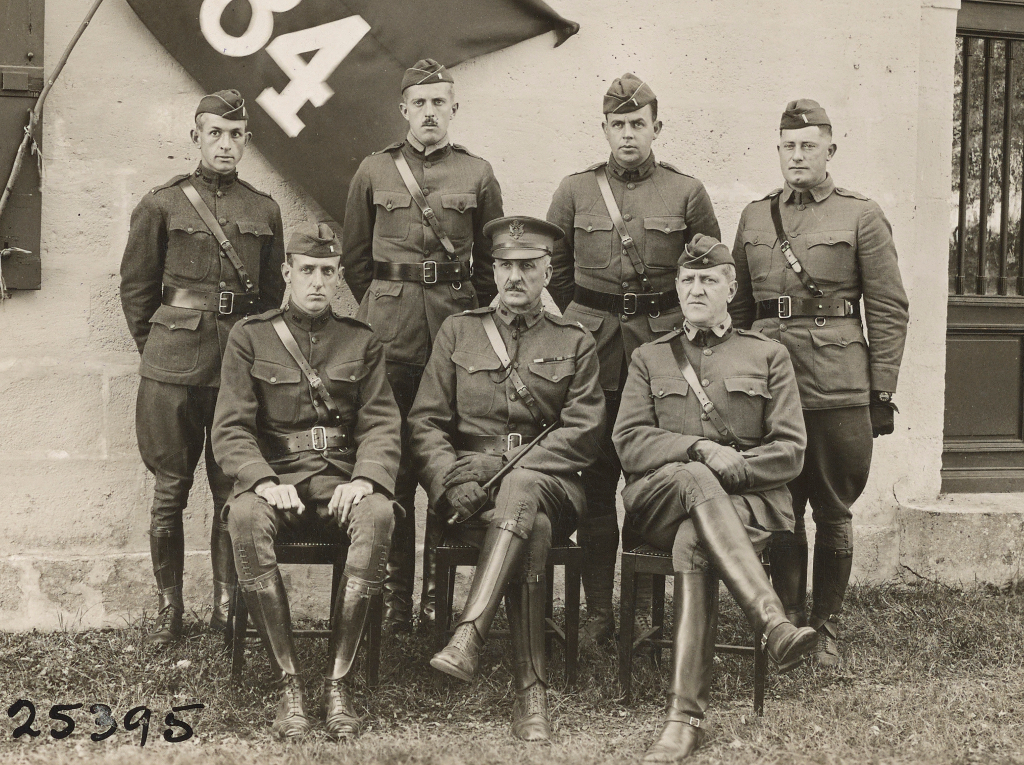
General Wilder with his staff of the 168th Inf. Brigade. His son Wilbur is seated next to him. France, October 1918

Wilber Elliott Wilder graduated from West Point in June, 1877, when he was just short of 21 years old. In 1886, he was a key figure in negotiating the surrender of the Apache chief Geronimo. While an Army Captain, he served as acting superintendent of Yellowstone National Park from March 15, 1899, to June 22, 1899. He also served in the Spanish–American War, the Pancho Villa Expedition, and World War I. From 1913 to 1916, he was the commander of Fort Myer.

== Personal life ==
He married Violet Blair Martin, of the prominent Throop-Martin family of "Willowbrook" near Auburn, New York, on April 16, 1884. The Wilders had two sons and three daughters. After Violet's death, Wilder remarried in 1921 to widow Rose Dimond Phinney Grosvenor and then to Laura Williams Merritt, widow of General Wesley Merritt. He outlived them both and, at the time of his death, was the oldest surviving graduate of the Academy. He died in Governors Island, New York but was residing in Ridgefield, Connecticut at the time.

== Medal of Honor citation ==
Rank and organization: First Lieutenant, 4th U.S. Cavalry. Place and date: At Horseshoe Canyon, N. Mex., 23 April 1882. Entered service at: Detroit, Mich. Birth: Atlas, Mich. Date of issue: 17 August 1896.

Citation: Assisted, under a heavy fire, to rescue a wounded comrade.
