= Jerry (St Leger winner) =

British-bred Thoroughbred racehorse

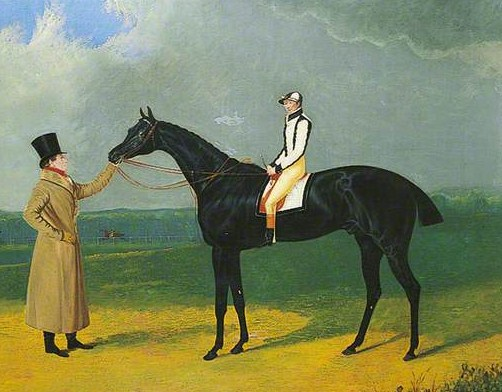
- 'Jerry', Winner of the St Leger, 1824 by John Frederick Herring
- Sire: Smolensko
- Grandsire: Sorcerer
- Dam: Louisa
- Damsire: Orville
- Sex: Stallion
- Foaled: 1821
- Country: United Kingdom
- Colour: Black
- Breeder: Richard Gascoigne
- Owner: Richard Gascoigne; Lord Kelburne
- Trainer: James Croft
- Record: 10: 5-3-0

Major wins
- York St Leger Stakes (1824); XYZ Stakes (1824); Great St Leger Stakes (1824); Catterick Craven Stakes (1827)

Jerry (1821 – 14 May 1851) was a British Thoroughbred racehorse and sire best known for winning the classic St Leger Stakes in 1824. In a racing career which lasted from 1824 until 1827 he ran ten times and won five races. Unraced as a two-year-old, he was beaten on his first appearance in 1824 but then won the York St Leger and the XYZ Stakes at Newcastle before defeating twenty-two opponents in the St Leger at Doncaster. Jerry missed the entire 1825 season and showed little form in 1826, but won twice as a six-year-old in 1827. He was retired to stud, where he proved to be a successful sire of winners.

== Background ==
Jerry was a black horse bred in Yorkshire by his owner Richard Gascoigne. According to a description written in 1827, he stood 15.3 hands high and possessed "immense muscular power".

Jerry was one of two classic winners sired by the 1813 Epsom Derby winner Smolensko, the other being the Oaks winner Gulnare. Jerry was the third of fifteen foals produced by Gascoigne's mare Louisa between 1819 and 1837. Her dam Thomasina was a half-sister of the classic winners Symmetry (St Leger) and Theophania (Oaks).

Gascoigne sent his colt into training with James Croft at East Wilton near Middleham.

== Racing career ==
=== 1824: three-year-old season ===
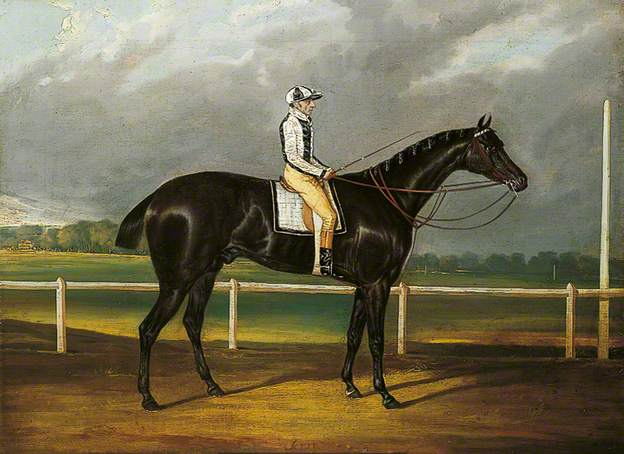
'Jerry', Winner of the St Leger by an unknown artist

Jerry did not run as a two-year-old and began his racing career on 22 April 1824 at Catterick Bridge Racecourse in Yorkshire. He started at odds of 2/1 for the two mile race and finished second of the five runners behind Lord Sligo's colt Canteen. Jerry next appeared at York Racecourse on 24 May when he contested a "St Leger Stakes". The success of the St Leger at Doncaster had led other major courses, including York and Newmarket to use the name for their own long distance races for three-year-olds; the original race was renamed the "Great St Leger" for several years to distinguish itself from the imitators. Ridden by H. Edwards, he was made the 5/2 second favourite and recorded his first win by beating Major Cunninghame's Outcry colt and five others, including the favourite Streatham.

In July, Jerry was sent north to compete at Newcastle Racecourse in Northumberland and won the two mile XYZ Stakes from a single opponent.

Nineteen colts and four fillies were attracted to Doncaster Racecourse on 20 September for the forty-ninth running of the Great St Leger. Jerry was ridden by Ben Smith and started the 9/1 third favourite behind Streatham and Brutandorf. Jerry won the race from Canteen. Shortly after his win in the St Leger, Jerry was sold for 2,000 guineas to Lord Kelburne.

=== 1826: five-year-old season ===
Jerry missed the entire 1825 season as a result of health problems and failed to reproduce his best form as a five-year-old. He did not reappear in public until 16 May 1826 when he finished unplaced behind the mare Fleur-de-Lis in the two mile York Gold Cup. Two years after his St Leger win, Jerry returned to Doncaster in autumn and produced a "very bad" performance to be last of the five runners behind Fleur-de-Lis in the Doncaster Cup. Jerry's third and final run of the year came on 4 October, when he finished second to Lord Kennedy's horse Bedlamite in the Richmond Gold Cup.

=== 1827: six-year-old season ===
Three years after his debut, Jerry returned to Catterick Bridge Racecourse for the ten furlong Craven Stakes in April 1827. Ridden by Edwards, he started at odds of 9/2 against eight opponents and recorded his first success in thirty months as he won from the Duke of Leeds' colt Sirius. On 23 May at York he ran second to Fleur-de-Lis in the Constitution Stakes, finishing ahead of Humphrey Clinker and Sirius. Jerry next appeared at York in August when he was required to concede eleven pounds to the 1826 St Leger winner Tarrare in a two mile sweepstakes. Jerry, who started at odds of 7/2, took an early lead and set a very strong pace. He was challenged and overtaken by Tarrare in the straight but rallied to defeat the younger horse by half a length after a "very severe race" and end his racing career with a win.

== Stud career ==
Jerry began his stud career at Boroughbridge in Yorkshire at a covering fee of 10 sovereigns. For the 1831 season, Lord Kelburne moved his stallion to Scotland where he stood at Hawkhead near Paisley at a slightly increased fee of 11 sovereigns, but a year later Jerry was back in Yorkshire and standing at 20 sovereigns. By 1838 he was at Mr Edwards' stud at Newmarket and it was reported that his stock were selling for high prices. Three years later he had been moved to the Duke of Grafton's stud at Euston Hall, near Thetford and was standing at a reduced fee of 12 guineas. Jerry died on 14 May 1851 at Middleham under the ownership of the Earl of Glasgow.

Jerry's only classic winner was Clearwell, a grey colt who won the 2000 Guineas in 1833. Jerry had some success as a sire of sires: his son Tomboy sired the St Leger winner Nutwith and was the damsire of the 1000 Guineas winner Manganese, later a successful broodmare. Another of Jerry's sons was Jericho, a successful racehorse who sired the 2000 Guineas winner The Promised Land. Jerry's last notable offspring were foaled in 1845.

== Sire line tree ==
- Jerry
  - Tomboy
    - Nutwith
      - Knight of Kars
        - The Colonel
        - New Oswestry
    - Trueboy
  - Clearwell
  - Jeremy Diddler
  - Jericho
    - The Promised Land

== Pedigree ==
Pedigree of Jerry (GB), black stallion, 1821
Sire Smolensko (GB) 1810	Sorcerer; 1796	Trumpator	Conductor
Sire Smolensko (GB) 1810	Sorcerer; 1796	Trumpator	Brunette
Sire Smolensko (GB) 1810	Sorcerer; 1796	Young Giantess	Diomed
Sire Smolensko (GB) 1810	Sorcerer; 1796	Young Giantess	Giantess
Sire Smolensko (GB) 1810	Wowski; 1797	Mentor	Justice
Sire Smolensko (GB) 1810	Wowski; 1797	Mentor	Shakespeare mare
Sire Smolensko (GB) 1810	Wowski; 1797	Maria	Herod
Sire Smolensko (GB) 1810	Wowski; 1797	Maria	Lisette
Dam Louisa (GB) 1813	Orville; 1799	Beningbrough	King Fergus
Dam Louisa (GB) 1813	Orville; 1799	Beningbrough	Fenwick's Herod mare
Dam Louisa (GB) 1813	Orville; 1799	Evelina	Highflyer
Dam Louisa (GB) 1813	Orville; 1799	Evelina	Termagant
Dam Louisa (GB) 1813	Thomasina; 1804	Timothy	Delpini
Dam Louisa (GB) 1813	Thomasina; 1804	Timothy	Cora
Dam Louisa (GB) 1813	Thomasina; 1804	Violet	Shark
Dam Louisa (GB) 1813	Thomasina; 1804	Violet	Syphon mare (Family:15)
