= Douglas Galton =

British engineer

Sir Douglas Strutt Galton
- Born: 2 July 1822; Hadzor House, Worcestershire, England
- Died: 18 March 1899 (aged 76)
- Education: Rugby School
- Spouse: Mary Anne Nicholson of Waverley Abbey
- Parent(s): Isabelle Strutt (daughter of Joseph Strutt) & John Howard Galton
- Engineering career
- Discipline: Civil
- Institutions: Institution of Civil Engineers (president); Royal Society of Edinburgh (Fellow)

Sir Douglas Strutt Galton KCB MStJ FRS (2 July 1822 – 18 March 1899) was a British engineer. He became a captain in the Royal Engineers and Secretary to the Railway Department, Board of Trade. In 1866 he was a member of the Royal Commission on Railways. From 1869 to 1875 he was Directory of Public Works and Buildings.

== Education and early life ==
His father was John Howard Galton of Hadzor House, Worcestershire, the son of Samuel "John" Galton. His mother was Isabelle Strutt, the daughter of Joseph Strutt, mayor of Derby. He was a cousin of the scientist Francis Galton. Douglas was born in Spring Hill, near Birmingham. He was educated in Birmingham, in Geneva and at Rugby School under Thomas Arnold. He graduated with distinction from the Royal Military Academy, Woolwich, and was commissioned second lieutenant in the Royal Engineers on 18 December 1840.

== Career ==
Galton inherited Himbleton Manor, near Droitwich, probably in the 1850s. He became a captain in the Royal Engineers and Secretary to the Railway Department, Board of Trade.

The Galton family were evidently regular visitors to nearby Hadzor Hall, near Droitwich, the seat of Theodore Howard Galton. Galton and Florence Nightingale worked together closely for many years on safer design for hospitals and barracks. She succeeded in getting him appointed assistant under secretary at the War Office, in 1862, after the death of Sidney Herbert, the reforming war secretary with whom they had both worked after the Crimean War, and whom he so greatly admired. He resigned from that position in 1868 to become director of Public Works and Buildings 1869 to 1875.

In 1866, he was a member of the Royal Commission on Railways. He was also member of the Cubic Space Committee established in 1866 to make recommendations to Parliament on workhouse infirmaries. He later was a member of the Metropolitan Asylums Board which administered the new hospitals set up to replace the old workhouse infirmaries. During the 1870-1871 Franco-Prussian War, he served on the National Aid Society, which sent out surgeons and relief supplies. In 1891 he chaired the organizing committee for the 7th International Congress of Hygiene and Demography, held in London, with the prince of Wales as chair. In 1895, he was elected president of the British Association for the Advancement of Science.

Galton was a favourite Nightingale collaborator. She routinely sent him plans of hospitals and nurses' homes she had been asked to criticize, and he deferred to her utterly on nursing matters, to facilitate more efficient nursing and better conditions for nurses. They were both committed to the then new "pavilion" mode of construction, which made Britain a world leader in hospital safety. She stressed the importance of the materials for hospital walls, floors, sinks, appliances and finishes to make them more impervious to disease, and he obliged by searching out the best examples to recommend. He designed the Herbert Hospital, Woolwich, which became the model military hospital for hospital safety, visited by architects, engineers and hospital reformers from around the world. It still stands, now with a historic designation, radically rebuilt as luxury apartments, the Royal Herbert Pavilions.

Eight volumes of correspondence between Galton and Nightingale are at the British Library. There is considerable published correspondence with Florence Nightingale in Florence Nightingale and Hospital Reform. Nightingale kept in touch with him to his death in 1899—there are touching letters to him in his last months, and inquiries to his wife, Marianne, Nightingale’s cousin, in a collection held at Leeds Lotherton. Close friends wrote Nightingale with condolences on his loss.

== Family ==
At Farnham on 26 August 1851 he married Marianne Nicholson (sometimes seen as Mary Anne) of Waverley Abbey, who was Florence Nightingale's cousin. They had two daughters. The younger daughter Evelyne Isabella married Count Camillo Fenzi at Hadzor, Worcestershire on 21 July 1875 but he reportedly died as a result of a shooting accident aged only 30. In 1898 she remarried to Leonard D. Cunliffe, London financier, Governor of the Bank of England, President of the Hudson's Bay Company and one of the major investors in the Harrods department stores. The older daughter was Laura Gwendolyne (or Gwendolen) who was born around 1860 and died on 10 July 1949. She married Colonel Frederick Richard Trench Gascoigne in February 1892. Their home was at Lotherton, Leeds.

They had one son, born in 1861, named Herbert Nightingale Douglas, after Sidney Herbert and Florence Nightingale, who became his godmother. The infant died the following year.

== Honours ==
Galton was elected a Fellow of the Royal Society in 1859. He was made an officer of the Légion d'honneur and a knight of grace of the order of Knights of St John of Jerusalem in 1889. He also received the Turkish order of the Mejidiye. Oxford University made him an honorary DCL in 1875, and both Durham and Montreal universities made him an honorary LLD. He was a member of the Institution of Electrical Engineers, serving on their council from 1888 to 1890, and was vice-president of the Institution of Mechanical Engineers. In 1891 he was chairman of the executive committee of the International Congress of Hygiene and Demography in London. In 1894 the Institution of Civil Engineers made him an honorary member. Galton was invested as a Knight Commander of the Order of the Bath, civil division at Queen Victoria's jubilee in 1887.

Galton is remembered in a Warwickshire church near his country home: "The 15th century glass in this window was restored and dedicated to the glory of God by the parishioners of Himbleton in dear memory of Captain Sir Douglas Galton, KCB, an earnest and true-hearted seeker after God. A.D. 1901."

== Collections ==
University College London Special Collections holds letters from Galton to Henry Lucas discussing the committee of University College Hospital.

== Works ==
- Report to the Right Hon the Earl de Grey and Ripon, Secretary of State for War, Descriptive of the Herbert Hospital at Woolwich. London: Eyre & Spottiswoode 1865.
- An Address on the General Principles which should be observed in the Construction of Hospitals. To the British Medical Association. London: Macmillan 1869.
- Observations on the Construction of Healthy Dwellings, namely, Houses, Hospitals, Barracks, Asylums, etc. Oxford: Clarendon 1880.
- Healthy Hospitals: Observations on Some Points connected with Hospital Construction. Oxford: Clarendon 1893.
- "Hospitals, Administration of," and "Hospitals, Construction of," in Richard Quain, A Dictionary of Medicine. London: Longmans, Green 1894.
