= Richard Philip Oliver =

Irish landowner

Richard Oliver Gascoigne

High Sheriff of Yorkshire
- In office 1816–1817
- Preceded by: William Garforth
- Succeeded by: Sir William Milner, Bt

Personal details
- Born: Richard Philip Oliver; 1763
- Died: 14 April 1843 (aged 79–80)
- Spouse: Mary Turner (m. 1804; died 1819)
- Children: 4
- Parent(s): Silver Oliver; Isabella Sarah Newman Oliver

Richard Philip Oliver (1763 – 14 April 1843), later known as Richard Oliver Gascoigne, was an Irish landowner at Castle Oliver in County Limerick and Parlington Hall in Yorkshire.

== Early life ==
He was the eldest surviving son of Isabella Sarah (née Newman) Oliver and Silver Oliver of Castle Oliver in County Limerick. His father sat in the Irish House of Commons for County Limerick.

His paternal grandparents were Jane Katherine (née Silver) Oliver and Robert Oliver, who also sat in the Irish House of Commons.

== Career ==
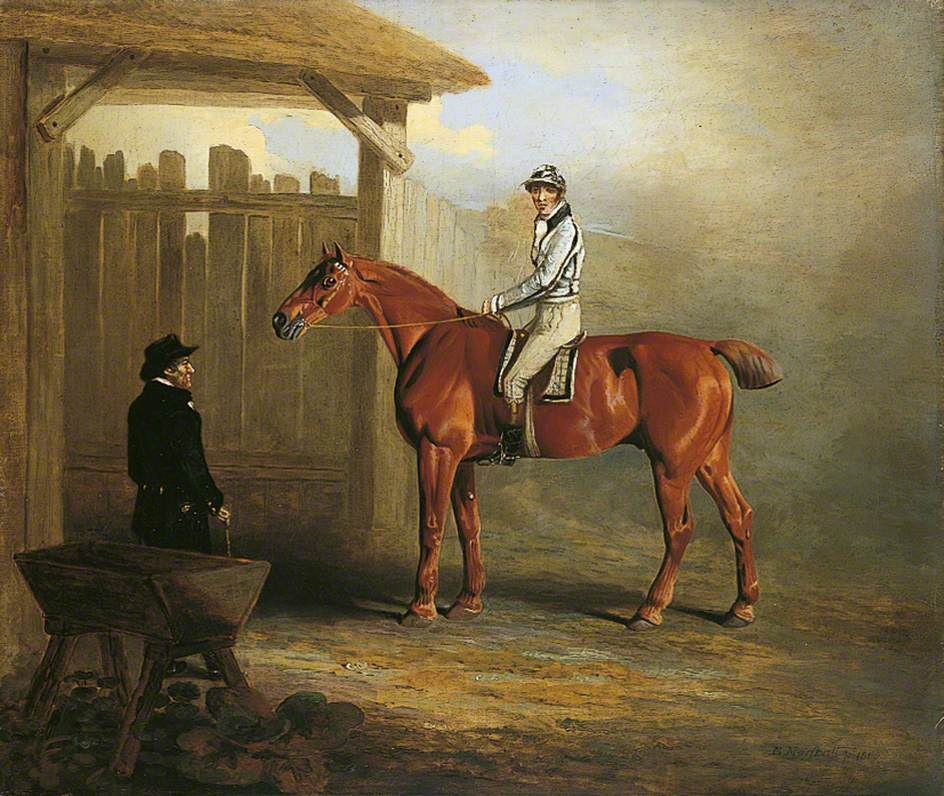
Soothsayer, British school, c. 1811

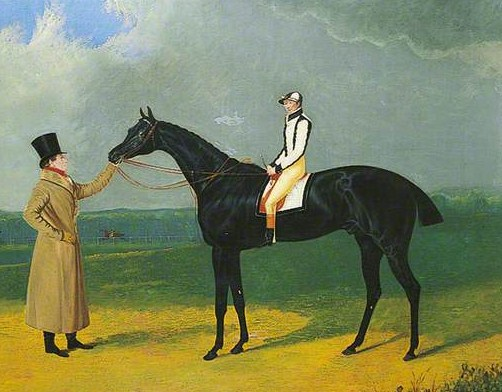
Jerry, winner of the St Leger, 1824 by John Frederick Herring

He served as High Sheriff of Yorkshire in 1816.

Gascoigne lived at Parlington Hall in Yorkshire for 33 years. During his time there, he completed several improvements, including construction of the Dark Arch built between 1813 and 1814, a tunnel of around 80 yards in a sweeping curve along the line of Parlington Lane, as well as the Light Arch. He invested in the agricultural interests at Parlington, developing mineral assets on the estate, particularly coal mining. Gascoigne also established a racing team there. He won (along with Thomas Foley, 3rd Baron Foley) the St Leger in 1811 with Soothsayer, and again in 1824 (with Lord Kelburne) with a famous horse called Jerry before retiring from the turf around 1835.

== Personal life ==
On 3 May 1804, he was married by special licence to Mary Turner (1782–1819) at Parlington Hall. Mary was the daughter of Sir Charles Turner, 1st Baronet, of Kirkleatham and step-daughter of Sir Thomas Gascoigne, 8th Baronet, upon whose death Richard and Mary inherited a life interest in the estates following the death of Mary's step brother and Gascoigne heir Tom in a hunting accident in October 1809. In accordance with the will they assumed the name and arms of Gascoigne in 1811. Together, they were the parents of four children:

- Thomas Oliver Gascoigne (1806–1842), who died of a palsy while in London.
- Richard Silver Oliver Gascoigne (1808–1842), who died on Christmas Day 1842.
- Mary Isabella Oliver Gascoigne (1810–1891), who married Colonel Frederick Charles Trench (later Trench-Gascoigne) in 1850; she was the mother of Col. F. R. T. Trench-Gascoigne.
- Elizabeth Oliver Gascoigne (1812–1893), who married Frederick Mason Trench, 2nd Baron Ashtown in 1852.

Mary died in 1819, aged 36, and was buried at Barwick in Elmet. Gascoigne died on 14 April 1843, aged 80, and was buried at Aberford. Their two surviving daughters inherited the Gascoigne estates.
