= Parlington Hall =

Country house in West Yorkshire, England

Coordinates: 53.81899°N 1.3597°W

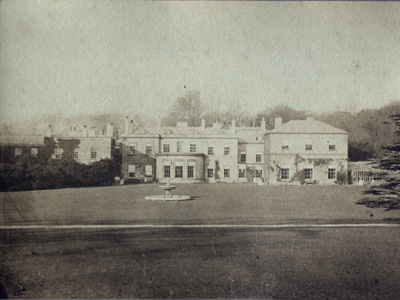
South elevation of Parlington Hall around the 1880s

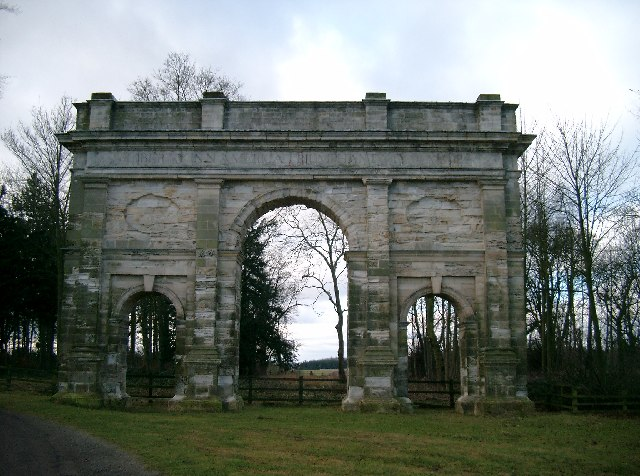
The Triumphal Arch

Parlington Hall was the seat of the Gascoigne family, Aberford near Leeds in West Yorkshire, England.

== History ==
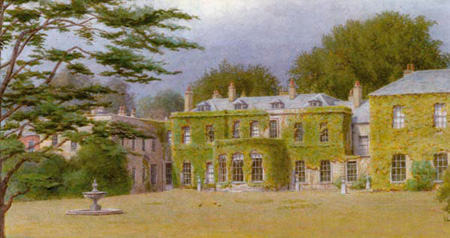
Parlington Hall (1911) by Philip Norman

The Parlington estate was acquired by the Gascoignes from the Wentworth family in 1546. The hall was modified by successive family members including Sir Edward Gascoigne (early eighteenth century), his son Sir Thomas Gascoigne, the last baronet (late eighteenth century), Richard Oliver-Gascoigne (early nineteenth century) and lastly Isabella and her husband Frederick in the mid- and late nineteenth century.

The house, built in a mixture of architectural styles and materials set in landscaped gardens was abandoned in 1905, after which incremental demolition took place until the late 1950s. Most of what can be seen in old photographs is later than the seventeenth century. Pevsner (1967) does not mention the house implying that nothing substantial survived by that date.

Sir Thomas Gascoigne, 8th and last Baronet, succeeded his brother in 1762. Sir Thomas was M.P. for Thirsk from 1780 to 1784, for Malton in 1784 and for Arundel in 1795. He was a keen breeder and trainer of horses and with Sir Thomas Stapleton won the St Leger Stakes in 1778 with Hollandoise and the same race twenty years later with his home-bred colt Symmetry. He supported the cause of American independence and commissioned a triumphal arch celebrating the American victory in the War of Independence which stands at the west end of the avenue leading to the estate. The architect was Thomas Leverton. The inscription is 'LIBERTY IN N.AMERICA TRIUMPHANT.MDCCLXXXIII'. Pevsner describes the lettering as 'very fine'.

The death in February 1810 of Sir Thomas Gascoigne the last baronet, aged 65 came just a few months after his heir and only child Tom had pre-deceased him as a result of an accident whilst hunting. Sir Thomas had a new will prepared and his step-daughter, Mary (second child of Sir Charles Turner and Mary Turner) benefitted with her husband Richard Oliver in a lifetime interest in the estates, a proviso being that the family took on the name of Gascoigne and that they had issue. Thereafter Richard Oliver-Gascoigne, presided over the properties. Richard continued the horse-racing tradition of the estate, winning the St Leger in 1811 with Soothsayer and in 1824 with Jerry. He was responsible for building the "Dark Arch" in 1813, an extant shallow, stone-lined road tunnel which allowed traffic to pass by on Parlington Lane without disturbing the occupants of the house. He was High Sheriff of Yorkshire in 1816–17. Mary died in 1819 having had four children, two sons and two daughters. Both sons pre-deceased Richard Oliver-Gascoigne, and the daughters Isabella and Elizabeth inherited all his estates in 1843.

Isabella and Elizabeth, two deeply creative women, commissioned the building of schools, almshouses and churches in the region, and made huge improvements to their estates and the living conditions of their tenantry. The sisters personally fabricated stained glass windows for their various projects. One of these survives in the park at Parlington (in which building?). Isabella's particular interest was wood-turning and she installed at least three lathes in her own workshop at Parlington, and wrote an authoritative book on the subject, "The Art of Wood-Turning" which she published under a male pseudonym. It is a respected source of information on the subject. In 1850, Isabella married Colonel Frederick Charles Trench of Woodlawn, County Galway, Ireland. In 1852, Elizabeth married Frederick's cousin Frederick Mason Trench, 2nd Baron Ashtown, head of the Trench family. Jointly the sisters had already built Castle Oliver on their father's estate in Limerick, Ireland. Elizabeth and her husband lived at Castle Oliver, while Isabella and her husband continued to reside at Parlington Hall until her death in 1891.

Following the death of Frederick Charles Trench in June 1905 Parlington Hall was abandoned. His son Col. Frederick Richard Thomas Trench-Gascoigne was established at another family residence, Lotherton Hall, to the east of the nearby village Aberford, which he had inherited on the death of his aunt, Elizabeth. After 1905, much of the contents and smaller architectural features of Parlington were transferred to Lotherton, which lies on the B1217 road towards Towton and Sherburn-in-Elmet. It is open to the public, and contains Gascoigne family memorabilia.

== Listed buildings ==
The Parlington estate contains a number of features, including the grade II* listed Triumphal Arch, designed by Thomas Leverton and built around the end of the 18th century, which is unique in commemorating the victory of the American colonialists over the British in the American War of Independence. An inscription on both faces of the arch reads, "Liberty in N. America Triumphant MDCCLXXXIII"; a tunnel known locally as the "Dark Arch", which was built to shield the inhabitants of the hall from traffic passing along Parlington Lane, is still intact almost two hundred years later; an underground icehouse is also intact — a testament to Georgian brick construction.
