= Castle Oliver =

Victorian castle-style building in County Limerick, Ireland

Coordinates: 52.326619°N 8.484117°W

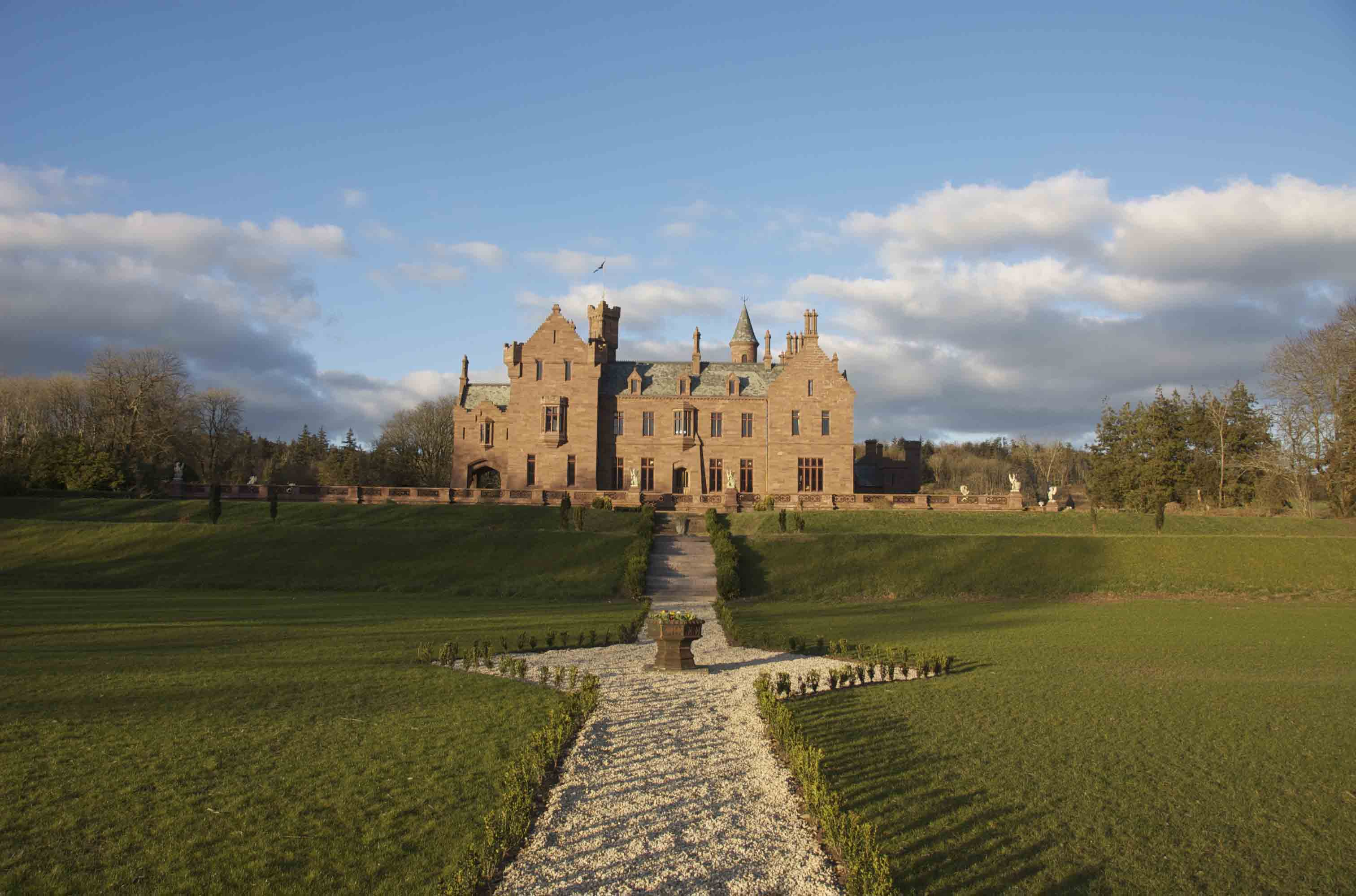
Castle Oliver south facade, porte cochere visible on left

Castle Oliver (also Clonodfoy) is a Victorian castle-style country house in the southern part of County Limerick, Ireland. Built for entertaining rather than for defence, it has a ballroom, drawing room, library, morning room, dining room and hall which feature hand-painted ceilings, decorated ornamental corbels, superbly executed stained glass windows and stencil work. The castle stands on massive terraces and has a commanding view over much of its former 20,000-acre (81 km^{2}) estate. The castle has Ireland's largest wine cellar, said to hold approximately 55,000 bottles.

== History ==
=== Background ===
The lands where the castle stands were settled in about 1658 by Capt. Robert Oliver, one of Oliver Cromwell's soldiers. The present castle replaced the former Castle Oliver, which stood a thousand yards to the south-west and was the birthplace of Eliza Oliver, mother of the notorious Lola Montez, who became the lover and favourite of King Ludwig I of Bavaria.

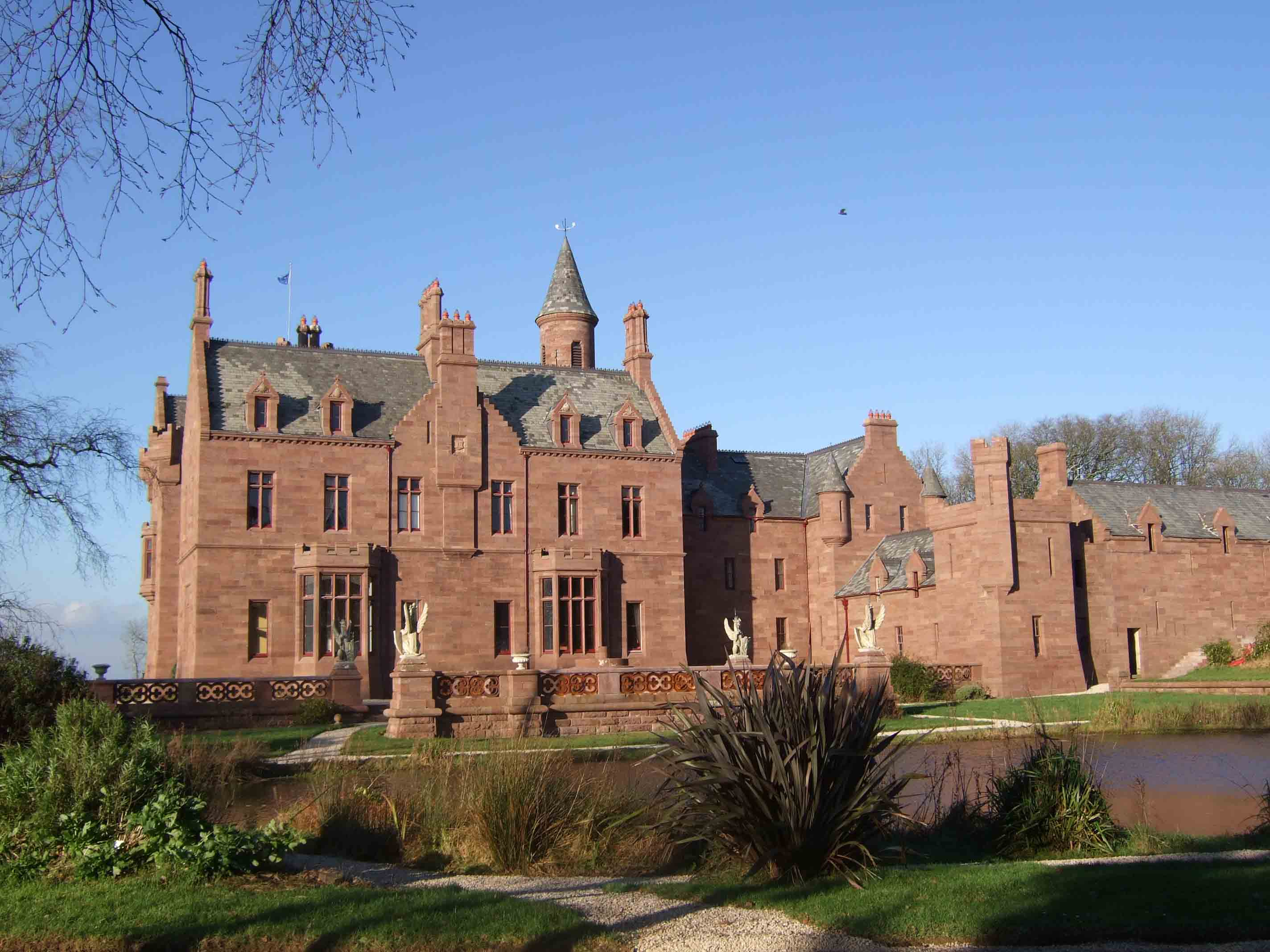
Castle Oliver east facade with ballroom and dining room in main block, servants' wing and coach house on right

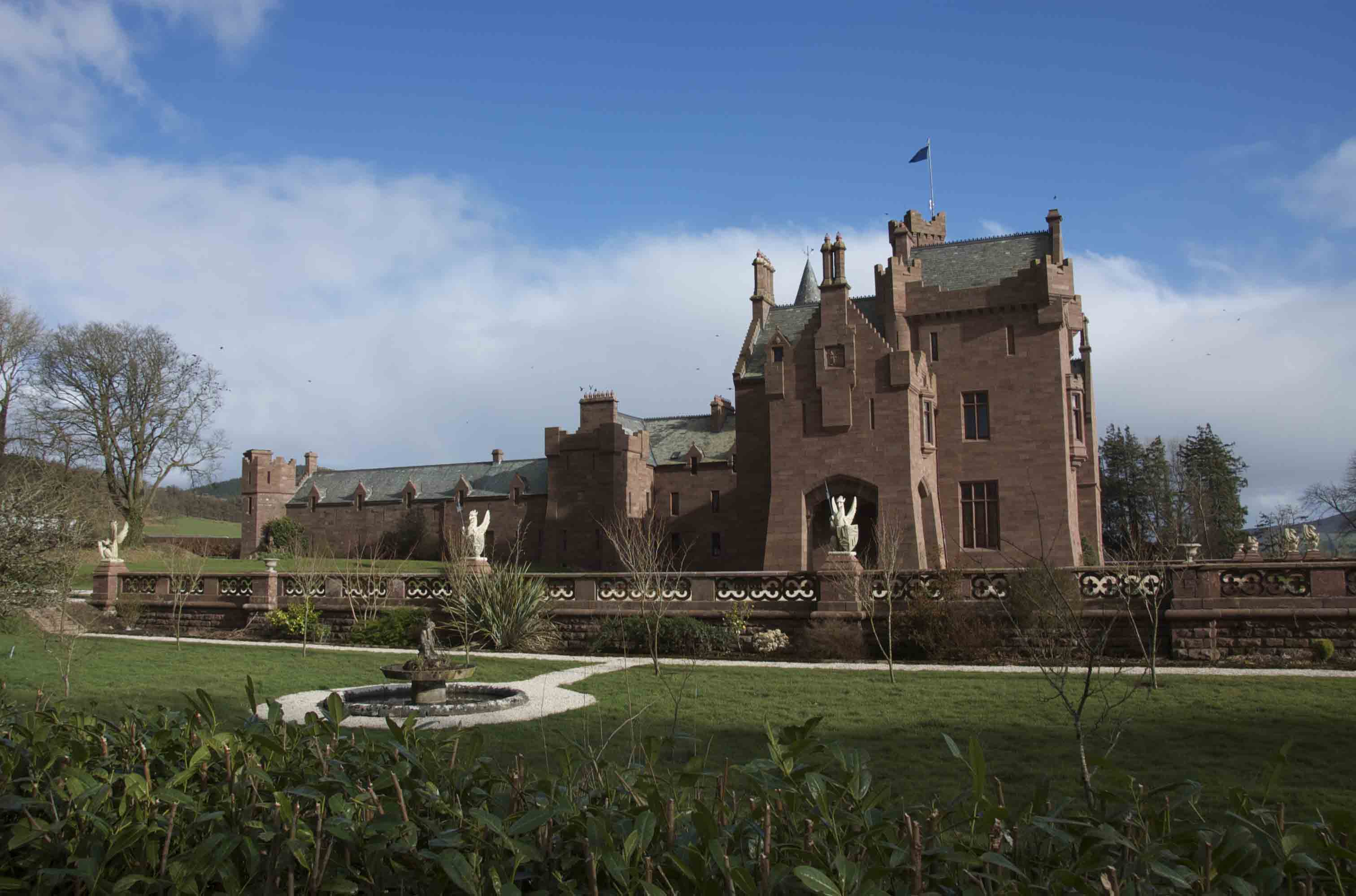
Castle Oliver west, stables wing on left

The castle was for many years known as Clonodfoy, a contraction of an earlier Irish place name: Cloch an Otbhaidhigh, meaning 'the stone structure of Otway', Otway being an Anglo-Norman family name.

Capt. Robert Oliver's descendant Richard Oliver married a Yorkshire heiress through whom he inherited substantial wealth and property in West Yorkshire and moved away to live in Parlington Hall near Leeds, leaving Castle Oliver to deteriorate in the hands of a bailiff. Their daughters, Mary Isabella and Elizabeth Oliver Gascoigne, both married members of the Trench family of Woodlawn, Galway. The younger sister, Elizabeth, married Frederic Mason Trench, 2nd Baron Ashtown in 1852. The sisters were highly accomplished artisans, designing and executing both the stained glass work and verre eglomise (back painted glass panels) which ornamented the ballroom fireplace. Much of their work has survived. The elder sister, Mary Isabella, was a highly skilled wood-turner who published (under a male pseudonym) an authoritative book on the subject, "The Art of Wood-Turning", still a respected source of information on the subject.

=== The building ===
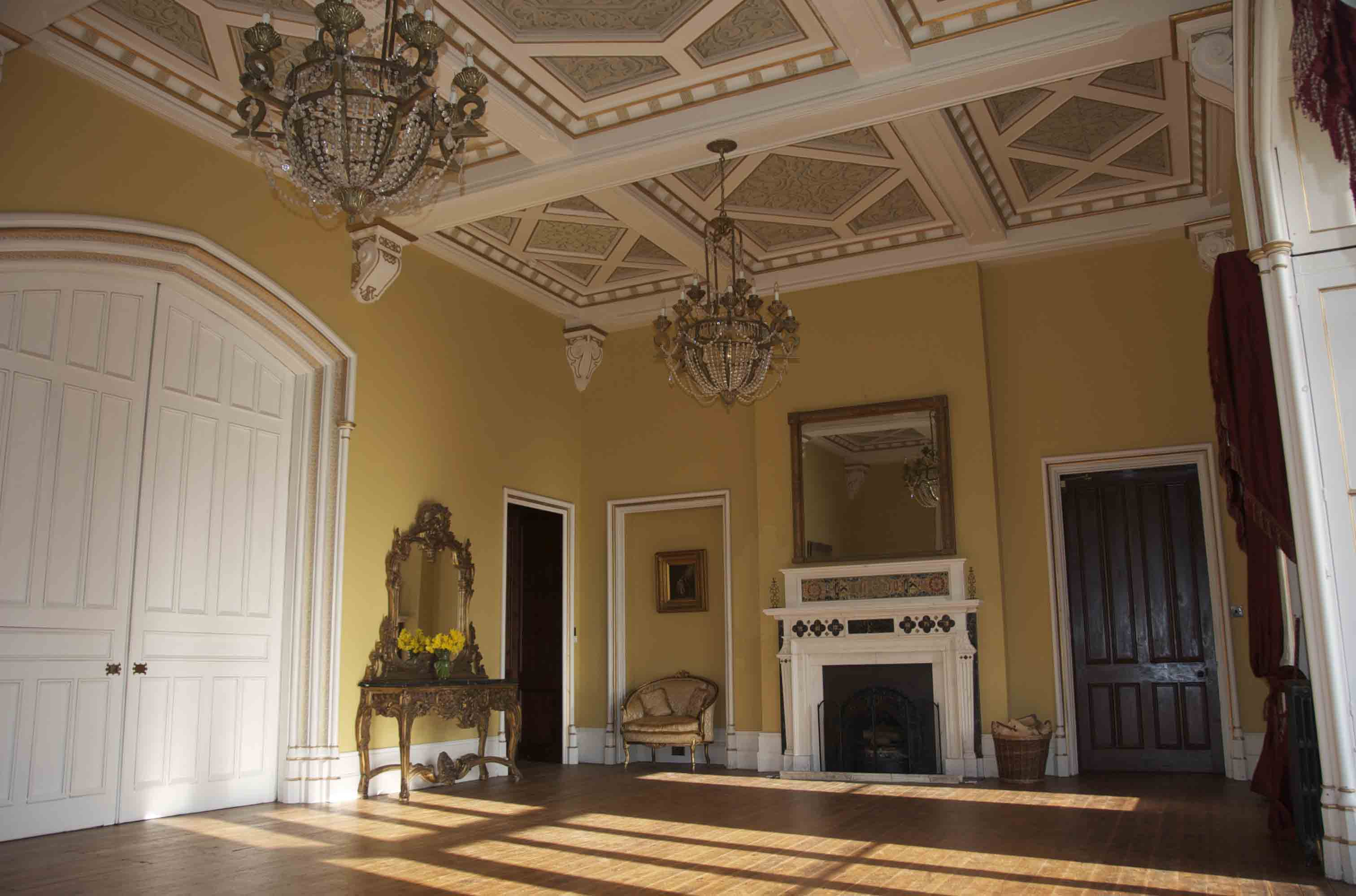
Ballroom with verre eglomise fireplace, Gothic-arched doors connect to drawing room

The sisters commissioned the present castle in 1845. It was designed by the York architect George Fowler Jones in the Scottish Baronial style and built in a local pink sandstone, quarried on the estate. Fowler Jones had designed several substantial commissions for the sisters in the north of England, including almshouses and churches. Whilst Mary Isabella and her husband made their home in the Yorkshire seat of the Gascoignes (Parlington Hall), Elizabeth and her husband occupied Castle Oliver. The house was later inherited by Elizabeth's step-grandson, the Honourable William Cosby Trench.

The last member of the Trench family to live at Castle Oliver, Mrs Lynn Trench, sold the property to the racing driver Billy Coleman in 1978. After that the castle changed hands several times, eventually becoming the property of a local bank, who broke up the remaining land, farm and lodges into separate lots. The castle itself failed to find a buyer and languished into decay, falling prey to vandals and thieves. It appeared in the book "Vanishing Houses of Ireland", published by the Irish Georgian Society.

=== New ownership (1988-) ===
In 1988 it was purchased by Damian Haughton, who according to the subsequent owner, put a halt to most of the worst leaks in the roof. In 1998 it was purchased by Nicholas Browne, who continued the restoration work and transformed it back into a habitable residence. In 2006 Castle Oliver was purchased by Declan and Emma Cormack from County Antrim. They completed high-grade restoration work, restoring many of the original rooms and features, such as the Library, St Patrick's stained glass window, wooden panelling, cornices and many fireplaces. They made the Castle Oliver their home with their three children Michael, Shane and Ciara Cormack. A few years later they bought another castle in County Antrim. In 2015 the Cormack’s sold it to the Ralph family from Australia to use as a home for "several months of the year".

From May to September 2014, Castle Oliver was opened to the public in conjunction with "Limerick City of Culture" for house tours.
