= List of UK literary agencies =

This is a list of the major UK literary agencies, by order of the year of their establishment, including selected notable clients.

== Literary agencies ==
Year founded	Agency	Management	Notable clients	Website	Notes
1875	A P Watt	Caradoc King (chairman and joint managing director), Derek Johns (joint managing director)	Philip Pullman	www.apwatt.co.uk www.unitedagents.co.uk/ap-watt	Oldest literary agency in the world. In December 2012, A P Watt joined the United Agents Partnership.
1898 (US)	WME (UK)	Simon Trewin (head of UK Literary Division)		www.wmeagency.com	Formerly William Morris Endeavor. The largest talent agency in the world, having been created in 2009 by the merger of the William Morris Agency and the Endeavor Agency.
1899	Curtis Brown	Jonathan Lloyd (chief executive), Jonny Geller (managing director, books division)	Bonnie Garmus, Bono, Monica Ali, John Le Carré, Daphne du Maurier	curtisbrown.co.uk	
1919	AM Heath	Bill Hamilton (managing director)	Hilary Mantel, George Orwell (estate)	www.amheath.com	Founded in 1919 by Audrey Heath and Alice May Spinks.
1924	Peters Fraser + Dunlop (PFD)	Caroline Michel (chief executive)	Simon Schama, Jeanette Winterson, C. S. Forester (estate)	www.petersfraserdunlop.com	Part of the Rights House Group, which was established in 2010, PFD is the result of a 1989 merger between the A. D. Peters Agency and the Fraser and Dunlop Agency.
1932	Eric Glass Ltd			ericglass.agency	Founded in 1932 by Eric Glass.
1935	David Higham Associates	Anthony Goff (managing director)	J. M. Coetzee, Roald Dahl (estate), Stephen Fry, Eric Hobsbawm, Jacqueline Wilson, Rosemary Sutcliff	www.davidhigham.co.uk	Originally Pearn, Pollinger & Higham; David Higham Associates since 1956.
1956	Johnson & Alcock	Michael Alcock, Andrew Hewson	Candace Allen, Beryl Bainbridge (estate), Lawrence Scott, D. M. Thomas	www.johnsonandalcock.co.uk	Created in 2003 by the merger of Michael Alcock Management and the John Johnson Agency.
1961	Roger Hancock Ltd	Lucy Hancock (director)	Tony Hancock, Graeme Garden, Bill Oddie, Annie Leake		Founded in 1961 by Roger Hancock.
1962	Sheil Land Associates	Sonia Land (chief executive)	Peter Ackroyd, Melvyn Bragg, Susan Hill, Patrick O’Brian (estate)	www.sheilland.co.uk	Based in London, UK. Incorporates Richard Scott Simon Ltd (1971) and Christy & Moore Ltd (1912). Overseas associates: Georges Borchardt, Inc. (USA).
1963	Greene & Heaton	Carol Heaton	Michael Frayn, Richard Reed	www.greeneheaton.co.uk	Founded by Elaine Greene, who was later joined by Carol Heaton.
1967	Rogers, Coleridge & White	Gill Coleridge (chairman), Peter Straus (managing director)	David Aaronovitch, Yassmin Abdel-Magied, Aida Edemariam, Abdulrazak Gurnah, Nick Hornby, Kazuo Ishiguro, James Kelman, Ian McEwan, Caryl Phillips, Zadie Smith, Meera Syal, Donna Tartt	www.rcwlitagency.com	Founded as Deborah Rogers Ltd by Deborah Rogers who was soon joined by Pat White and in 1988 by Gill Coleridge when Rogers, Coleridge & White was formed. Representing adult fiction and non-fiction, and children's and YA.
1970	Watson, Little Ltd	James Wills (managing director)	Lynne Reid Banks, D. J. Enright, Margaret Mahy, James Wong, Evie Wyld	www.watsonlittle.com	Founded by Sheila Watson and Mandy Little. Based in London, UK.
1973 (US)	Janklow & Nesbit (UK)	Will Francis (Managing Director, London office)	Alan Rusbridger, Rebecca Stott	www.janklowandnesbit.co.uk	London office opened in 2000.
1974	Independent Talent Group	Duncan Heath (co-chairman), Sally Long-Innes (co-chair and managing director),		www.independenttalent.com	Founded as Duncan Heath & Associates, which was bought by ICM in 1985. In 1991, ICM merged Duncan Heath & Associates with its UK office and, in 2002, a management buyout took place. The agency was renamed Independent Talent in August 2007.
1974	MBA	Diana Tyler (joint managing director), Laura Longrigg (joint managing director)		www.mbalit.co.uk	Represents writers in all media, including books, and scripts for film, television, radio and theatre.
1976	Ed Victor Literary Agency	Ed Victor (executive chairman), Sophie Hicks (joint managing director), Margaret Phillips (joint managing director)		www.edvictor.com	Acquired by Curtis Brown in 2017.
1976	Aitken Alexander Associates	Gillon Aitken (chairman), Clare Alexander (joint managing director), Sally Riley (joint managing director)		www.aitkenalexander.co.uk	Originally Gillon Aitken Associates, and operated for a time as Aitken & Stone.
1982	Blake Friedmann	Julian Friedmann (chairman, director), Isobel Dixon (managing director)		www.blakefriedmann.co.uk	Created by the merger of Julian Friedmann Literary Agency and the Carole Blake Literary Agency, founded in 1976 and 1977 respectively, the agency was restructured following the death in 2017 of co-founder Carole Blake.
1985	Caroline Sheldon Literary Agency	Caroline Sheldon	John Agard, Patrice Lawrence	www.carolinesheldon.co.uk	Representing a roster of authors and illustrators, the agency's particular areas of interest are fiction and all types of children's books.
1986	Artellus Limited	Gabriele Pantucci (Chairman), Leslie Gardner (managing director)	Anthony Burgess, Robert Aickman (Estate), Harold Acton (Estate), Roger Lewis	artellusltd.co.uk	
1988	Andrew Lownie Literary Agency	Andrew Lownie (managing director)		www.andrewlownie.co.uk	Founded in 1988, a boutique literary agency with about two hundred non-fiction authors.
1988	Darley Anderson	Darley Anderson (founder and proprietor)	Lee Child, Martina Cole	darleyanderson.com	
1995	David Godwin Associates (DGA)	David Godwin (director), Heather Godwin (director)	Sade Adeniran, Lucy Ellmann, Aminatta Forna, Ian Jack, Vikram Seth, Marina Warner	www.davidgodwinassociates.com	Based in London, DGA represent a varied list of international writers, including novelists, poets, biographers, historians and journalists.
1996	Lucas Alexander Whitley (LAW)	Mark Lucas (director), Julian Alexander (director), Araminta Whitley (director), Philippa Milnes-Smith (managing director)	Frank Gardner, Sophie Kinsella, Andy McNab, Kate Mosse, Condé Nast, Philip Reeve, Chris Riddell, Nigel Slater, Alison Weir	http://www.lawagency.co.uk/	Based in London, UK, LAW was founded in 1996 by literary agents Mark Lucas, Julian Alexander, and Araminta Whitley. In 2001 Philippa Milnes-Smith joined the agency from Penguin Children's Books to create a children's and YA department.
1997	Annette Green Authors' Agency (AGA)	Annette Green, David Smith,	Adam Macqueen, Elizabeth Haynes, Maria McCann, Ian Marchant, Louis Barfe, Katherine Clements	www.annettegreenagency.co.uk	AGA was founded in 1997 by Annette Green. In 2001 David Smith, previously of Time Out magazine, joined the agency from Freshfields Bruckhaus Deringer law firm.
1997	BookBlast Ltd	Georgia de Chamberet, Jemma Jupp, Ben Fiagbe	Lesley Blanch (estate), George Elton Mayo (estate)	bookblast.org	London-based agency set up by a commissioning editor specialising in translations, representing literature with a cross cultural focus and literary estates. Also promotes the output of independent publishers. First website launched in 2000.
2002	Jenny Brown Associates	Jenny Brown		www.jennybrownassociates.com	The largest literary agency in Scotland.
2003	Eve White Literary Agency	Eve White (Owner, CEO and Agent), Ludo Cinelli (Managing Director and Agent)	Andy Stanton, Ruth Ware, Yvvette Edwards, Eloise Head, Abie Longstaff, Tracey Corderoy, Rae Earl Johnson, Sarah Ockwell-Smith, Luan Goldie.	www.evewhite.co.uk	Independent literary agency founded in 2003 by Eve White and based in London, UK. Eve White Literary Agency represents authors of fiction, non-fiction and children's/YA fiction. Its authors' books have gone on to become bestsellers, win awards and be longlisted for the Booker Prize and Women's Prize for Fiction.
2005	Graham Maw Christie Literary Agency	Jennifer Christie, Jane Graham Maw	Raynor Winn, Vex King, Michael Foley	www.grahammawchristie.com	A UK agency in London specialising in non-fiction, with a host of international bestsellers and Sunday Times Bestsellers across a wide range of subjects.
2007	United Agents	Peter Bennett-Jones (co-chairman), Lindy King (co-chairman), St. John Donald (managing director)		www.unitedagents.co.uk	In October 2013 Jon Elek of United Agents sold the North American rights for Tina Seskis's debut novel One Step Too Far to HarperCollins’s William Morrow imprint for $500,000.
2008	Writers House UK	Angharad Kowal (managing director)		www.writershouse.com	In April 2008, Writers House opened Writers House UK, a London-based office run by Angharad Kowal, dedicated to selling and supporting US Authors directly in the United Kingdom, British Commonwealth, Australia, and New Zealand. The UK office closed in 2017.
2009	The Bent Agency	Jenny Bent, Molly Ker Hawn		www.thebentagency.com	Based in London and New York. representing adult fiction and non-fiction, and children's and YA with a commitment to building bestsellers.
2012	Madeleine Milburn Ltd	Madeleine Milburn, Giles Milburn	CJ Daugherty, Cally Taylor Fiona Barton, Holly Bourne, Nuala Ellwood, Gail Honeyman, C.J. Tudor	www.madeleinemilburn.co.uk	Literary, TV & Film Agency based in Mayfair, London, founded by Madeleine Milburn in February 2012 Representing adult fiction and non-fiction, and children's and YA, with a reputation for launching new writers on a global level in major deals
2012	Hardman & Swainson	Caroline Hardman & Joanna Swainson (founders & literary agents), Hannah Ferguson (literary agent)		www.hardmanswainson.com	Based in London, UK, Hardman & Swainson was founded in June 2012 by Caroline Hardman and Joanna Swainson. In September 2014, Hannah Ferguson joined the agency from the Marsh Agency. Hardman & Swainson represents a range of fiction and non-fiction.
2012	Elise Dillsworth Agency (EDA)	Elise Dillsworth	Robert Antoni, Roy Heath (estate), Anthony Joseph, Irenosen Okojie, Yewande Omotoso, Courtney Pine, Noo Saro-Wiwa	elisedillsworthagency.com	Based in London, Elise Dillsworth Agency represents literary and general fiction and non-fiction (especially memoir, autobiography, biography, cookery and travel writing), with an aim to reflect writing that is international.
2013	Collective Talent	Steven Russell (director, agent)		www.collectivetalent.co.uk	Collective Talent represents screenwriters, directors, book and graphic novel rights.
2013	Rocking Chair Books Literary Agency	Samar Hammam (director & literary agent)	Warsan Shire, Lakambini Sitoy	www.rockingchairbooks.com	Dedicated to original page-turning books.
2014	Greyhound Literary Agents	Charlie Campbell, Sam Edenborough	SJ Bennett, Edward Brooke-Hitching, Rebecca Front, Maisie Hill, Will Hill, Julian Gough, Lias Saoudi	www.greyhoundliterary.co.uk	Founded as Kingsford Campbell, the agency became Greyhound Literary Agents in 2022. Based in London and represents a range of fiction, non-fiction and children's books.
2014	Skylark Literary	Amber Caraveo, Joanna Moult		www.skylark-literary.com	Specialist Children's and YA Literary Agency
2016	Pew Literary	Patrick Walsh (founder)	Tom Holland, Andrea Wulf	www.pewliterary.com	Founded by Patrick Walsh, previously of Conville & Walsh agency, which was sold to Curtis Brown and then renamed "C+W Agency".
2016	Golden Quill UK	John Grout	Victoria Ewart	https://goldenquilliterary.co.uk/	Located in UK, US and Spain. Represented Fiction and Nonfiction books.
2016	Blue Boar Books			www.blueboarbooks.yolasite.com	Children's, YA and Adult Fiction/Non-Fiction Literary Agents
2016	Outlaw Agents UK	Sam Bellis, Tom Edwards	Adam Manuel, Danny Martin	http://www.outlawagentsuk.com	UK Screenwriting Agent specialising in Film, TV, Video Games and viral campaign industries.
2017	Tin-Can Telephone Literary Agency	Cassian Hall		http://tctliteraryagency.com	Literary Agency based in Edinburgh, UK. Representing adult fiction, children's and YA. Breaking new ground by building a writers community around the agency.
2017	The Ruppin Agency	Jonathan Ruppin		www.ruppinagency.com	London-based literary agency set up by former bookseller, handling fiction and non-fiction for adult market; particularly keen to find voices from unrepresented communities.
2017	The Good Literary Agency (TGLA)		Joy Francis	www.thegoodliteraryagency.org	Only represents writers from a background under-represented in UK publishing, including writers of colour, working-class, disability, LGBTQ+. TGLA closed at the end of March 2025.
2020	Exprimez Literary Agency	Matthew Smith	Philip Norman, Jenny Boyd	www.exprimez.com	Representing UK authors including film/television and translation rights.
2020	Laxfield Literary Associates	Emma Shercliff	Brian Chikwava, Idza Luhumyo, Olumide Popoola, Tom Shakespeare	laxfieldliterary.com	Represents authors in Norfolk and Suffolk, and writers from under-represented backgrounds, with a particular interest in working with authors based in Africa, the Middle East and Ukraine.
2020	Riviera Artists Agency	Justin Jones, Gemma Harris		www.rivieraartistsagency.com	London - Miami - Monaco. Representing screenwriters, authors and motion picture/television talent.
2023	Rebecca Carter Literary	Rebecca Carter	Ferdia Lennon, Timothy Coulson, Olivia Laing, Diana Athill	www.rebeccacarterliterary.com	Representing UK authors, including film/television and translation rights.

== See also ==
- List of largest UK book publishers
