= Tom McGreevey =

American actor (born 1932)

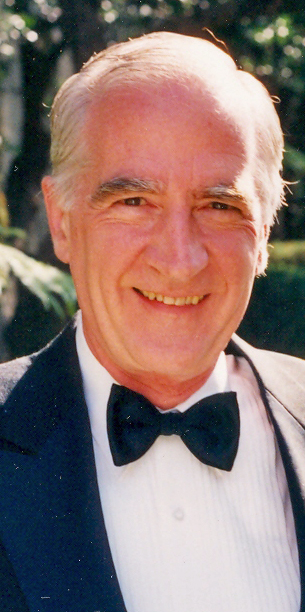
- McGreevey in 1988
- Born: Thomas Aquinas McGreevey; July 21, 1932; Brooklyn, New York
- Died: May 20, 2024 (aged 91); Cincinnati, Ohio
- Education: Academy of Dramatic Arts
- Alma mater: University of Illinois, Urbana-Champagne
- Occupations: actor, writer, editor, art director
- Years active: 1959 - 1997

Thomas Aquinas McGreevey (July 21, 1932 – May 20, 2024) was an American actor who worked in theater, television, commercials, and feature films. His career spanned four decades from the late 1950s to the late 1990s. He is best remembered for his role as “Mr. Patches” on the long-running children’s program, The Uncle Al Show. Additionally, he worked for many years as an editor and art director in greeting cards, at both American Greetings and Gibson Greetings (Cincinnati, Ohio). After retiring from acting, McGreevey wrote books and articles about film history. In 2024, McGreevey died at age 91.

== Early life ==
Tom McGreevey was born in Brooklyn, New York, to Kathryn (Hart) and Donald E. McGreevey, a buyer for the Roman Catholic Orphan’s Society. His parents met while performing in an amateur stage production for the benefit of St. Catherine of Genoa’s parish, Brooklyn. Within a few months, they were married and, eventually, settled in Baldwin, Long Island.

At 18, McGreevey enlisted in the Marine Corps from 1950 to 1954, serving in Korea and Japan. Subsequently, he enrolled in and graduated from the American Academy of Dramatic Arts in New York City and continued his dramatic training with Shakespearean scholar Charles H. Shattuck at the University of Illinois, Urbana-Champagne. At the university, McGreevey appeared in many plays, including the role of Sir Toby Belch in Shattuck's 1961 production of Twelfth Night.

== Career ==
=== 1960s–1970s: Early career in theater and radio hosting ===
In the early 1960s, McGreevey used the stage name "Thom McGreevey," performing in summer stock with Ohio's Peninsula Players, where he starred as Chris in Arthur Miller's All My Sons, and at the Karamu House (Cleveland, Ohio), where he appeared in In Splendid Error and Purlie Victorious.

Leaving Cleveland for Cincinnati, McGreevey hosted a late-night radio show known as "Jelly Pudding" on the progressive rock station WEBN-FM (Cincinnati) and later at WDAI-FM (Chicago).

In the early 1970s, he transitioned to television, appearing as "Mr. Patches" on the long-running children's program, The Uncle Al Show (WCPO-TV, Cincinnati). In addition to providing educational segments for Uncle Al, McGreevey was the puppeteer and voice for a dozen puppets, including Mother Goose.

"Mr. Patches" quickly became a local celebrity, entertaining in a patchwork jacket. As "Mr. Patches," McGreevey participated in many community activities, from Girl Scout cookie eating contests and appearances with Santa Claus to numerous fundraisers, such as the annual auction for PBS station WCET and the March of Dimes. He was featured in the opening shows of the Cincinnati Coliseum (Heritage Bank Center) in 1975 and the 1976 Bicentennial Summer Celebration at Fountain Square. He also appeared weekly on WCPO's Sunday morning children's show, "Play it Safe," hosted by police officer Bob Morgan.

Before leaving Cincinnati, McGreevey appeared in a television pilot, The Yellow Bus, produced as a possible daytime series with a target audience of 6 - 12 year olds. Singer Larry Groce, later featured on many records for Disney, starred as a guide working at Kings Island amusement park. McGreevey provided the voice for and operated Groce's sidekick, a puppet named "Hot Rod," created by Hanna-Barbera’s Charles DeMuth. The show was designed to feature local talent and Kings Island; however, CBS did not pick up the series.

In the late 1970s, McGreevey returned to New York City and began working on several soap operas, including Edge of Night, All My Children, and Love of Life. There, he also appeared in regional commercials, including one for Belmont Race Track, as well as in commercials and in print ads for many national brands, such as AARP, McDonald's, Budweiser, and Lipton, playing a plain-spoken New Englander opposite Don Meredith.

=== 1980s–1989: Return to theater and television ===
In the 1980s, McGreevey returned to legitimate theater, appearing in two productions at the Melrose Theater in Los Angeles: Cat on a Hot Tin Roof (1981), directed by William Shatner, and A Case of Libel (1983).

Later in 1983, McGreevey was cast in Alienated Affections/Land of the Blind at the Church of Scientology owned Celebrity Centre in Los Angeles. In 1984, he had a leading role in Couple of the Year, mounted at the Lambs Theater in Manhattan, directed by long-term artistic director of the Cincinnati Playhouse, Edward Stern.

During 1986–1987, he was cast as Harry in the Arizona Theatre Company production of the Edward Albee play A Delicate Balance, playing Phoenix and Tucson.

Concurrently, McGreevey also worked regularly in episodic television, notably: Dallas, Dynasty, Falcon Crest, Remington Steele, Simon & Simon, Hunter, Hill Street Blues and L.A. Law.

During his first ten weeks in Los Angeles, McGreevey was cast in four commercials and appeared in the series Soap. In 1983, he was featured on the television series Fame, playing Tom Reardon, the father of regular David Reardon (Morgan Stevens), the high school's drama coach. And, in 1987, McGreevey was a guest star on The Golden Girls, playing the veterinarian who examines the pig inherited by Rose Nyland (Betty White).

Also, while in Los Angeles, McGreevey appeared on General Hospital as the Scottish minister who married characters Duke Lavery and Anna Devane in 1987.

=== 1989–1991: Acting in feature films ===
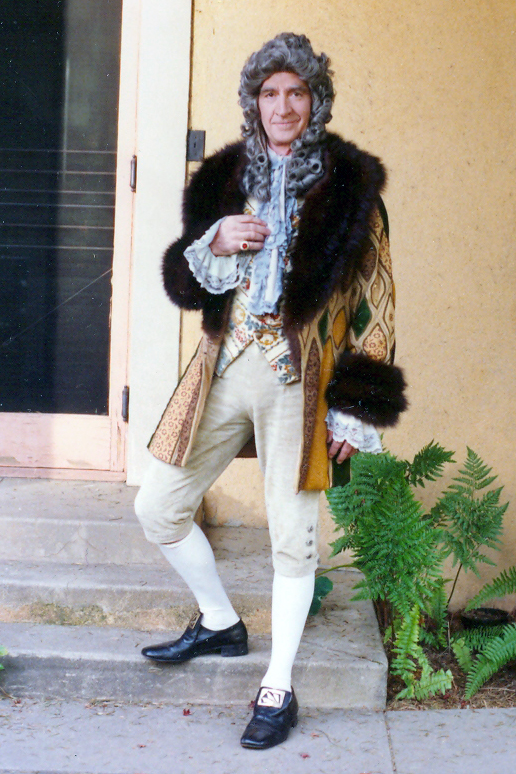
Tom McGreevey as "The Uncle," in The Favorite (1989)

McGreevey was featured in the following made-for-television movies and mini-series: Killer in the Mirror; Rock Hudson; Shakedown on the Sunset Strip; Polly (Disney's 1989 remake of Pollyanna); An Inconvenient Woman, based on the novel by Dominick Dunne; and Lady Against the Odds, for which director/cinematographer Bradford Mays won an Emmy in 1992 (Cinematography for a Miniseries). He also appeared in the pilot for Shannon's Deal, written by John Sayles and directed by Lewis Teague.

The Emmy-winning short Ziggy's Gift teamed McGreevey with Ziggy's creator and former American Greetings colleague, Tom Wilson. McGreevey provided the voice for "Officer O'Connor."

His work in feature films includes: The Favorite (1989) starring F. Murray Abraham; Angel Town (1990), the film debut of kickboxer Olivier Gruner; and The Naked Gun 2½: The Smell of Fear (1991), in which McGreevey's character was credited as: "Very well, sir. It's from the lady." In Airplane II: The Sequel, McGreevey's role as "Karl Malden" (spoofing Malden's ads for American Express Travelers checks) was cut from the final release but can be seen in the film's trailer.

Despite a talent for comedy, McGreevey was typecast as ministers, doctors, judges and administrators. A notable exception was his stage performance in Neil Simon's God's Favorite (Marimont Players, 1973).

=== 1992: Writing and film preservation ===
In 1992, McGreevey retired from acting, returning to writing and editing. In addition to authoring several articles about film history, he is the co-author of the book Movie Westerns, an introduction to the genre for middle school readers, and Our Movie Heritage, which argues for the importance of film preservation.

McGreevey was also a member of MENSA, SAG and AFTRA.

== Death ==
On May 20, 2024, McGreevey died at the age of 91, in Cincinnati, Ohio.

== Filmography ==
- Ziggy's Gift (1982)
- Killer in the Mirror (1986)
- The Favorite (1989, also titled Intimate Power)
- Polly (1989)
- Angel Town (1990)
- Rock Hudson (1990)
- The Naked Gun 2 ½: The Smell of Fear (1991)
- An Inconvenient Woman (1991, ABC Miniseries)
- Lady Against the Odds (1992)

== Bibliography ==
- Yeck, Joanne L. and Tom McGreevey (1994). Movie Westerns. Lerner Publications. p 80. ISBN 9780822516439.
- McGreevey, Tom and Yeck, Joanne L. (1997). Our Movie Heritage. Rutgers University Press. p 184. ISBN 9780813524313.
