= Night School (disambiguation) =

A night school is a school which holds courses in the evenings or at night.

Night School may also refer to:

== Literature ==
- "Night School", a short story by Raymond Carver included in the 1976 collection Will You Please Be Quiet, Please?
- Night School (play), a play by Harold Pinter
- Nightschool (manga), a 2008 original English-language manga written and illustrated by Svetlana Chmakova
- Night School, by Mari Mancusi 2011
- Night School, by Caroline Cooney 1995
- Night School, by Isobelle Carmody 2009
- Night School (novel), by Lee Child 2016 (Jack Reacher novel)
- Night School books by CJ Daugherty, 2012

== Film and TV ==
- "Night School", a 1949 episode of the TV series The Life of Riley
- Night School (1956 film), a 1956 Japanese film
- Night School (1981 film), a 1981 horror film
- Night School (2018 film), a 2018 comedy film
- Night School: the Web Series, a British web series

== Music ==
- Night school, rap album by Shed Theory member Facy
- Night School, jazz album by Stanley Clarke 2007
- "Night School", a track on Frank Zappa's 1986 album Jazz from Hell
- "Nightschool" by Scottish band The Xcerts In the Cold Wind We Smile

== Video games ==
- Night School Studio, an American indie video game developer
