= Waverley Abbey =

Cistercian abbey in Surrey, UK

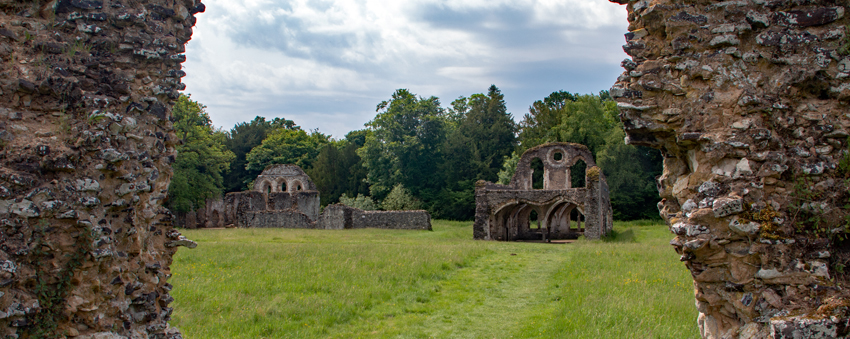
- The ruins of Waverley Abbey

- Location within Surrey
- Interactive map of Waverley Abbey

Monastery information
- Full name: The Abbey of the Blessed Mary of Waverley
- Order: Cistercian
- Established: 1128
- Disestablished: 1536
- Mother house: L'Aumône Abbey, Normandy, France
- Dedication: St Mary

People
- Founder: William Giffard, Bishop of Winchester

Site
- Location: Borough of Waverley, Surrey, England
- Coordinates: 51°12′00″N 0°45′36″W
- Visible remains: Ruins
- Public access: Yes: Free of Charge; Managed by English Heritage

Waverley Abbey was the first Cistercian abbey in England, founded in 1128 by William Giffard, the Bishop of Winchester.

Located about 2 miles (3.2 km) southeast of Farnham, Surrey, it is situated on a flood-plain; surrounded by current and previous channels of the River Wey. It was damaged on more than one occasion by severe flooding, resulting in rebuilding in the 13th century. Despite being the first Cistercian abbey in England, and being motherhouse to several other abbeys, Waverley was "slenderly endowed" and its monks are recorded as having endured poverty and famine.

The abbey was suppressed in 1536 as part of King Henry VIII's Dissolution of the Monasteries. Subsequently, largely demolished, its stone was reused in local buildings, likely including "Waverley Abbey House", which was built in 1723 in the northern portion of the former abbey precinct.

Waverley Abbey House, the ruins of the abbey and the surrounding land are all part of a conservation area. The house is a Grade II* listed building and the ruins a scheduled monument.

The ruins of the abbey are currently managed by English Heritage and open to the public.

== History ==
Waverley Abbey was founded by Bishop William Giffard on 24 November 1128. The first abbot and 12 monks were brought from L'Aumône Abbey in Normandy, France.

Giffard endowed the new abbey with all the land within the parish of Waverley, two acres of meadow at Elstead, and gave the monks permission to cut wood from his woodland at Farnham. Giffard's successor as Bishop of Winchester, Henry of Blois (younger brother of King Stephen) donated a virgate (30 acres) of land at Wandford, and gave further rights at Farnham, with permission to "dig turf, heath, stone and sand".

Henry's brother King Stephen granted the abbey land at Neatham, and ("at the request of his brother") freed the abbey from the military obligations usually required of feudal landlords (Frankalmoin), and excused the abbey from the payment of certain taxes including the Danegeld. The abbey was freed from further taxes (tithes) by a papal bull issued by Pope Eugenius III in 1147.

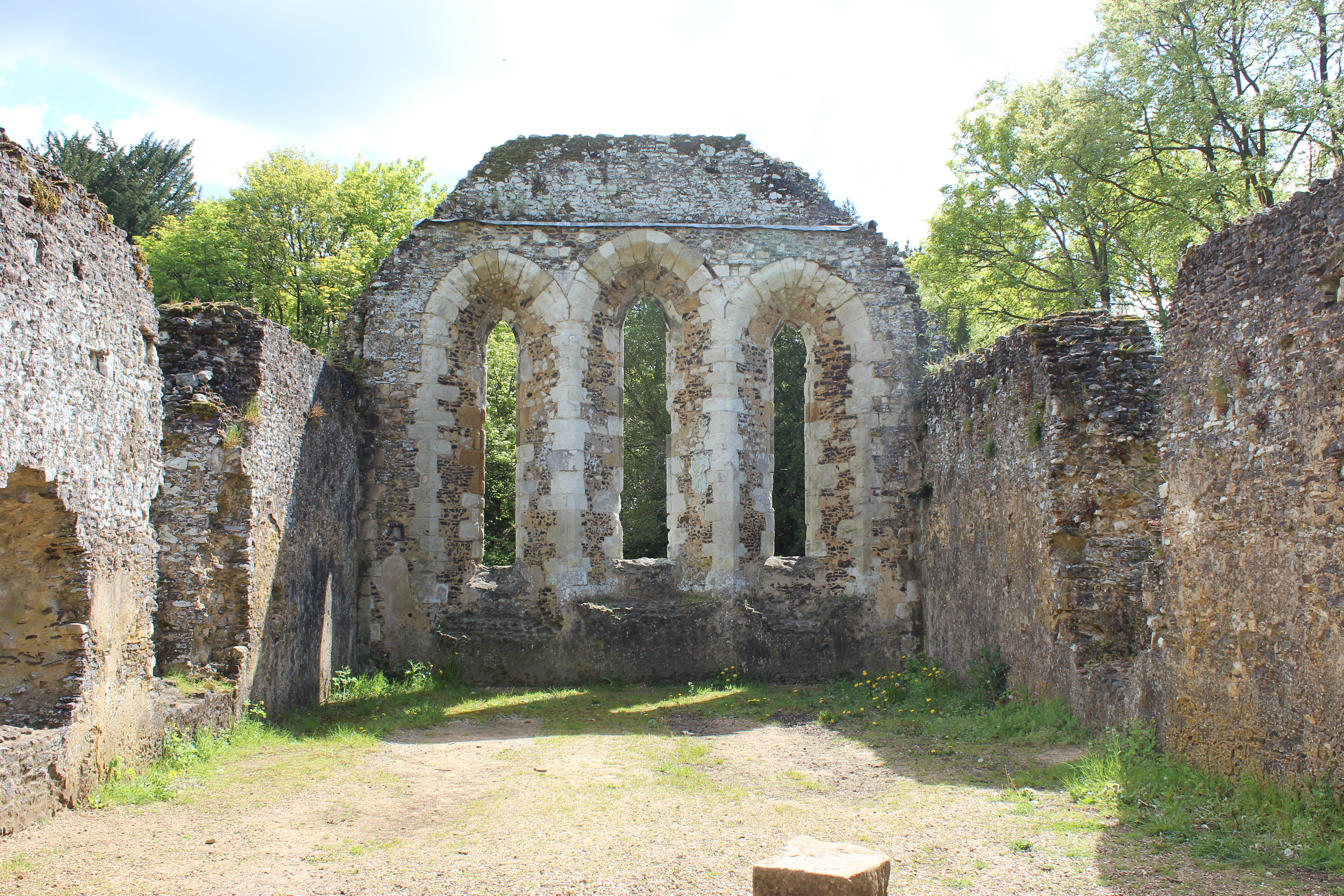
Remains of the 13th-century monks' dormitory

The abbey's endowment was added to by Adeliza of Louvain (wife of King Henry I), who donated the grange at Northolt. Faramus of Boulogne, nephew of King Stephen, sold the manor of Wanborough to the abbey for 125 marks of silver. The abbey's endowment and privileges were confirmed by charters issued by King Richard I and King John.

Despite the donations, the abbey was described as "slenderly endowed", and was recorded as having an income of only £98 1s. 8d. in the 1291 Taxation Roll. 'A History of the County of Surrey' states: "Contrasted with the vast estates of a foundation like Bermondsey [Abbey], such a modest rent roll sinks into insignificance". Despite the small income, the abbey seems to have been home to a large number of monks, with 120 lay brothers and 70 religious brothers recorded in 1187.

Within the abbey's first 200 years, seven of the abbey's monks were chosen to become abbots at other monasteries. As the first Cistercian Abbey in England, it became motherhouse of several other Cistercian houses: including Garendon Abbey, founded in Leicestershire by Robert de Beaumont, 2nd Earl of Leicester; Forde Abbey, founded in Dorset by Richard de Brioniis; Coombe Abbey, founded in Warwickshire by Richard de Camville; and Thame Abbey, founded in Oxfordshire by Alexander, Bishop of Lincoln. Many of these became mother-houses themselves, to other Cistercian monasteries. For a time, the Abbot of Waverley Abbey claimed precedence over all the other Cistercian Abbots in England; however, this was disputed by the Abbot of Furness Abbey.

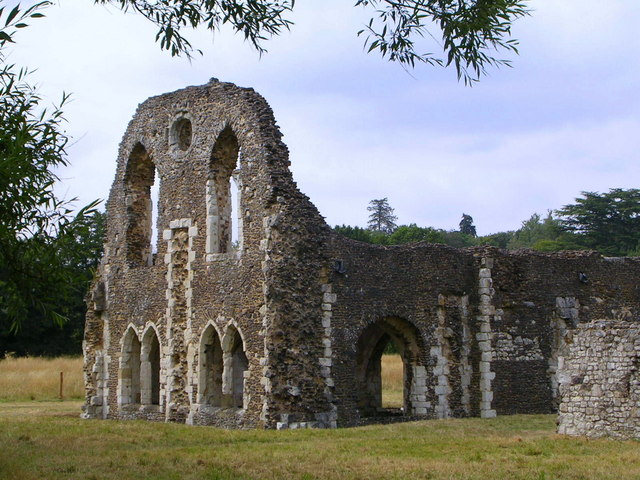
The ruins of Waverley Abbey

=== 13th century ===
The 13th century was a difficult time for the abbey. In July 1201 the abbey was flooded "and all but carried away" by a storm which caused the abbey's crops to fail. The abbey was rebuilt during the 13th century, and much of the remains visible today date from this period. Construction on the new abbey church began in March 1203–04, financed by William, Rector of Broadwater; however, the abbey's monks were struck by famine and forced to beg food from other monastic houses.

Following a dispute with the pope, in 1208 King John confiscated all ecclesiastical property; however, the same year he spent "the last days of Holy Week" at Waverley Abbey, and allowed the return of its possessions to allow them to continue the reconstruction of the church. Two years later, after the Cistercian order refused to give in to John's demands for money, John withdrew all of the abbey's privileges. Many of the monks fled the abbey and, in fear, the abbot "fled away by night". King John then issued a decree forbidding any Cistercians to enter or leave the country.

In 1212 John confiscated all of the Cistercian Order's property using "false letters" which "reigned their property to him". The situation improved when John's dispute with the pope ended. The persecution of Waverley appears to have ended by October 1214, when the abbot was sent on official business on behalf of the King. The church's construction appears to have carried on throughout the difficult period, as on 10 July 1214 five altars were consecrated by Albin, Bishop of Ferns.

In 1225 the abbey was visited by King Henry III; he took communion at the abbey on 16 December 1225. Construction of the church was not completed, however, until 1278 (74/5 years after it began), when Nicholas de Ely, Bishop of Winchester blessed the church in honour of the Virgin Mary. The blessing was followed by a feast supposedly attended by 7,066 people; including six abbots and many knights and ladies.

The abbey's difficult century continued with further floods in 1233; up to 8 ft in height, the flood destroyed several of the abbey's bridges and property. Another flood on 28 November 1265 flooded the abbey's lower buildings forcing the monks "to take refuge in the church". In 1291 the abbey was described as in "grievous poverty" after their crops had failed.

The Annals of Waverley, written by the monks, records notable national and international events from the 10th to the late 13th centuries.

=== Dissolution ===
The Valor Ecclesiasticus of 1535 records the abbey as having a clear annual income of £174 8s. 3½d. As such it was dissolved with the lesser (poorer) monasteries in 1536, as part of King Henry VIII's Dissolution of the Monasteries. There were only thirteen monks in the community at the time.

=== Abbots of Waverley ===
The following is a list of the abbots of Waverley Abbey.

- John, died 1128
- Gilbert, 1128–9
- Henry, died 1182
- Henry of Chichester, 1182, resigned 1187
- Christopher (abbot of Bruerne, Oxfordshire), 1187, removed from office 1196
- John II. (hospitaller), 1196, died 1201
- John III. (cellarer), 1201, died 1216
- Adam (sub-prior), 1216, resigned 1219
- Adam II. (abbot of Garendon Abbey, Leicestershire), 1219, resigned 1236
- Walter Giffard (abbot of Bittlesden, Bucks), 1236, died 1252
- Ralph (abbot of Dunkewell, Devon), 1252, resigned 1266
- William de London, 1266
- William de Hungerford, resigned 1276
- Hugh de Leukenor, 1276, died 1285
- Philip de Bedwinde, 1285
- William, occurs 1316
- Robert, occurs 1335
- John III., 1344
- John IV., 1349, died 1361
- John de Enford, occurs 1385–6
- William Hakeleston, 1386, died 1399
- John Brid, 1399–1400
- Henry, occurs 1433
- William, occurs 1452
- William Martyn, 1456
- Thomas, occurs 1478 and 1500
- William, occurs 1509
- John, occurs 1529
- William Alyng, occurs 1535

== History after the Dissolution ==
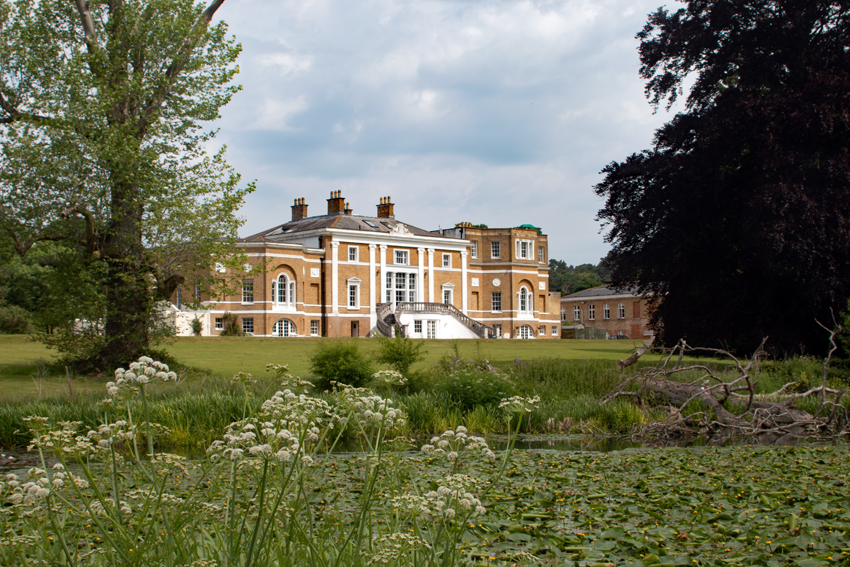
Waverley Abbey House, built 1725

Following dissolution the former abbey was granted to Sir William Fitzherbert, who was the treasurer of the king's household. The abbey itself was mostly demolished, with stone reused in local building work including at Loseley Park.

Waverley Abbey House was built within the former abbey precinct, just north of the core abbey ruins. The east service court contains masonry from an earlier building, thought to date from the period just after the dissolution. The house was constructed in 1725 for John Aislabie, former Chancellor of the Exchequer, to a design by Colen Campbell, possibly for the use of John's brother William, who had recently returned from India. William died the same year and the house was sold to Charles Child of Guildford, who in turn sold it to Thomas Orby Hunter in 1847.

Later in the century Orby Hunter added wings, with further additions by Sir Robert Rich, 5th Baronet before 1786. It was bought around 1796 by the merchant John (later Poulett) Thomson, from Sir Charles Rich, 1st Baronet. He sold it about 1832 to George Thomas Nicholson, who rebuilt it after a fire in 1833.

In the 20th century Waverley Abbey was owned by the Anderson family. Rupert Darnley Anderson, son of Thomas Darnley Anderson of Liverpool, inherited it from his brother Charles Rupert Anderson in 1894. His father had purchased it around 1869.

Waverley Abbey House is now separated from the ruins by an artificial lake.

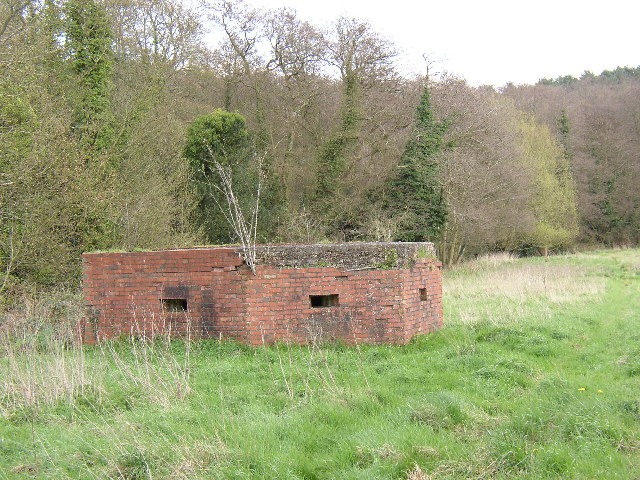
Pillbox near Waverley Abbey

=== World Wars ===
During the First World War the house was the first country house to be converted into a military hospital. It treated over 5,000 soldiers.

Part of the former abbey site formed part of the defenses called the "GHQ Line", set up to protect London during the Second World War. The abbey precinct contains numerous WWII relics including anti-tank gun emplacements, possible auxiliary unit bases, "hideouts", pillboxes, "anti-tank pimples" and "cylinders", and anti-tank roadblocks and ditches.

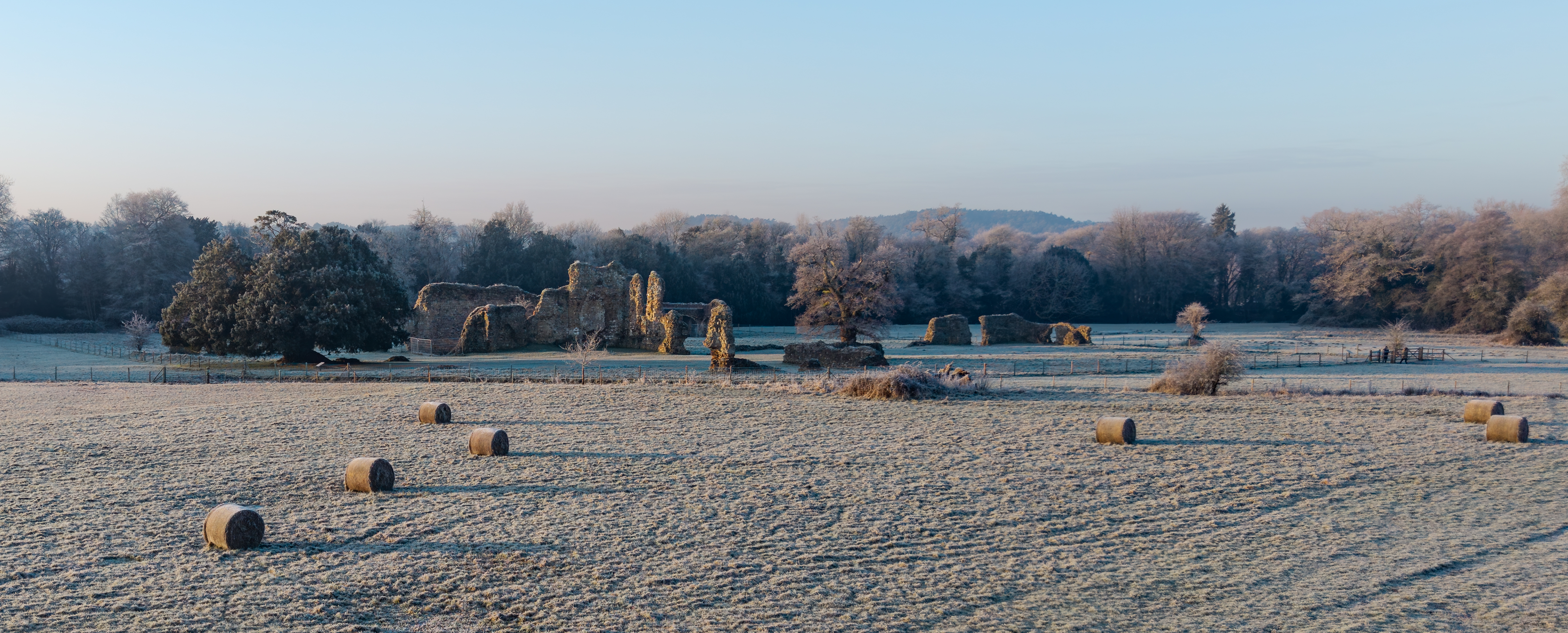
Waverley Abbey ruins in winter

=== Today ===
Following the wars Waverley Abbey House became a nursing home. In 1983 it was purchased (and subsequently restored) by the Christian not-for-profit organisation, CWR. The house is currently used by CWR as a training and conference centre.

The ruins of the original abbey are managed by English Heritage and open to the public.

== Architectural description and remains ==
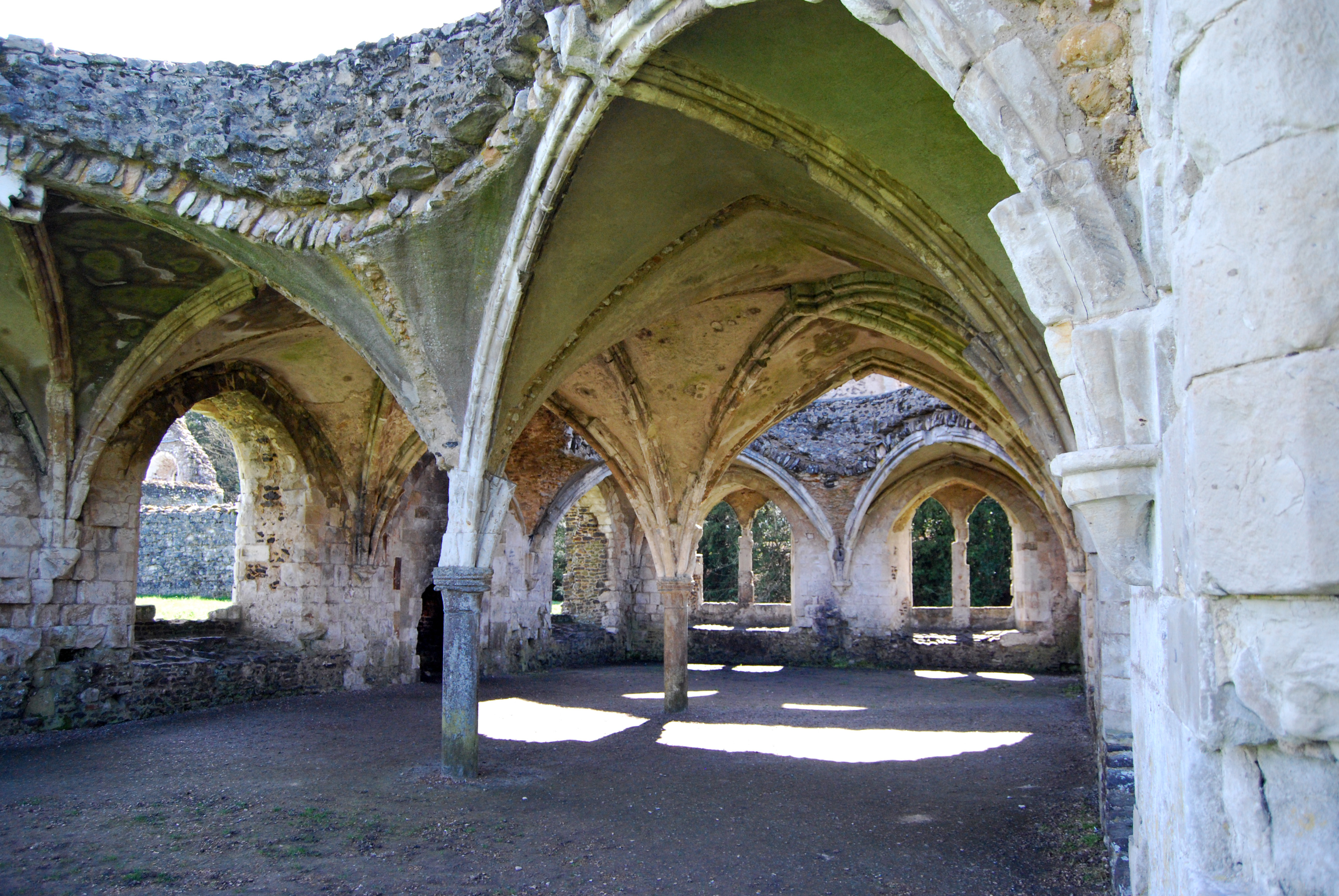
Remains of the undercroft of the lay brothers' refectory

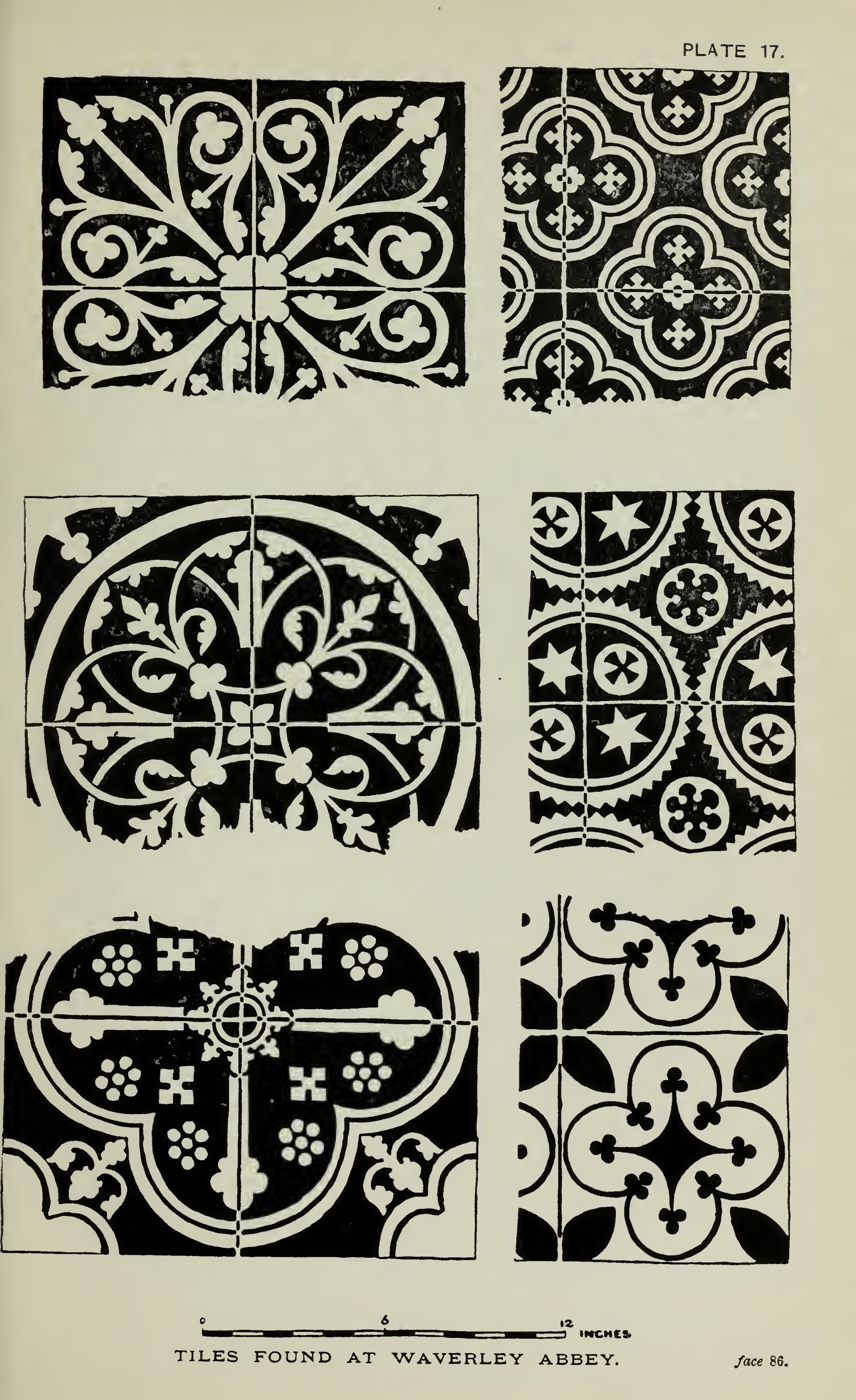
Tiles discovered during the excavations of Waverley Abbey, 1899-1902

Waverley Abbey followed the typical arrangement of English Monasteries. The Abbey church, which was around 91 meters long, sat to the north of the monastic complex. To the south of the church was the cloister, the eastern range of which contained the chapter house and monk's dormitory. The southern range of the cloister contained the refectory and latrines. The eastern range contained the lay brothers' refectory and dormitory. The cemetery was located to the east and north of the abbey church.

The abbey's immediate precinct occupied around 50 acres, with the River Wey forming the southern and eastern boundaries. In addition to the core abbey complex, the precinct contained buildings such as the brewhouse and features such as fishponds to supply food.

=== The ruins ===
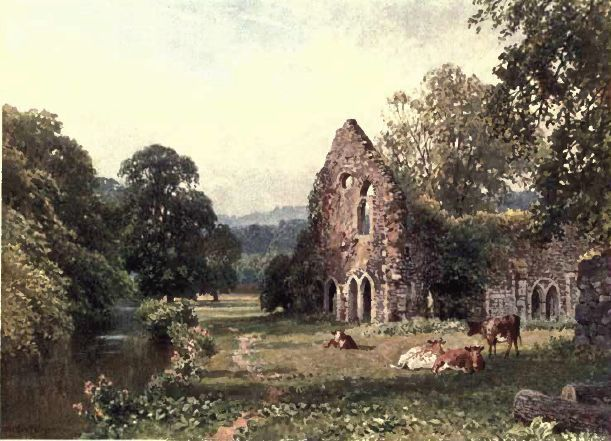
Painting of the ruins of Waverley Abbey by Harry Sutton Palmer, 1906.

Only part of the abbey remains standing, with the ruins dating from the abbey's 13th-century reconstruction. The most substantial remains are that of the vaulted undercroft, or cellar, of the lay brother's refectory, and the walls of the monk's dormitory, which largely survive to roof height. There also survives the remains of the chapter house and traces of the north and south transepts of the abbey church.

Earthworks in the eastern portion of the abbey's precinct reveal the remains of several fishponds and a "water supply system".

The site was excavated by the Surrey Archaeological Society between 1890 and 1903, and the ruins restored in 1966 when the site was under the care of the Ministry of Works.

The ruins, Waverley Abbey House, and the surrounding land were all designated a conservation area in 1989. Waverley Abbey House is protected as a Grade II* Listed Building, while the abbey ruins are a scheduled monument.

=== Ancient yew tree ===
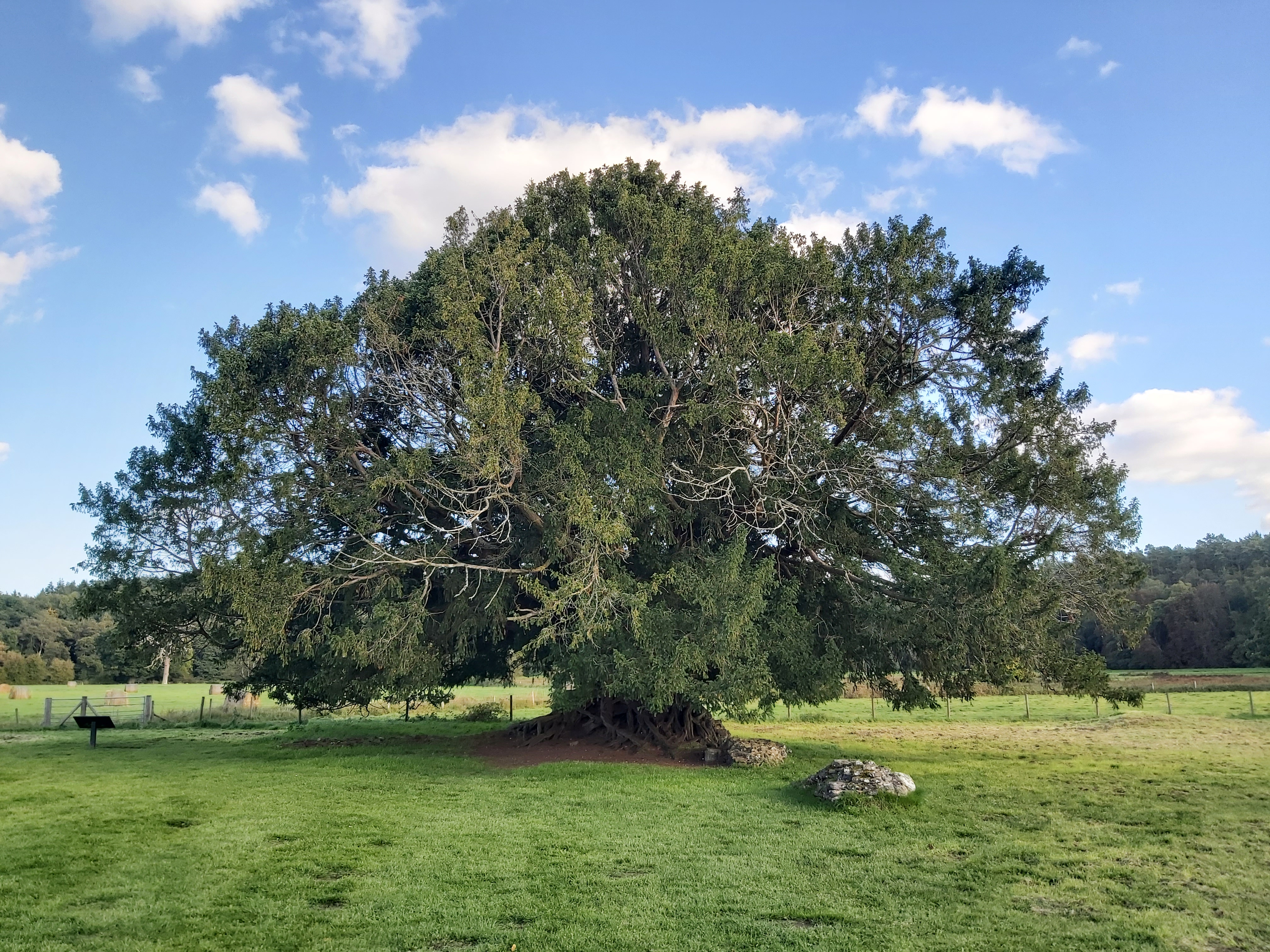
The yew tree at Waverley Abbey in October 2022

A yew tree (Taxus baccata), which is nearly 500 years old, grows on the ruins of the walls on the southeast corner of the church. In 2022, it won the UK Tree of the Year competition organised by the Woodland Trust.

=== High risk of flooding ===
In 2014, an English Heritage report identified that there is a high risk of flooding at Waverley Abbey. It detailed an "extensive threat to the south half of the estate", affecting exposed footings, masonry and land surface.

== In popular culture ==
Walter Scott chose the name "Waverley" for the hero of his novel Waverley. He did not himself say that this name was connected with Waverley Abbey, but Leslie Stephen, writing in the 1897 Dictionary of National Biography, stated "The name was probably suggested by Waverley Abbey, near Farnham, which was within a ride of Ellis's house where he had been recently staying."

Waverley Abbey was featured in Arthur Conan Doyle's classical romance, Sir Nigel. It was the scene of his winning of his war horse, Pommers, and his youthful conflict with the abbey authorities.

=== Use as a film set ===
The abbey ruins have been used as a location in the filming of a number of films and television dramas:

- Invasion (2001, miniseries)
- 28 Days Later (2002)
- Elizabeth: The Golden Age (2007, about Elizabeth I of England)
- Hot Fuzz (2007)
- Agatha Christie's Marple : Nemesis (2007, TV drama)
- Animal Soup (2009, video)
- Creation (2009, film about Charles Darwin)
- Night School: the Web Series (2014, web series)
- Into the Woods (2014, film)
- The Huntsman: Winter's War (2016, film)
- The Mummy (2017, film)
- Howards End (2017 television drama)
- Cursed (2020, TV series)

== Bibliography ==
- Brakspear, Harold (1905). Waverley Abbey. Surrey Archaeological Society.
- Burke, Sir Bernard (1871). A Genealogical and Heraldic History of the Landed Gentry of Great Britain & Ireland. Harrison.
- Dunphy, Graeme; Bratu, Cristian, eds. (2016). Encyclopedia of the Medieval Chronicle. Leiden: Brill. doi:10.1163/2213-2139_emc_SIM_02527.
- Rigney, Ann (2012). The Afterlives of Walter Scott: Memory on the Move. Oxford University Press. ISBN 9780199644018.
