= Intimate Power =

Intimate Power may refer to:

- Intimate Power (Pouvoir intime), a Canadian film released in 1986,
- an alternate title for the 1989 film The Favorite.
