= Aimée du Buc de Rivéry =

French heiress (born 1776)

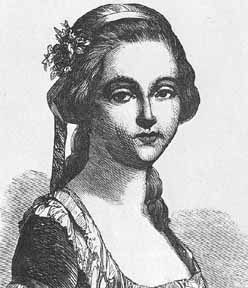
- Born: Aimée du Buc de Rivéry; 4 December 1776; Pointe Royale, Le Robert, Martinique
- Disappeared: July or August 1788; At sea, between France and Martinique
- Status: Missing
- Died: Unknown
- Parent(s): Henri du Buc de Rivéry (1748–1808) and Marie Anne Arbousset-Beaufond (1739–1811)

Aimée du Buc de Rivéry (born 4 December 1776) was a French heiress, distantly related to Joséphine de Beauharnais (first wife of Napoleon), who went missing at sea as a young woman. She was thought by some to have been captured by Barbary pirates, sold as a harem concubine, and was the same person as Nakşîdil Sultan, mother of Sultan Mahmud II of the Ottoman Empire; but this theory has been debunked.

== Life ==
Aimée was born on 4 December 1776, the daughter of wealthy French plantation owner Henri du Buc de Rivéry (1748–1808) and Marie Anne Arbousset-Beaufond (1739–1811) in Pointe Royale, south-west of Le Robert on the Caribbean island of Martinique. The document recording her baptism and birth was written by the priest, Fr. Trepsac ( François Augustin Trepsac) Apostolic Prefect for Martinique and the translation reads 'On the 19th December 1776, I baptised Aimée Augustin Marie Joseph, born the 4th of the same month, from the legitimate marriage of Henry Dubuq de Rivéry and Marie-Anne d'Arbousset Beaufond, her mother and father.' The document then describes her godfather, Pierre d'Arbousset (her uncle) and her godmother, Marie-Anne Victoire Dubuq (her aunt). The actual document recording her baptism on December 19, 1776 and her birth, December 4, 1776 can be found in the French National Archives for Le Robert, Martinique, 1776 page 14

She was a distant cousin-in-law of Empress Josephine through Josephine's first marriage to Alexandre de Beauharnais, who was executed during the Reign of Terror.

After being sent to a convent school in France, Aimée was returning home in July or August 1788 when her ship vanished at sea.

It was popularly theorized that Barbary pirates attacked and captured the ship. Some theories suggest she was sold into the Barbary slave trade and eventually sent to Constantinople as a gift to the Ottoman Sultan's Imperial harem by the Bey of Algiers.

== Legend about her being Valide Nakşidil Sultan ==
According to the legend, Aimée became the wife of the Sultan Abdul Hamid I, taking the name of Nakşidil. She supposedly taught the Sultan French and introduces French ideas to him, and so to the Ottoman people. For the first time, a permanent ambassador was sent from Constantinople to Paris. The legend credits her with influencing the Sultan to make French-style reforms which then led to his death at the hands of the Janissaries and the Ulema, since both groups opposed liberalization of the empire. After his death, Nakşidil continued to hold influence over Mahmud II, either as his biological or foster mother, having had a hand in his education. When Mahmud II succeeded Abdul Hamid as Sultan, he started a French newspaper and allowed Nakşidil to decorate the Topkapı Palace in rococo style, which was popular in France at that time.

Several retellings of the legend claim that she even exerted influence in foreign policy, and that the Ottoman ruler's attitude towards the French deteriorated as a consequence of Napoléon's divorce of Aimée's cousin-in-law, Joséphine Bonaparte, in order to marry Marie Louise. This was taken to explain the Ottomans conceding in their war with Russia (to enable their resistance against Napoléon) as well as the Ottomans siding with England over France during the Napoleonic Wars.

The legend of Aimée as Nakşidil ends with claiming that she accepted Islam as part of the harem etiquette, since it was the religion of her husband, yet always remained a Roman Catholic in her heart. Supposedly, her last wish was for a Christian priest to perform the last rites. Her son, Mahmud II, did not deny her this: as Aimée lay dying, a priest passed for the first time through the Seraglio, to perform the Holy Sacrament before her death. Her tomb lies not far from the Hagia Sophia.

== Controversy over the legend ==
Some researchers have looked into the alleged history of Aimée du Buc de Rivéry in the royal harem and found it implausible.

According to Turkish historian Necdet Sakaoğlu, Nakşîdil Sultan was ethnically Georgian in origin.

While several stories claimed that Aimée was abducted in 1781, other stories took into account that Aimée was well in France with her family until the year 1788 at least. This means that she could not have been the biological mother of Mahmud II, born in 1785. In the latter recounts of the tale, Aimée is only his foster mother, while his birth mother died in his childhood.

None of those accounts however are considering a contemporary source from the year 1817: Nakşidil was reportedly abducted when she was still two years old. That version of her story, if true, would make it impossible for her to be identical with the missing Aimée.

Robert Vine wrote: "The myth of two cousins from a Caribbean island becoming respectively the wife of the French Emperor and the mother of the Ottoman Sultan has an obvious romantic attraction – but by the same token, is highly improbable, unless provided with solid factual proof".

There are however indications that seeds of the legend have been carefully planted. Several older myths, dating back even to the early 16th century, already purported connections between the French and the Ottoman monarchy. These have been traced to be politically motivated fabrications, so that alliances between the respective monarchs were seen as justifiable. The Aimée-Nakşidil tale distinctly parallels these older tales. In times of monarchy, the stories about abducted French princesses weren't repudiated to maintain good relations – in fact, both Napoleon III and Abdülaziz were pleased to announce their kinship to each other, years later. In later times this and similar harem tales have been used to perpetuate the prejudice of Turkey, the Middle East and the Islam in general as mysterious and despotic in nature, despite more accurate accounts available. The legend furthermore reinforced prejudices of the Ottoman Empire as a backwater country, where even a western slave consort was able to initiate an overdue modernization while the primitive natives couldn't conceive necessary reforms.

== Popular fiction and uncritical recounts ==
- The Wilder Shores of Love by Lesley Blanch, London: Phoenix Press and New York: Simon & Schuster, 1954
- The Veiled Sultan by March Cost (pen name of Margaret Mackie Morrison) (NY: Vanguard Press, 1969)
- Sultana by Prince Michael of Greece (NY: Harper & Row, 1983), ISBN 0-06-015166-8
- Valide by Barbara Chase-Riboud, 1986
- Aimée's story, further fictionalized, was told in the 1989 movie Intimate Power (a.k.a. The Favorite), in which she was portrayed by Amber O'Shea, and which also starred F. Murray Abraham. It was based on the novel Sultana by Prince Michael of Greece.
- Seraglio by Janet Wallach (NY: Nan A. Talese, 2003), ISBN 978-0-385-49046-7 (0-385-49046-1)
- The Janissary Tree by Jason Goodwin (NY: Farrar, Straus and Giroux div. of Macmillan, 2006), ISBN 0-374-17860-7/978-0374178604; not just about her, but she is a major character in this and four subsequent novels in the Yashim investigator series.
- The French Odalisque by Sean Graham (London: Orbach and Chambers, 2009) ISBN 0-85514-502-1 ISBN 978-0-85514-502-6

== See also ==
- List of people who disappeared mysteriously at sea
