= Caroline Michel =

Literary agent (born 1959)

Caroline Michel DBE FRSA
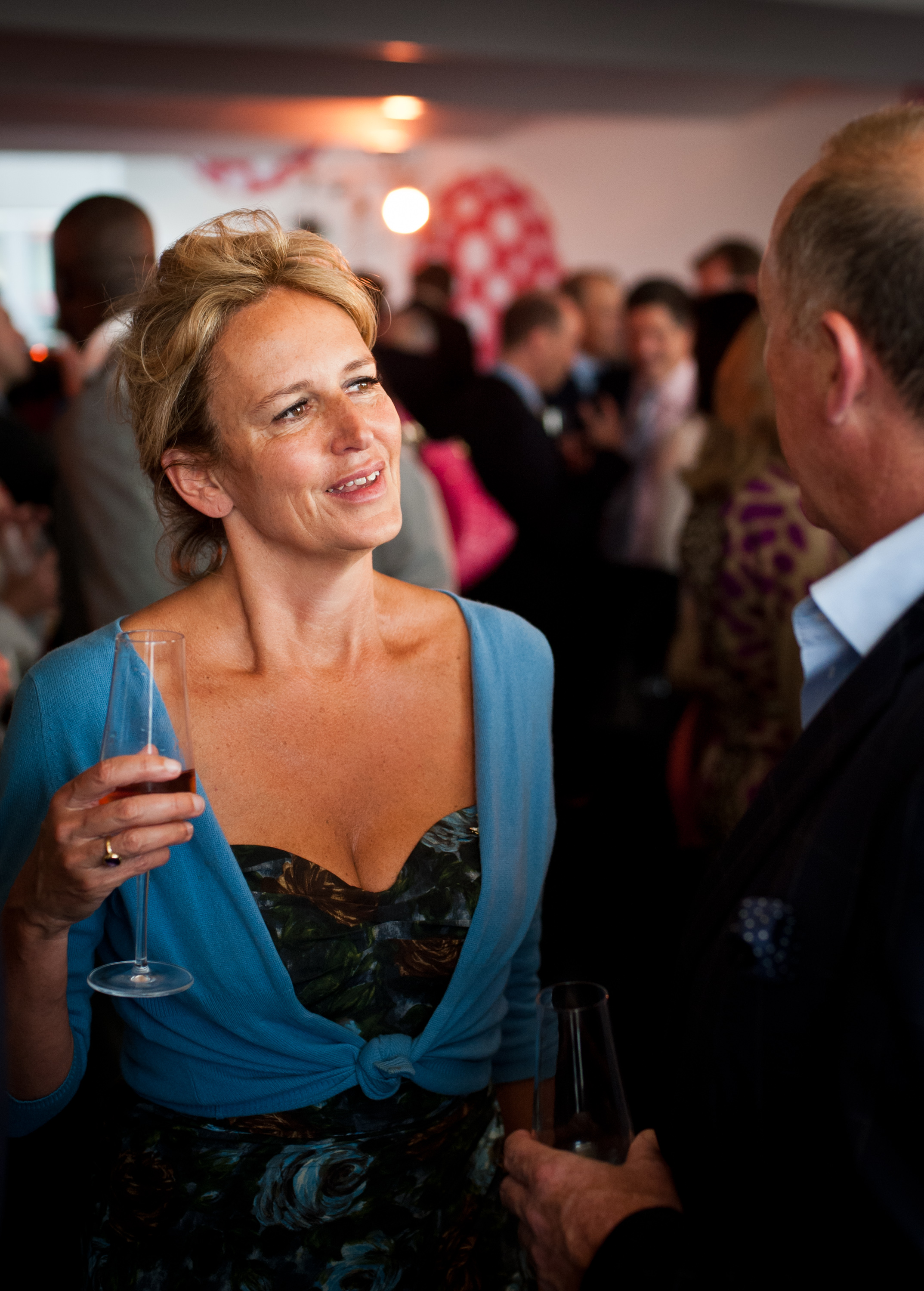
- Caroline Michel in 2013
- Born: Caroline Jayne Michel; 4 April 1959 (age 67); Harrogate, Yorkshire, England
- Education: University of Edinburgh (MA)
- Occupations: Literary agent, CEO Peters Fraser & Dunlop
- Spouse: Matthew, Baron Evans of Temple Guiting (1991–2016)
- Children: 3
- Relatives: John Cryer

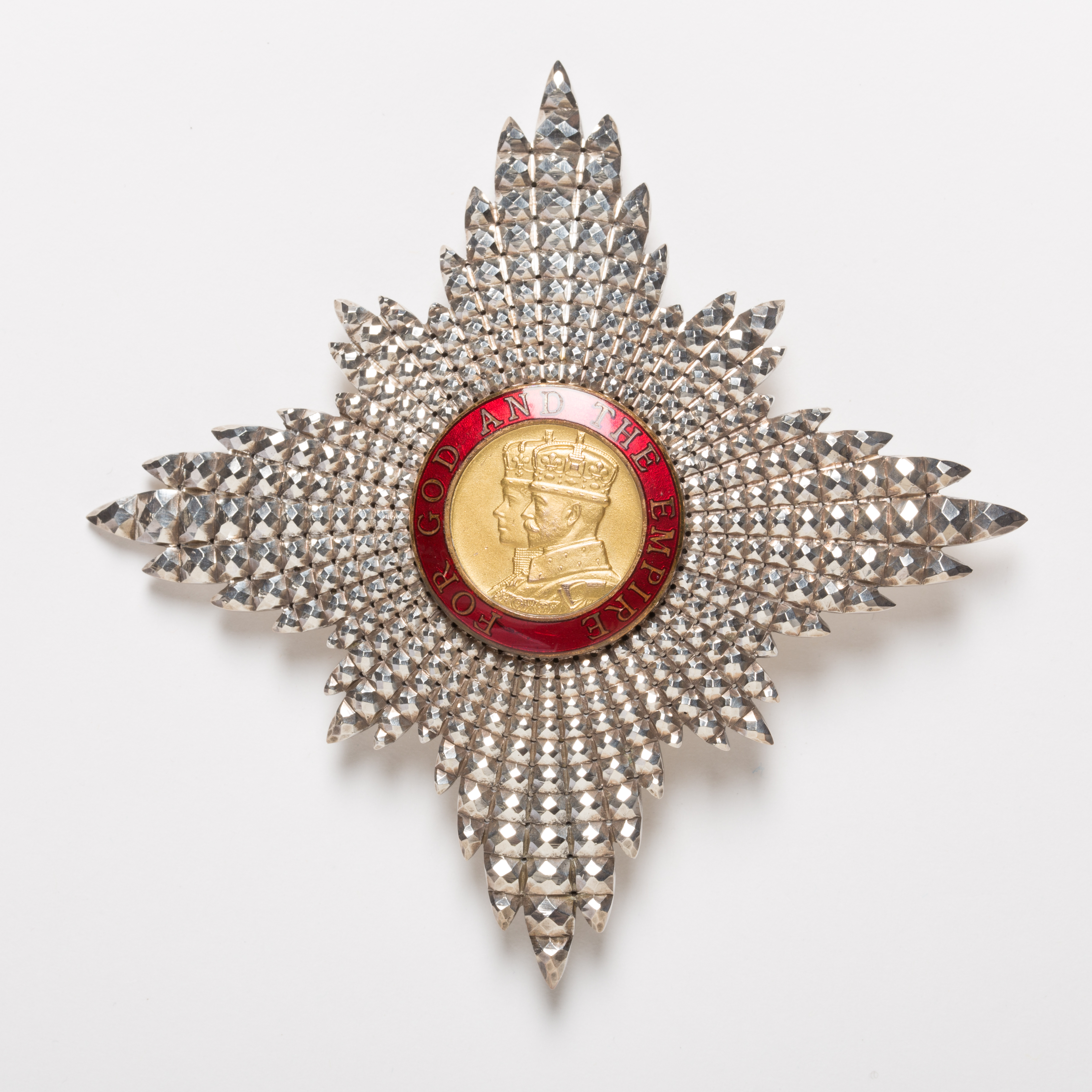
DBE breast star

Caroline Jayne Michel DBE FRSA (born 4 April 1959) is a British literary agent who, since 2015, chairs the Hay Festival.

== Early life and education ==
Michel is the daughter of Austro-Hungarian émigré Wolfgang Richard Max Michel (1928–2012) and Valerie Gilbert Fooks née Cryer (b. 1934). She attended Oakdene School in Buckinghamshire, before studying Sanskrit at the University of Edinburgh, graduating MA.

== Career ==
Having started her career with Chatto & Windus in 1982, Michel was appointed managing director of literary magazine Granta in 1990, before joining publishers Random House (Vintage) in 1992, then HarperPress in 2001. After William Morris Agency poached her in 2005, Michel has served since 2007 as CEO of Peters Fraser & Dunlop.

A committee member of the Booker Prize Foundation (1994–2001), the Veuve Clicquot Business Woman Award Panel (2011–19), the Arts and Media Honours Committee (2017–2023) and HMG Advisory Panel on Public Library Service in England (2014–15), she was appointed Chairwoman of the British Film Institute Trust in 2011, as too of the Hay Festival of Literature and Arts in 2015. A Trustee of Somerset House (since 2013) and Vice-President of the London Library (since 2016), Michel has been elected Vice-President of the London Library and a Fellow of the Royal Society of Arts.

Lady Evans was appointed Dame Commander of the British Empire (DBE) in the 2025 New Year Honours for "services to publishing and literature".

== Personal life ==
In 1991, Michel married, as his second wife, Matthew Evans (later Baron Evans of Temple Guiting), with whom she had three children. Lord Evans died in 2016.

As of 2025, Lady Evans lives in London.

== See also ==
- Lord Evans of Temple Guiting
- Hay Festival
