= Georgia de Chamberet =

Editor, translator and cultural journalist

Georgia de Chamberet is an editor, translator, cultural journalist and former book publisher. She has translated a number of non-fiction books into English by the Dalai Lama, Louis Saha, Gérard Garouste as well as by novelist Olivier Guez. In 1997, De Chamberet founded BookBlast Ltd to showcase new or overlooked writers.

== Biography ==
Born in Paris, France, her mother was Gael Elton Mayo, the youngest daughter of George Elton Mayo, and her father was French.

From 1988 to 1996, de Chamberet worked as a Senior Editor at Quartet Books publishing works by authors such as Tahar Ben Jelloun, Daniel Pennac, Annie Ernaux, Rachid Mimouni, Elsa Gress and The Death of Napoleon by Simon Leys (the pen name of Pierre Ryckmans).

De Chamberet founded BookBlast Ltd in 1997 a London-based writing agency to showcase new or overlooked writers. Early publications included Empire Windrush: Fifty Years of Writing About Black Britain, edited by Onyekachi Wambu and XCiTés: The Flamingo Book of New French Writing. De Chamberet was one of the original founder-members of English PEN’s Writers in Translation committee. The BookBlast 10x10 Tour in association with Waterstones was held in Autumn 2018.

De Chamberet is the literary executor of her godmother, the historian and traveller Lesley Blanch (1904-2007). She edited Blanch's memoirs, On the Wilder Shores of Love: A Bohemian Life, first published in 2015 by Virago, London, and La Table Ronde, Paris in 2018. The title is taken from Blanch's best known book, The Wilder Shores of Love, published in 1954. Chamberet spoke at the Oxford Literature Festival in 2015 with Philip Mansel about her experience of editing the memoir, and referenced a reissued earlier memoir Journey into the Mind's Eye. A collection of Blanch's early journalism, biographical essays and travellers’ tales, Far To Go and Many To Love: People and Places was published by Quartet Books in 2017.

De Chamberet wrote a series of articles about French counterculture for 3:AM Magazine: Paris is Burning, Beauty Victims, Paris is Burning ii and Paris is Burning iii. She was a columnist and reviewer for Words Without Borders (2006–2010) and interviewed the travel writer, memoirist, journalist, Duncan Fallowell for Prospect Magazine.

In 2018, de Chamberet was a judge for the Saif Ghobash Banipal Prize for Arabic Literary Translation, alongside Pete Ayrton, Fadia Faqir and Sophia Vasalou.

== Translations ==
- Thinking Inside the Box by Louis Saha (Vision Sports, 2012) ISBN 9781907637537
- A Call for Revolution by The Dalai Lama (Rider, 2018) ISBN 9781846045899
- The Disappearance of Josef Mengele: A Novel by Olivier Guez (Verso, 2020) ISBN 9781788735889
- A Restless Man: Portrait of the Artist as a Son, a Madman by Gérard Garouste (Daniel Templon, 2021) ISBN 978-2-917515-38-9
