= Margaret Mackie Morrison =

British novelist

Margaret Mackie Morrison (18 April 1897 – 7 February 1973); known as Peggy Morrison, and the pen name March Cost, was a British novelist. She was one of the six children of Arthur Mackie Morrison and Agnes Brysson Morrison C.B.E., née Inglis.

Hers was a literary family: one brother T. J. Morrison, was a novelist and screenwriter, another brother, John, a novelist and poet; her sister Mary a short‐story writer; and her other sister Nancy Brysson Morrison, a novelist and biographer.

== Early life ==
Born in Glasgow, after studying at the Glasgow School of Art, Morrison went on to study drama, and joined the company of Sir Frank and Lady Benson. Ill-health forced her from the stage, and after extensive travel on the continent she began to write.

== Literary career ==
Morrison achieved international acclaim in 1932 with the publication, under her pen name March Cost, of her first novel A Man Named Luke.

In 1939, she began work on her monumental biographical novel about the great French nineteenth century actress Rachel. She wrote most of it during the London Blitz, and was forced to move from both a gutted flat and bombed house with her manuscript and research books in a battered suitcase.

Further biographical novels followed, including of Aimée du Buc de Rivéry, a first cousin of the Empress Josephine, who was rumoured to have been the same person as Nakşidil Sultan who married the Sultan of Turkey; and of the 18th‐century mystic Emanuel Swedenborg.

== Personal life ==
A spinster, Morrison was a Presbyterian and member of the Church of Scotland, her family being of Covenanters stock. She later resided at Tunbridge Wells, where she died following a long illness.

== Works ==
- Cosy Chair Stories – fairytales (as 'Peggy Morrison')
- The Oldest Wish – short stories
- A Man Named Luke (1932)
- The Dark Glass
- The Dark Star (1939)
- Rachel: An Interpretation (1949); reprinted as "I, Rachel" (1957)
- The Bespoken Mile
- “The Hour Awaits (1952)
- Invitation From Minerva
- By the Angel, Islington (In the United States: The Unknown Angel)
- Her Grace Presents
- A Woman of Letters
- The Interpreter
- The Countess
- The Year of the Yield
- After the Festival
- Jubilee of a Ghost
- The Veiled Sultan
- Two guests for Swedenborg
- A Key to Laurels
