= The Wilder Shores of Love =

- Author: Lesley Blanch
- Language: English
- Publication date: 1954

The Wilder Shores of Love is a work of non-fiction by travel writer Lesley Blanch. It was first published in 1954. It is a colourful account of four women – Isabel Burton, Jane Digby, Aimée du Buc de Rivéry and Isabelle Eberhardt – who left Europe to live in the Middle East.

The title of the novel inspired subsequent works. A book of her travel writings entitled From Wilder Shores: The Tables of My Travels was published in 1989, and her memoirs, edited by Georgia de Chamberet, were published posthumously by Virago and titled Lesley Blanch: On the Wilder Shores of Love.
