= Gerald de Gaury =

British military officer, Arabist, explorer, historian and diplomat

Gerald Simpson Hillairet Rutland Vere de Gaury MC (1 April 1897 – 12 January 1984) was a British military officer, Arabist, explorer, historian and diplomat.

He served in the Hampshire Regiment in the First World War, where he fought at the Somme, and was wounded on several occasions, including in the Gallipoli Campaign. He was awarded the Military Cross in 1917:

"For conspicuous gallantry and devotion to duty. He displayed the greatest gallantry and initiative in organising and leading bombing attacks. Although subjected to heavy machine gun and rifle fire he captured an important enemy post. His fine example and disregard of danger were of great value to his men."

De Gaury served as the British political agent in Kuwait in the 1930s, and organized and took part in the official visit of Sir Andrew Ryan to Riyadh in November 1935, to present Ibn Sa'ud with the Order of the Bath. The previous year, while visiting Ibn Sa'ud in Riyadh, he had become one of the first half dozen Britons to enter that city.

He was a fluent speaker of Arabic and spent much time hunting with Ibn Sa'ud during his wartime assignment to the Nejd and Asir. During that time, he became a foremost authority on the region and wrote a number of books on the subject in later life.

De Gaury was an avid photographer and painter, with many photos of the Arabian Peninsula coming from him. He also very frequently painted with water colors of landscapes from his journeys.

He was a close friend of Freya Stark and Lesley Blanch, who said of him:

"He spoke beautiful Arabic, and could talk Arabic lore. Living among, and as one of, the royal household in Arabia, he knew a great deal and could tell you marvellous legends."

For the last twenty years of his life he lived in Sussex Square, Brighton, where he died on 12 January 1984.

== Works ==
- Arabian Journeys and Other Desert Travels, (1950)
- Arabia Phoenix, (Kegan Paul, 1946). ISBN 0-7103-0677-6
- Faisal, King of Saudi Arabia, (Praeger, 1967). ASIN B0007DUTRE
- The New State of Israel, (Verschoyle, 1952)
- Rulers of Mecca, (AMS Press, 1954). ISBN 978-0-404-16517-8
- Three Kings in Baghdad: The Tragedy of Iraq's Monarchy, (I. B. Tauris, 2008). ISBN 978-1-84511-535-7
- The Grand Captain, Gonzalo De Cordoba, (Longmans Green, 1955)
