= Matthew Evans, Baron Evans of Temple Guiting =

British Labour Party politician

The Right Honourable The Lord Evans of Temple Guiting CBE FRSA
- Lord Evans in 2011

Lord-in-waiting Government Whip
- In office 13 June 2003 – 27 June 2007
- Prime Minister: Tony Blair
- Preceded by: The Lord Davies of Oldham
- Succeeded by: The Lord Truscott

Member of the House of Lords
- Lord Temporal
- Life peerage 11 May 2000 – 6 July 2016

Personal details
- Born: 7 August 1941
- Died: 6 July 2016 (aged 74)
- Party: Labour
- Spouse(s): Elizabeth Mead (m. 1966; div. 1991) Caroline Michel (m. 1991)
- Children: 5
- Parent(s): George Evans; Florence Knappett
- Education: London School of Economics
- Occupation: Politician, book publisher
- Awards: CBE (1998)

Matthew Evans, Baron Evans of Temple Guiting, CBE, FRSA (7 August 1941 – 6 July 2016), was a British Labour Party politician. Evans' father was the writer George Ewart Evans.

== Background and career ==
The son of George Ewart Evans and Florence Ellen Knappett, he was educated at Friends' School, Saffron Walden, Essex, before reading Economics at the London School of Economics, graduating B.Sc.Econ. He initially worked as a bookseller before at the age of 23 joining the publisher Faber and Faber, where by the age of 30 he had risen to become the company's managing director (1971–73) and subsequently chairman. He became a Fellow of the Royal Society of Arts (FRSA) in 1990. Evans also served as a governor of the British Film Institute and in 1999 was appointed the first chairman of the Museums, Libraries and Archives Council.

Appointed a Commander of the Order of the British Empire (CBE) in the 1998 Birthday Honours, Evans was created a Life Peer on 11 May 2000 as Baron Evans of Temple Guiting, of Temple Guiting in the County of Gloucestershire. In the House of Lords, he served as a Government Whip from 2002 to 2007, and a Spokesman for the Department for Constitutional Affairs from 2003. Also a Spokesman for the Office of the Deputy Prime Minister, the Department of Trade and Industry, the Department for Work and Pensions, and the Treasury, Lord Evans left the Government in October 2007 to join Swiss Bank EFG International.

== Personal life ==
Evans married Elizabeth Mead in 1966 divorcing in 1991 when he married literary agent Caroline Michel, with whom he remained until their separation in 2010. He had two sons by his first wife, and two sons and a daughter by his second wife.

Lord Evans died on the morning of 6 July 2016 after a long illness.
