= Crier (surname) =

Crier is a surname. Notable people with the surname include:

- Arthur Crier, part of the band The Halos
- Catherine Crier (born 1954), American television anchor
- Gordon Crier (1912–1984), Scottish writer/producer
- Keith Crier, part of the band GQ

== See also ==
- Cryer
