= Ziggy (comic strip) =

American comic strip by Tom Wilson

- Ziggy and his dog Fuzz
- Author(s): Tom Wilson (1971–1987); Tom Wilson II (1987–present)
- Website: www.ziggy.com
- Current status/schedule: Current daily strip
- Launch date: 1968 (syndication) June 27, 1972; 54 years ago
- Syndicate(s): Universal Press Syndicate/Universal Uclick/Andrews McMeel Syndication
- Publisher: Andrews McMeel Publishing
- Genre(s): Humor, gag cartoon, gag-a-day

Ziggy is an American cartoon series about an eponymous character who suffers an endless stream of misfortunes and sad but sympathetic daily events. It was created by Tom Wilson, a former American Greetings executive, and distributed by Andrews McMeel Syndication. In 1987, his son Tom Wilson II took over writing and drawing the comic strip.

== History ==
Ziggy, nameless at his conception, has been visible in some form or another since the mid-1960s. Greeting card writer Tom Wilson first drew a Ziggy-like character as an elevator operator offering political commentary in editorial cartoons, but no one would syndicate his work. Ziggy eventually appeared in an American Greetings gift book, When You're Not Around (1968) which caught the eye of Kathleen Andrews, a founder of the fledgling startup Universal Press Syndicate, which badly needed a popular comic to keep it afloat. A deal was struck, the name was given, and Ziggy was born. The strip began in 15 newspapers in June 1971, and that number eventually grew to over 600 publications. A Sunday strip premiered on April 1, 1973.

In 1987, after years of preparation, the strip was taken over by Tom Wilson's son, Tom Wilson II.

Tom Wilson I died on September 16, 2011, at the age of 80. As of 2026, his son continues to produce the strip.

== Ziggy's traits ==
Ziggy, the constantly unfortunate but sympathetic protagonist, is a diminutive, bald, barefoot, almost featureless character (save for his large nose). He is often drawn in just his shirt with no pants on, though the lower half of his torso is never seen. He lives in a simple house with a garden, and he is often seen working at an office job, at which his foibles often reflect the absurdities that many readers encounter on a daily basis.

On the name Ziggy, Tom Wilson II noted:

The name Ziggy derived from his father's school experience of being the last alphabetically. When a new classmate arrived with a last name beginning with "Z", the idea took root with the friendly sounding "y" ending, such as Billy or Tommy. "Ziggy is a last-in-line character", the son said in a phone interview. "The last picked for everything and kind of a lovable kind of loser character".

Ziggy is seen throughout the years as an animal lover, and he is the owner of a number of pets, including a dog (Fuzz), a cat (Sid), a parrot (Josh), and a duck (Wack) all of whom seem to possess some anthropomorphic qualities. For example, in a strip written in the 2000s, his pet fish Goldie and his pet cat expressed noticeable displeasure with their owner because he told them that he ate catfish for dinner the night before. Despite them often playing a part in Ziggy's mishaps and misadventures, the love and affection he gives to and receives from his animals is often very different than his interactions with the various human beings he encounters during his days. Tom Wilson often juxtaposed Ziggy's human interactions with his animal interactions for comedic and emotional effect.

One of the great appeals of the comic strip is how Ziggy himself deals with the endless stream of misfortunes which befall him on a daily basis. The character is frequently depicted in surreal or arbitrary situations that allow the reader to relate to Ziggy's misfortunes and his take on life. For comedic effect, the strip often mines typical comic strip pop culture territory, such as computers, dating, office relationships, pet ownership, customer service, and many of the other perils of modern life. Since the strip has been in existence for 50 years, Ziggy has experienced the waves of societal and technological change that have swept through our culture in the last five decades. For instance, early strips show him using rotary phones, while strips put out in recent years displays Ziggy's adoption of modern technology like cell phones and flat screen TVs.

== In other media ==
In 1982, Ziggy's Gift, an animated Christmas television special, aired on ABC. The special was directed by Richard Williams, and contained the song "Give, Love, Joy" by Harry Nilsson. It won the 1983 Emmy Award for Outstanding Animated Program, and was re-released on DVD in 2005. The following year, Williams also created a series of short vignettes featuring Ziggy. While Ziggy was silent in Ziggy's Gift, he was voiced by Will Ryan in the vignettes.

In 2002, Ziggy became the official spokescharacter for the Leukemia and Lymphoma Society.
