= Janet Wallach =

American writer (born 1942)

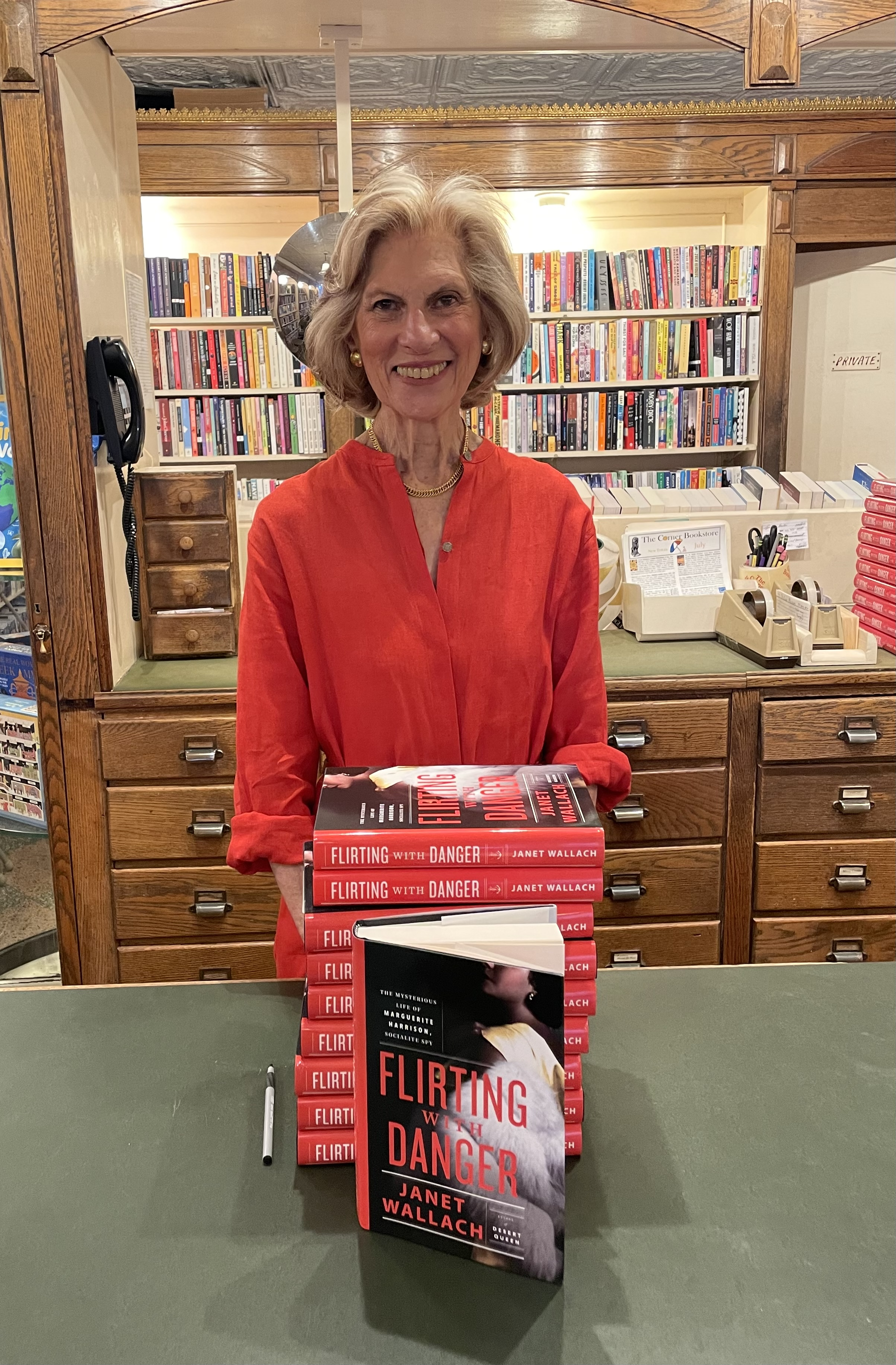
A picture of the author at the launch of her latest book, Flirting with Danger, at the Corner Bookstore.

Janet Wallach (born May 4, 1942 Brooklyn) is an American writer. She is President Emerita of Seeds of Peace.

== Early life and education ==
Wallach was born in New York City and attended New York University.

== Career ==
Janet Wallach has written about accomplished but under-recognized, women throughout history and across the world. As a contributor to The Washington Post Magazine, Smithsonian Magazine, and other magazines, she wrote profiles and cover stories on subjects including Queen Noor of Jordan and Iraqi Ambassador Nizar Hamdoon.

Her book, Desert Queen; The Extraordinary Life of Gertrude Bell (1996), has been named by The New York Times as a notable book of the year and translated into twelve languages. Her other books include Chanel: Her Style and Her Life (1998), Seraglio: A Novel (2003), and The Richest Woman in America: Hetty Green in the Gilded Age (2012). She co-authored, with her husband John Wallach, Arafat: In the Eyes of the Beholder, a biography of Yasser Arafat; The New Palestinians, a look at the leading figures in the West Bank and Gaza; and Still Small Voices, the personal stories of ten Israelis and Palestinians during the first intifada. Most recently, she released Flirting with Danger (2023), which chronicles the life of American spy Marguerite Harrison.

== Works ==
- Desert Queen. Nan A. Talese. 1996. ISBN 978-0-385-47408-5.
- Chanel. Nan A. Talese. 1998. ISBN 978-0-385-48872-3.
- The Richest Woman in America. Anchor. 2013. ISBN 978-0-307-47457-5.
- Flirting with Danger. Doubleday Books. 2023. ISBN 978-0-385-54508-2.

== Seeds of Peace ==
Janet Wallach is a founding director and President Emerita of Seeds of Peace, which brings together outstanding teenagers from regions in conflict - which includes Indians and Pakistanis and Americans of diverse backgrounds.
