= Mariemont Players =

Founded in 1936, Mariemont Players is a community theatre company in Cincinnati, Ohio. Mariemont Players, Inc. (MPI) which were organized in 1960 stages 6 new performances including comedies, musicals, challenging mysteries and dramas a year.
