= Ziggy's Gift =

- Based on: Ziggy comics
- Written by: Tom Wilson
- Directed by: Richard Williams
- Music by: Harry Nilsson; Perry Botkin Jr.
- Country of origin: United States
- Original language: English

Production
- Producer: Richard Williams
- Running time: 24 minutes
- Production companies: Welcome Productions, in association with Universal Press Syndicate

Original release
- Network: ABC
- Release: December 1, 1982

Ziggy's Gift is a 1982 American animated holiday television special based on the Ziggy comics. Directed by Richard Williams, the special first aired on December 1, 1982, on ABC.

== Premise ==
Ziggy takes a job as a street Santa to raise money for the poor, accompanied by his faithful dog Fuzz. Surrounded by crooked Santas, sneaky thieves, and a suspicious cop, Ziggy remains honest and kind (while speaking no dialogue).

== Production ==
Written by Ziggy cartoonist Tom Wilson, the special includes animation by Eric Goldberg and Tom Sito. The original song "Give, Love, Joy" was composed by Harry Nilsson.

== Accolades ==
Ziggy's Gift won the 1983 Emmy Award for Outstanding Animated Program.

== See also ==
- List of Christmas films
