= Pearn, Pollinger & Higham =

Literary agency based in London, England

Pearn, Pollinger & Higham (Ltd) was an English firm of literary agents based in London during the early twentieth century. They were agents for Graham Greene, Paul Scott and James Herriot, among others.

== History ==
The three founders, Nancy Pearn, Laurence Pollinger and David Higham, all worked at the Curtis Brown agency after the First World War. When Curtis Brown's founder Albert Curtis Brown brought in his son to run the company, Pearn, Pollinger & Higham was created, with the help of a loan from Harold Macmillan, among others. The company began trading in 1935, and continued as such until 1956, when it was renamed David Higham Associates following the death of Nancy Pearn and the departure of Laurence Pollinger.
