= Tom Wilson (cartoonist) =

American cartoonist

- Born: August 1, 1931 Uniontown, Pennsylvania, U.S.
- Died: September 16, 2011 (aged 80) Cincinnati, Ohio, U.S.
- Areas: Cartoonist, Writer, Artist
- Notable works: Ziggy
- Awards: Emmy (producer, Outstanding Animated Program) for Ziggy's Gift (1982); Purchase award, Butler Museum National Painting Competition
- Spouse: Carol Sobble
- Children: two sons, two daughters

Thomas Albert Wilson (August 1, 1931 – September 16, 2011), was an American cartoonist. Wilson was the creator of the comic strip Ziggy, which he drew from 1971 to 1987. The strip was then continued by his son, Tom Wilson Jr.

After growing up in Uniontown, Pennsylvania, Wilson served in the U.S. Army from 1953 to 1955. He attended the Art Institute of Pittsburgh, graduating in 1955. He was a Cooper Union art instructor from 1961 to 1962.

Wilson's career began in 1950, doing advertisement layouts for Uniontown Newspapers, Inc. In 1955, he joined American Greetings (AG) as a designer, becoming Creative Director in 1957 and vice-president of creative development in 1978. While at AG, he developed the Soft Touch greeting card line. He also served as president of Those Characters From Cleveland, AG's character licensing subsidiary.

== Ziggy ==
The Ziggy comics panel, syndicated by Universal Press Syndicate, launched in 15 newspapers in June 1971. It expanded to appear in more than 500 daily and Sunday newspapers and has been featured in bestselling books and calendars. Ziggy merchandising has included plaques, T-shirts, buttons, glass tumblers, lunch boxes, coffee mugs and greeting cards. In 2002, Ziggy became the official spokescharacter for the Leukemia and Lymphoma Society.

Throughout his career, Wilson demonstrated a remarkable ability to anticipate future trends in the marketplace. A veteran of the licensing business, Wilson headed up the creative team that developed such character licensing blockbusters as Strawberry Shortcake and Care Bears.

In 1987, Wilson's son, Tom Wilson Jr., took over the Ziggy cartoon after having served as an assistant on the strip for many years. Even though Tom Sr. lived in Cleveland and Tom Jr. lived in Cincinnati, the two worked as a team, collaborating by fax and phone.

Wilson was a talented painter with works appearing in exhibitions throughout the United States, including the Cleveland Museum of Art and the Society of Illustrators annual show in New York.

== Awards ==
The 1982 Christmas special Ziggy's Gift, based on a Ziggy story by Wilson, won a 1983 Emmy Award for Outstanding Animated Program.

He received the Purchase award in the Butler Institute of American Art's annual exhibition.

Wilson was a survivor of lung cancer.

== Death ==
He died in his sleep on the night of September 16, 2011, of pneumonia at a Cincinnati hospital. He was 80.
