= Cryer =

Cryer is a surname. Notable people with the surname include:

- Ann Cryer JP (born 1939), British Labour Party politician, Member of Parliament for Keighley from 1997 to 2010
- Barry Cryer OBE (1935–2022), British writer and comedian
- Bob Cryer (1934–1994), politician in the United Kingdom
- David Cryer (born 1936), veteran American stage, television, and film actor and singer
- George E. Cryer (1875–1961), American lawyer and politician
- Gretchen Cryer (born 1935), American playwright, lyricist and actress
- John Cryer (born 1964), English Labour Party politician, Member of Parliament for Leyton and Wanstead since 2010
- Jon Cryer (born 1965), American actor, screenwriter, and film producer
- Justin Cryer (born 2005), American football player
- LJ Cryer (born 2001), American basketball player
- Max Cryer MBE (1935–2021), New Zealand television producer, broadcaster, entertainment producer, singer, cabaret performer and author
- Rebecca Cryer (1946–2020), Oklahoma attorney, tribal officer and judge
- Sherwood Cryer (1927–2009), businessman from Texas
- Suzanne Cryer (born 1967), American actress known for her role as Ashley on the ABC sitcom Two Guys and a Girl
- Tom Cryer (1949–2012), attorney accused of failing to file U.S. federal income tax returns in a timely fashion

== See also ==
- Crier (surname)
