= Night School: The Web Series =

British web series

- Genre: Teen drama
- Created by: CJ Daugherty; Jack Jewers
- Written by: CJ Daugherty; Jack Jewers
- Directed by: Jack Jewers
- Starring: Jessica Sargent; Campbell Challis; Danny Carmel; Grace Parry; Jodie Hirst; Damien Thomas; Lewis Lilley; Jessica Swallow; Kunjue Li; Louis Clarke-Clare; Tom Blount
- Country of origin: United Kingdom
- Original language: English
- No. of seasons: 1
- No. of episodes: 6

Production
- Executive producer: CJ Daugherty
- Producer: Jack Jewers

Night School: The Web Series is a British web series based on the Night School novels by CJ Daugherty. It was the first ever web series based on a British young adult book. The show premiered on YouTube on 12 December 2014. The series was written and created by CJ Daugherty and Jack Jewers.

== Series overview ==
The series follows Allie Sheridan a 16-year-old girl from Brixton who is sent away to boarding school after a string of arrests. But the school isn't all it seems. Cimmeria Academy is an exclusive private school for the children of the elite. At the heart of Cimmeria is Night School, a Bullingdon Club style secret society whose members are both destined to run the country and mentored by the world’s most powerful people. But Allie soon learns that their glamorous and exciting world is laced with deception and danger. Everyone lies and everyone hides secrets. Secrets that can kill.

Though set within the world of the Night School novels, the web series presents new stories featuring the characters, rather than a straight adaptation of the books.

== Cast and characters ==
=== Main cast ===
- Jessica Sargent as Allie Sheridan
- Campbell Challis as Carter West
- Sarah Parker as Ashley Haywer
- Danny Carmel as Nathaniel St. John
- Grace Parry as Katie Gilmore
- Jodie Hirst as Jo Arringford
- Damien Thomas as Jeremy Simpson
- Lewis Lilley as Mark Lacey
- Jessica Swallow as Eleanor Crawley
- Kunjue Li as Lucy Li
- Louis Clarke-Clare as Sylvain Cassell
- Rinna Reyes as Kaylee Sawyer

== Production ==
The project was announced in October 2014. Filming took place between August and November 2014 in the south of England, with principal locations including Frensham Heights School near Farnham, Surrey.

== Episodes ==
No.	Title	Directed by	Written by	Original release date
1	"Flashback"	Jack Jewers	CJ Daugherty & Jack Jewers	12 December 2014
The pilot episode begins with Allie and a junior student, Eleanor Crawley, walking across the beautiful and serene grounds of a private boarding school. Eleanor is eagerly asking about her background and how she ended up here. In flashback we see Allie as she was a year ago, in thick makeup and jeans with her heavily pierced friend Mark. Together they trash their inner London school, spray painting the walls, destroying a classroom, until they are finally arrested. Flash forward again. Her criminal past only makes Allie even more of a rock star in Eleanor's eyes. As the girls enter the school, we see the enormous gothic edifice of Cimmeria Academy for the first time.
2	"The Other One"	Jack Jewers	CJ Daugherty	19 December 2014
In this episode we're introduced to brooding heart-throb Carter West. He got the girl, then he lost the girl again to French rival Sylvain Cassel. Now Carter explains just how he blew it with Allie. How sorry he is about it. And how he'd give anything for just one more chance.
3	"Power"	Jack Jewers	CJ Daugherty	26 December 2014
Ruthless Nathaniel St John has only given one interview in his life. It was this one. In Parliament, where a TV crew comes to meet him. The questions grow increasingly hostile as the interviewer realises what Nathaniel is telling him – that the government isn't really in charge of the country. People like him are...
4	"The Gilmore Girl"	Jack Jewers	CJ Daugherty	2 January 2015
In this episode, mean girl Katie Gilmore gets to tell her side of the story. Why she hated Allie. And why she 'gave up the mean girl act and joined the good guys.'
5	"All the Pretty Killers"	Jack Jewers	CJ Daugherty	9 January 2015
In this episode, Allie dreams of her lost best friend, Jo Arringford. Allie gets to ask her the questions she longs to know the answers to: 'Does it hurt?' 'Are you happy?' But the dream turns into a nightmare... As it does every time...
6	"Bang"	Jack Jewers	CJ Daugherty	16 January 2015
In the season finale, Allie explains why she's so angry. Meanwhile, the forces of evil are stirring...

== Reception ==
Night School was covered widely in the UK media on its release, with some international coverage too. The response was positive. The Guardian ran a front page story on the series and hosted the first episode. The US-based Daily Dot headlined their coverage "Start watching 'Night School' if you want to keep up with the tweens in your life" and described the series as "a heads-up as to what your younger sister or daughter will be talking about in a few weeks." Teen publications such as Maximum Pop!, Sugarscape, and Top of the Pops covered the series extensively, with positive reviews.

The US-based Indie Series Network (originators of the Indie Soap Awards) named Night School the best web series in the world in its weekly poll of independently-produced web series three times, for Power, All the Pretty Killers, and Bang, and nominated a fourth time for The Gilmore Girl. The same polls named Danny Carmel best actor; and Jodie Hirst and Jessica Sargent best actress.

The series had extensive coverage in the regional UK media, including the Eastern Daily Press, the Southern Daily Echo, Get Surrey, the Bournemouth Daily Echo, and the Belfast Telegraph. BBC Radio and London Live broadcast news features and interviews about the series.

Night School was an official selection at the Marseille Web Fest, NYC Web Fest, Washington D.C. Web Fest, and Dublin Web Fest. In February 2016, Night School was nominated for five awards at the Indie Series Awards in Los Angeles.
