= The Favorite (1989 film) =

1989 film by Jack Smight

The Favorite (Intimate Power)
- Directed by: Jack Smight
- Written by: Prince Michael of Greece (novel); Larry Yust (screenplay)
- Produced by: Georges-Alain Vuille; Ascona Films Inc.
- Starring: F. Murray Abraham; Maud Adams; Francesco Quinn; Amber O'Shea
- Cinematography: Giorgio Tonti; Howard Wexler
- Edited by: Dennis Virkler; Devon Heffley Curry, adr supervisor
- Music by: William Goldstein
- Distributed by: 20th Century Fox
- Release date: 9 August 1989 (France)
- Running time: 104 min.
- Countries: United States; Switzerland
- Language: English

The Favorite (also titled Intimate Power) is a 1989 Swiss-American historical drama film based on the unsubstantiated story of Aimée du Buc de Rivéry that takes place at the dawn of the 19th century. It was the final film of director Jack Smight.

== Premise ==
A young French woman named Aimée is kidnapped and taken to the Ottoman Empire, where she is forced into a sultan's harem. Fiercely independent, she resists at first, but ultimately realises that she must make choices in order to survive. She begins to influence the Sultan to adopt fairer methods of resolving conflicts, but finds herself at odds with another of his wives who wants her son, Mustafa, to become the new Sultan. Over the years, she must deal with the advances of the new Sultan while protecting her adopted son, Mahmud, and helping the Ottoman Empire against Russian Empire in the Russo-Turkish War of 1787–1792.

The source for the story is a novel by Prince Michael of Greece and Denmark titled Sultana - La Nuit du Serail.

== Cast ==
- F. Murray Abraham as Abdul Hamid
- Maud Adams as Sineperver
- Amber O'Shea as Aimée Dubucq de Rivéry
- Ron Dortch as Tulip
- James Michael Gregary as Selim
- Laurent Le Doyen as Sebastiani
- Francesco Quinn as adult Mahmud
- Andréa Parisy as Mihrişah
- Tom McGreevey as Uncle (as Thomas McGreevey)
- Celeste Simpson-Boyd as Zinah
- Robere Kazadi as Orchid
- Garth Wilton as British Consul
- Reuven Bar-Yotam as Algerian Captain
- Faruk Peker as Baktar
- John Kennedy Hayden as Chief Janissary
- Mike Johnson as First Mate
- Thomas Rosales Jr. as Third Mate
- Michael Saad as Jeweler
- Dale Dye as French Officer
- Joseph Darrell as Manservant
- Ayse Gungor as Harem Girl
- Starr Andreeff as Harem Girl
- Erica Zeitlin as Harem Girl
- Victoria Dakil as Old Woman
- Roz Witt as Nun
- George Marshall Ruge as Kamir
- Joe El Rady as Boy at the bazar
- Jonathan Vuille as Young Mahmud
- Glenn Scarpelli as Mustafa

== Production ==
- Director: Jack Smight
- Production Company: Ascona Films, Inc.

The film was shot in Turkey. Halfway through the production, original producer Georges-Alain Vuille ran out of money and Steve Friedman's company completed production. Smight finished the film, stating "it turned out better than expected, but once again 'into oblivion'."

== Sources ==
- Jason Ankeny, Allmovie.
- The Favorite at IMDb
