= Lesley Blanch =

British writer and traveller (1904–2007)

Lesley Blanch MBE FRSL
- Born: 6 June 1904; Chiswick, England
- Died: 7 May 2007 (aged 102); Menton, France
- Occupation: Writer
- Writing career
- Notable works: The Wilder Shores of Love (1954); The Sabres of Paradise (1960)

Lesley Blanch (6 June 1904 – 7 May 2007) was a British writer and traveller. She is best known for The Wilder Shores of Love, about Isabel Burton (who married the Arabist and explorer Richard), Jane Digby el-Mezrab (Lady Ellenborough, the society beauty who ended up living in the Syrian desert with a Bedouin chieftain), Aimée du Buc de Rivéry (a French convent woman captured by pirates and sent to the Sultan's harem in Istanbul), and Isabelle Eberhardt (a Swiss linguist who felt most comfortable in boy's clothes and lived among the Arabs in the Sahara).

== Life and career ==
Blanch was born in Chiswick, on 6 June 1904. She attended St. Paul's Girls' School, Hammersmith, from 1915 to 1921, went on to study at the Slade School of Art, and began her career as a scenery designer and book illustrator. In 1930 she married Robert Alan Wimberley Bicknell after an affair which may have produced a daughter, subsequently adopted. She divorced Bicknell in about 1940. Between 1937 and 1944, she was features editor of the UK edition of Vogue.

In April 1945, she married the French novelist-diplomat Romain Gary. Life in the French diplomatic service took them to the Balkans, Turkey, North Africa, Mexico and the United States. In the United States, they were associated with Aldous Huxley and with Hollywood stars such as Gary Cooper, Sophia Loren and Laurence Olivier.

Gary left her for American actress Jean Seberg. Lesley Blanch and Gary were divorced in 1963. Blanch continued to travel from her home in Paris, and saw old friends Nancy Mitford, Violet Trefusis, Rebecca West and the Windsors. She was a close friend of Gerald de Gaury, who gave her insights into Middle Eastern customs and culture. The society photographer Cecil Beaton was also a lifelong friend.

The best known of her 12 books is The Wilder Shores of Love (1954), about four women who all "followed the beckoning Eastern star." The book also inspired the American artist Cy Twombly, who named a painting after the novel.

Blanch's love of Russia, instilled in her by a friend of her parents whom she simply called The Traveller, is recounted in Journey into the Mind's Eye, Fragments of an Autobiography (1968, reissued 2018) which is part travel book, part love story. As well as awakening her to sex, he whetted her appetite with exotic tales of Siberia and Central Asia. The Traveller was possibly identified as Theodore Komisarjevsky.

Her trip to Iran and meeting Empress Farah Pahlavi in April 1975 resulted in a biography of the empress named "Farah, Shahbanou of Iran" in 1978.

Lesley Blanch considered her best book to be The Sabres of Paradise (the biography of Imam Shamyl and history of Tsarist Russian rule in early 19th century Georgia and the Caucasus).

== Awards and honours ==
A Fellow of the Royal Society of Literature, Lesley Blanch was appointed MBE in 2001, and in 2004 the French government awarded her the medal of Officier de l'Ordre des Arts et des Lettres.

== Death ==
Blanch died in Menton, on 7 May 2007, aged 102.

== Publications ==
- 1954: The Wilder Shores of Love, London: John Murray.
- 1955: Round the World in 80 Dishes: The World Through the Kitchen Window (cookbook), London: John Murray.
- 1957: The Game of Hearts: Harriette Wilson and her Memoirs (edited and introduced by Lesley Blanch), London: Gryphon Books.
- 1960: The Sabres of Paradise: Conquest and Vengeance in the Caucasus (a biography of Imam Shamyl and history of Tsarist Russian rule in early 19th century Georgia and the Caucasus), London: John Murray.
- 1963: Under a Lilac-Bleeding Star: Travels and Travellers, London: John Murray.
- 1964: Harriette Wilson's Memoirs (selected and edited by Lesley Blanch), London: Folio Society.
- 1965: The Nine Tiger Man: A Tale of Low Behaviour in High Places, London: Collins.
- 1968: Journey into the Mind's Eye: Fragments of an Autobiography, London: Collins.
- 1974: Pavilions of the Heart: The Four Walls of Love, London: Weidenfeld & Nicolson.
- 1978: Farah, Shahbanou of Iran, Queen of Persia, London: Collins.
- 1983: Pierre Loti: Portrait of an Escapist, London: Collins.
- 1989: From Wilder Shores: The Tables of My Travels (a collection of travel and food writings), London: John Murray.
- 1998: Romain, un regard particulier (traduit de l'anglais par Jean Lambert), Arles: Actes Sud.
- 2015: On the Wilder Shores of Love: A Bohemian Life (edited by Georgia de Chamberet), London: Virago.
