= CJ Daugherty =

British writer

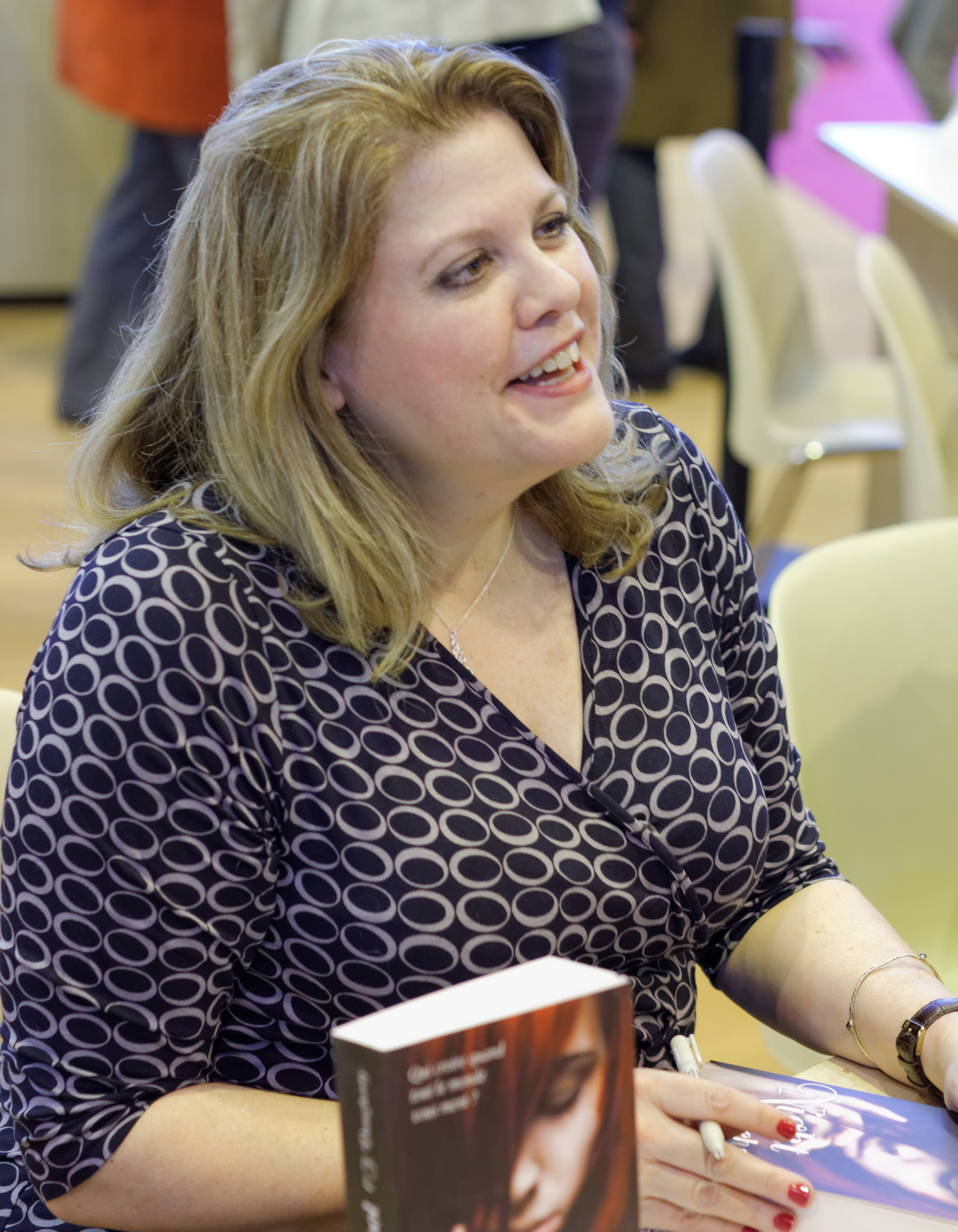
Daugherty in 2013

CJ Daugherty, also known as Christi Daugherty, is an American-born novelist based in England, known by her pen name Ava Glass. She is best known for Night School and sequels, a series of bestselling young adult romantic thrillers set in a fictional boarding school called Cimmeria Academy. She began her career as a journalist, writing for publications such as the Dallas Morning News, Reuters, and Time Out. After a brief period working for the British government, she began writing novels in 2010.

== Early life ==
Daugherty was born in Dallas, Texas. She moved to London in 2000.

== Career ==
Daugherty began her career as a journalist for TimeOut and then worked as a civil servant educating the Home Secretary's counterterrorism unit how to utilise social media.

=== Night School ===
The first book in the Night School series was published by Little, Brown in the UK in 2012. Endgame, the fifth book in the series, came out in 2015.

The Night School series has been translated into 22 languages. The series has been a bestseller in multiple countries. Night School: Resistance, the fourth book in the series, reached number two on the Spiegel Bestseller list in Germany in May 2014. It was also a number one bestseller in Poland. Night School: Fracture, the third book in the series, was number one bestselling children's book in Israel in May 2014, and a top 20 bestseller in France. In July 2019 it was announced that Night School had been optioned for television, with the producer/ director Sarah Spillane attached as showrunner.

Books in series:

- Night School (2012)
- Night School: Legacy (2013)
- Night School: Fracture (2013)
- Night School: Resistance (2014)
- Night School: Endgame (2015)

=== Night School: the Web Series ===
Night School: the Web Series, a web television series based on the Night School books, was launched in December 2014. It was the first British web series based on a young adult book and received widespread media coverage in the UK. It was also covered by international publications such as the Daily Dot.

Films in series:

- Night School: the Web Series - Episode 01 "Flashback" (2014)
- Night School: the Web Series - Episode 02 "The Other One" (2014)
- Night School: the Web Series - Episode 03 "Power" (2014)
- Night School: the Web Series - Episode 04 "The Gilmore Girl" (2015)
- Night School: the Web Series - Episode 05 "All the Pretty Killers" (2015)
- Night School: the Web Series - Episode 06 "Bang" (2015)

=== The Secret Fire ===
The Secret Fire, a young adult fantasy series co-written by CJ Daugherty and the French fantasy author Carina Rozenfeld, was published at the end of 2015 by the Little, Brown imprint, Atom Books. A sequel, The Secret City, was published in 2016.

Books in series:

- The Secret Fire (2015)
- The Secret City (2016)

=== Harper McClain ===
A series of adult crime thrillers featuring crime reporter Harper McClain, written under the author name "Christi Daugherty". Published by Minotaur Books/St. Martin's Press in the U.S. and HarperCollins in the UK.

Books in series:

- The Echo Killing (2018)
- A Beautiful Corpse (2019)
- Revolver Road (2020)

=== Number 10 ===
In April 2019 it was announced that Daugherty would be returning to YA with a new series of thrillers, the first of which will be called Number 10. Set in the same world as Night School, the series will focus on Gray Langtry, the daughter of the British Prime Minister.

Books in series:

- Number 10 (2020)

== Personal life ==
CJ Daugherty lives in the south of England with her husband, the filmmaker Jack Jewers.
