= Bologna Motor Show =

Annual Italian auto show (1976–2019)

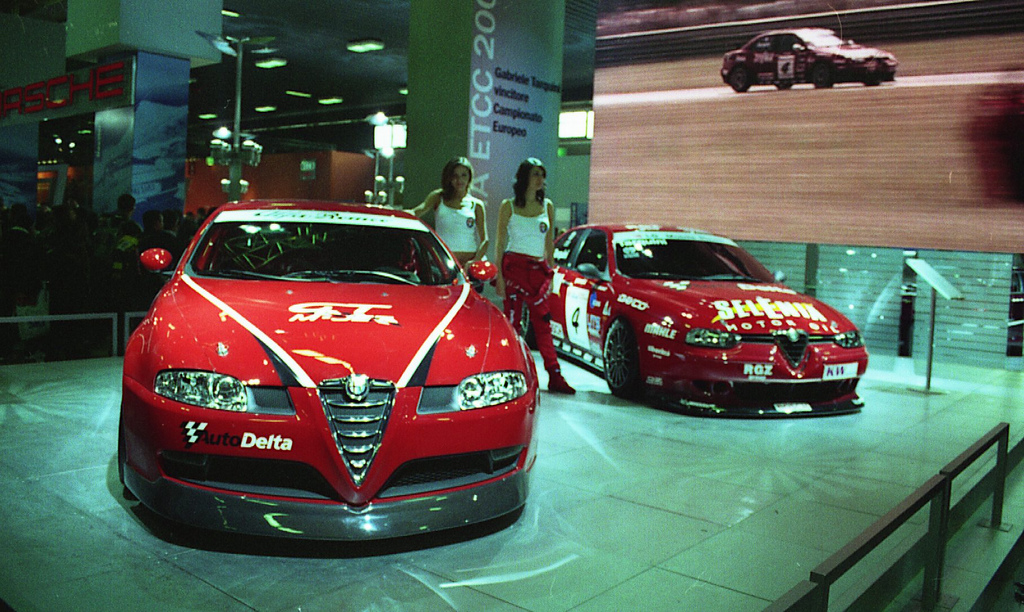
- Alfa Romeo GT at the 2003 Bologna Motor Show.
- Status: Inactive
- Genre: Auto show
- Frequency: Annual
- Country: Italy
- Years active: 1976–2019
- Previous event: 2 December 2017 – 10 December 2017
- Participants: 214
- Attendance: 819.313
- Area: 45.660 mq.
- Organiser: GL events Italia S.p.A.
- Website: www.motorshow.it/en/

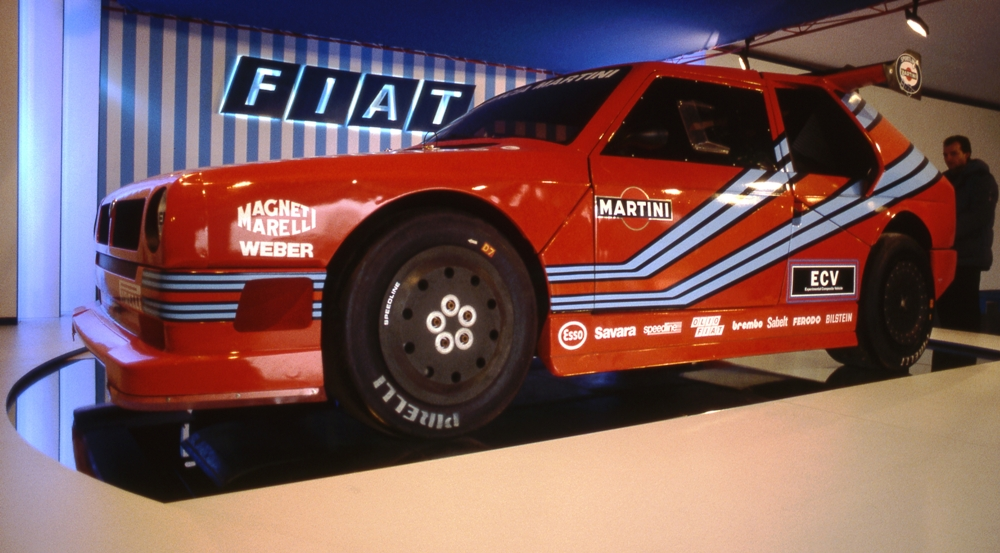
Lancia ECV at the 1986 edition

The Bologna Motor Show (known as the "Salone internazionale dell'auto e della moto di Bologna" in Italian) was an auto show which was scheduled to be held annually in December, in Bologna, Italy.

It was created and held for the first time in 1976 by Mario Zodiaco in Bologna. After the 1980 edition, he sold all the rights to Alfredo Cazzola.

The editions of 2009 and 2012 were the shortest events in its history, whereas the editions of 2013 and 2015 were not held, due to unfavourable economic conditions initially, and a lack of planning by new organizers and diminished interest by exhibitors, respectively. The edition of 2018 was also cancelled as well, with the format of the show completely changed by 2019.

As its name in Italian suggests, the Bologna Motor Show also plays the role of an annual Motorbike Exhibition, incorporating bicycle exhibitors for the first time in 1994.

Another highlight is its various motorsport competitions, which see the participation of leading drivers and motorbike riders. From 1988 to 1996, the main event was the Formula One Indoor Trophy, a Formula One single elimination competition, with competitors like Rubens Barrichello, Johnny Herbert, Gabriele Tarquini and Giancarlo Fisichella. From 1997 to 2007, it featured a Euro Formula 3000 race, with drivers like Thomas Biagi, André Lotterer and Marco Bonanomi.

== 2019 ==
The 44th Bologna International Motor Show of 2019 is now defunct, and converted to a show about virtual reality, driving simulators and video games.

== 2018 ==
The 43rd Bologna International Motor Show of 2018 did not take place, due to financial and logistical reasons.

== 2017 ==
The 42nd Bologna International Motor Show took place from December 2 to December 10, 2017.

== 2016 ==
The 41st Bologna International Motor Show took place from December 3 to December 11, 2016.

== 2015 ==
On 6 November 2015, it was announced that the 40th Bologna International Motor Show would not be held. Previously run by GL Events, the new organizer Bologna Fiere has arranged for the event to be part of the 2016 international calendar of the Organisation Internationale des Constructeurs d'Automobiles (OICA).

== 2014 ==
The 39th Bologna International Motor Show took place from December 6 to December 14, 2014.

== 2013 ==
On October 8, 2013, it was announced that the 38th Bologna International Motor Show had been cancelled, due to a lack of exhibitors caused by the general economic crisis in Europe.

== 2012 ==
The 37th Bologna International Motor Show took place from December 5 to December 9, 2012. This edition was akin to that held in 2009, affected by prevailing poor economic conditions.

== 2011 ==
The 36th Bologna International Motor Show took place in BolognaFiere, Bologna, Italy from December 3 to December 11, 2011.

Presentations:

- Alfa Romeo Giulietta (LPG)
- Ferrari 599XX Evolution Package

== 2010 ==
The 35th Bologna International Motor Show took place from December 2 to December 4, 2010.

Presentations:

- DR1 Electric
- Ferrari 458 Challenge
- Opel Antara (facelift)
- Opel Corsa (facelift)
- Peugeot EX1 concept

== 2009 ==
The 34th Bologna International Motor Show was shortened to five days due to the overall crisis affecting the automotive industry at the time, and took place from December 4 to December 8, 2009.

Presentations:

- Mazda3
- Tazzari Zero

== 2008 ==
The 33rd Bologna International Motor Show took place from December 5 to December 14, 2008.

Presentations:

- Citroën C1
- Mazda3
- Opel Insignia
- Tata Indica Electric
- Volkswagen Golf Plus

== 2007 ==
The 32nd Bologna International Motor Show took place from December 7 to December 16, 2007. This edition of the show was the largest ever, featuring the highest number of exhibitors.

Presentations:

- Alfa Romeo 147 Ducati Edition
- Audi A3 Cabriolet
- Citroën C5
- Citroën C5 Airscape Concept
- Citroën Nemo Concept
- Ford Focus Style Wagon (facelift)
- Hummer H3 Black Edition
- Hyundai i10
- Mahindra Goa GLX 2.5 CRDe six seater (European launch)
- Mahindra Bolero 2.5 CRDe EURO4 single cab pickup (European launch)
- Mahindra Goa DX EURO4 (European launch)
- Mazda5 (facelift)
- Mitsubishi Lancer Evolution X (European launch)
- Opel Zafira (facelift)
- Peugeot Bipper Tepee Concept
- Porsche Boxster RS60 Spyder
- Renault Modus (facelift)
- Renault Grand Modus
- Martin Motors Bubble (European launch, licensed from Shuanghuan)
- Subaru Impreza STI N14 by Prodrive
- Subaru Impreza 2.5 STI AWD (European launch)
- Tata Ace Electric
- Tata Elegante concept (European launch)

== 2006 ==
The 31st Bologna International Motor Show took place from December 5 to December 17, 2006.

Presentations:

- Diesel Chevrolet Lacetti
- DR 3
- DR 5
- Fiat Panda
- Ford C-Max (facelift)
- Great Wall Hover Limousine (European launch)
- Katay Gonow Troy (European launch)
- Katay Gonow Victory (European launch)
- Lamborghini Murciélago LP640 Roadster (European launch)
- Maserati MC12 Corsa
- MY2007 Opel Astra
- Martin Motors CEO (European launch, under licence by Shuanghuan)
- Škoda Roomster Scout
- Smart Fortwo
- SsangYong Actyon Sport SUT (European launch)
- Tata Indica 1.4 DICOR 16v
- Tata Indigo SW 1.4 DICOR 16v
- Tata Safari 2.2 DICOR
- Tata TL Sprint
- Toyota Auris (European launch)
- Volkswagen CrossTouran

== 2005 ==
The 30th Bologna International Motor Show took place from November to December 10, 2005.

Presentations:

- Ferrari F2005
- Ferrari FXX
- Fiat Panda Monster
- Fiat Sedici

== 2004 ==
The 29th Bologna International Motor Show took place from December 6 to December 14, 2004.

Presentations:

- Alfa Romeo 166 (facelift)
- Mercedes-Benz B-Class
- Mercedes-Benz CLS-Class (W219)
- Mitsubishi Grandis
- Škoda Octavia Wagon 4x4
- Volvo XC90 V8

== 2003 ==
The 28th Bologna International Motor Show took place from December 4 to December 14, 2003.

Presentations:

- Alfa Romeo 147 GTA Selespeed
- Citroën C3 X-Treme Concept
- Ferrari 360 GTC
- Kia KCD-I Slice Concept
- SEAT Altea Prototipo Concept
- Volvo V50

== 2002 ==
The 27th Bologna International Motor Show took place from December 8 to December 9, 2002.

Presentations:

- Alfa Romeo 156 GTAm
- Dodge Razor Concept
- Fiat Barchetta
- Fiat Doblò Sandstorm Concept
- Fiat Panda Simba
- Lancia Y Vanity
- Maserati Trofeo

== 2001 ==
The 26th Bologna International Motor Show took place from November to December 10, 2001.

Presentations:

- Alfa Romeo 156 GTA/Sportwagon GTA
- Audi A4 Convertible
- Audi S6
- Citroën C3
- Fiat Stilo
- Honda S2000
- Mercedes-Benz SL-Class (R230)
- Mini Cooper S
- Mitsubishi Pajero
- Mitsubishi Pajero Evolution concept
- Opel Signum2 Concept
- Peugeot 607
- SEAT Ibiza
- Subaru Impreza
- Volkswagen Polo
- Volkswagen W12 Concept

== 1999 ==
- Alfa Romeo Centauri Concept
- Lamborghini Diablo GTR (race car)
- Town Life

== 1995 ==
- Lamborghini Diablo Roadster VT
- Maserati Ghibli Open Cup
- Volvo V40

== 1994 ==
- Alfa Romeo 146
- Audi A4
- Daewoo No.1 Concept
- Maserati Ghibli
- ODA Spider
- Škoda Felicia
- Zlatko Cosmopolit

This edition of the Motor Show saw the motorbike manufacturers exhibiting their products for the first time. Ducati thus took the opportunity to present their 916 Senna superbike, which Ayrton Senna himself had endorsed months prior to his fatal crash in May 1994. In addition, this edition also saw the inclusion of bicycle manufacturers and a kermesse competition with the participation of leading Italian professionals Gianni Bugno and Claudio Chiappucci.
