= Rover CityRover =

Hatchback supermini

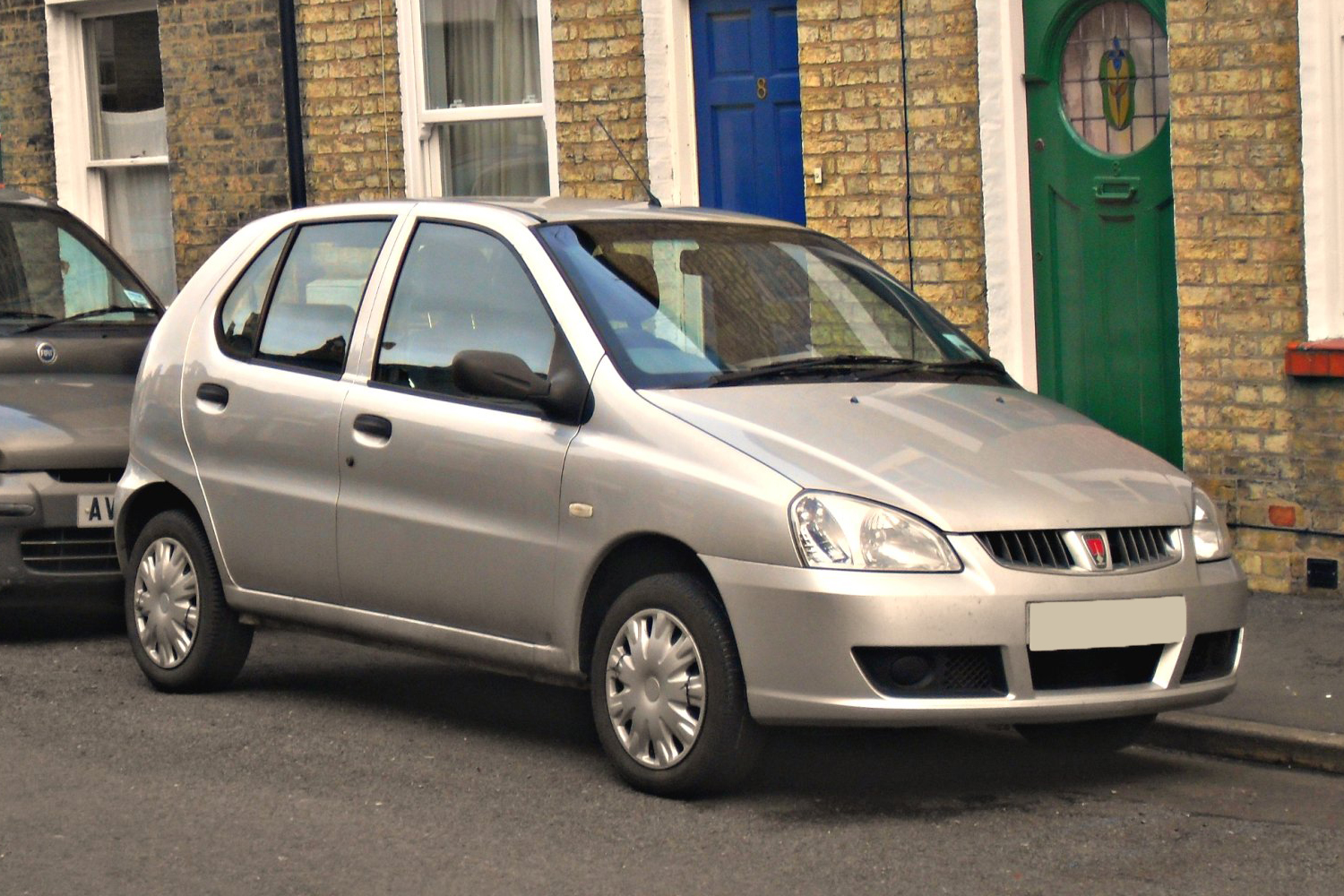

Overview
- Manufacturer: Tata Motors
- Also called: Tata Indica
- Production: 2003–2005
- Assembly: India: Pune, Maharashtra
- Designer: I.DE.A Institute

Body and chassis
- Class: Supermini
- Body style: 5-door hatchback
- Layout: Front-engine, front-wheel-drive
- Related: Tata Indigo

Powertrain
- Engine: 1.4 L I4 (petrol)
- Transmission: 5-speed manual

Dimensions
- Wheelbase: 2,400 mm (94.5 in)
- Length: 3,703 mm (145.8 in)
- Width: 1,620 mm (63.8 in)
- Height: 1,500 mm (59.1 in)
- Kerb weight: 1,040 kg (2,293 lb)

Chronology
- Predecessor: Rover Metro

The Rover CityRover is a supermini car that was marketed by the former British manufacturer MG Rover under the Rover marque, between 2003 and 2005. Launched in the autumn of 2003, the car was a rebadged version of the Indian developed Tata Indica. Its performance was considered poor for a small car in contemporary road tests, and its lack of quality, poor road handling and high price were not well received.

Production of the CityRover ceased in April 2005, along with the rest of the MG Rover range, when the company fell into administration.

== Technical details ==
The CityRover was offered with only one engine: a Peugeot derived 1,405 cc (1.4 L) four cylinder, eight valve engine producing 85 bhp (63 kW; 86 PS) and 88 lb⋅ft (119 N⋅m). It could accelerate to 60 mph in 11.9 seconds and had a top speed of 100 mph (160.9 km/h).

The CityRover was manufactured by Tata Motors, at their factory in Pune, India. Alterations for the British market included new bumpers, Rover badge grille, 14" wheels, and new suspension settings.

== Safety ==
The high driving position and large glass area afforded drivers with good all-round visibility, while the rear lamps were mounted high up on the structure so other road users could see them more prominently. All doors were fitted with anti-intrusion bars, with child locks on the rear doors.

The steering column was collapsible, and a driver-side airbag was fitted as standard to all models, with a passenger airbag standard on the top trim level and available as an option on the entry-level and midrange trims. All seats had anti-submarine ramps and three-point seatbelts, with the front getting belt pretensioners and height-adjustable head restraints. ABS was included on "style" models.

== Criticism ==
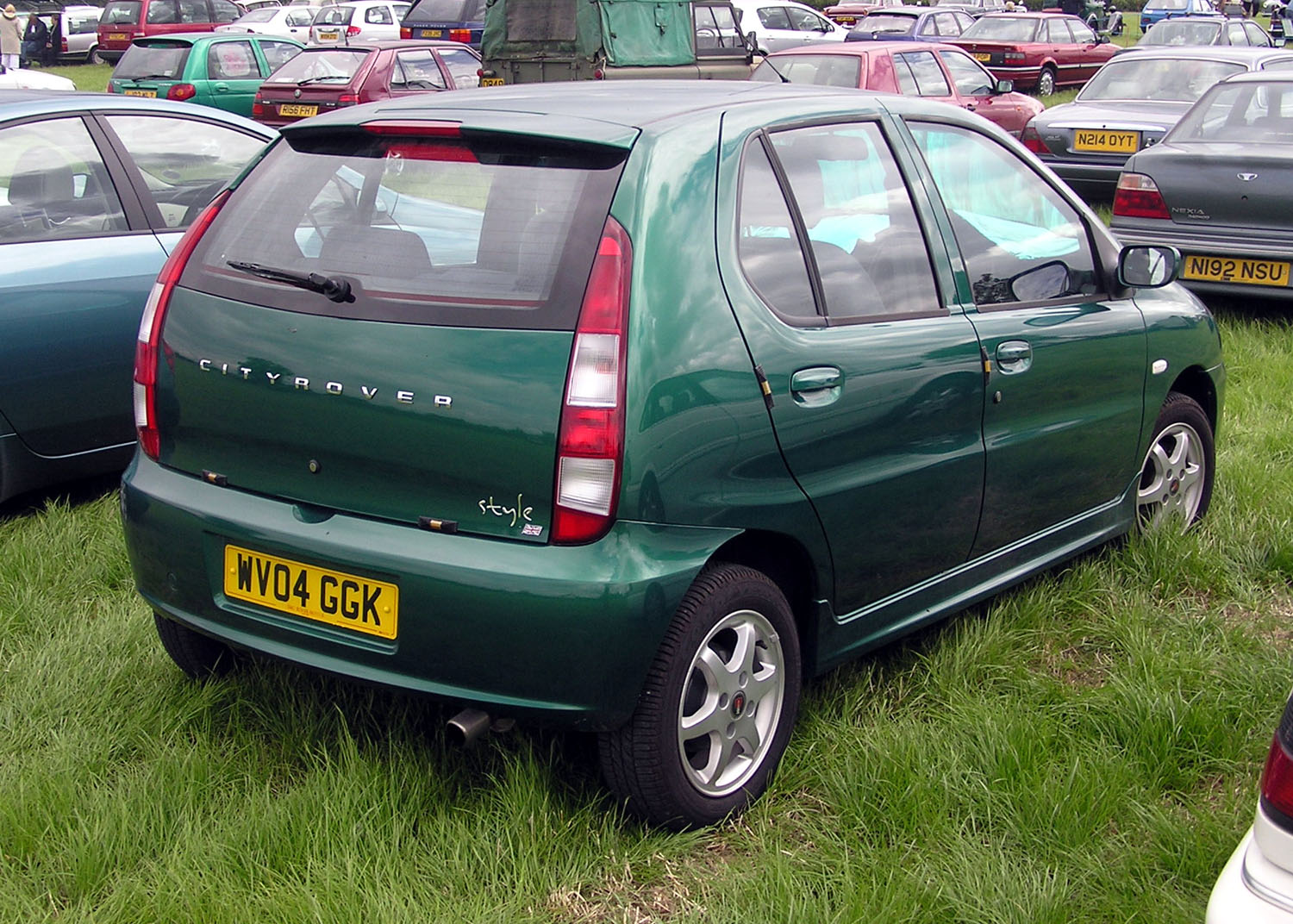
2004 Rover CityRover (United Kingdom)

MG Rover was reported to be paying Tata £3,000 for each car and, with each model featuring a Rover corporate nose and revised suspension settings, the buying public was not impressed by the £6,495 starting price.

In May 2004, Rover refused to lend a CityRover to motoring show Top Gear to test it. In order to answer the question of "just how bad could it be?" James May went undercover and test drove one at a dealer while carrying a hidden camera. May went on to say, "that is the worst car I have driven on this programme".

Sales were well short of MG Rover's targets, so the CityRover was given an upgrade for the 2005 model year, with more standard equipment. In December 2004, prices were reduced by £900, confirming that the car's previous prices had not been competitive.

According to car reviewer Parker's, the CityRover was the worst rated Rover car from MG Rover, with a rating of two out of five. In October 2013, Top Gear Magazine placed the CityRover on its list of "The thirteen worst cars of the last twenty years."
