= Electrovaya =

Canadian battery manufacturer

- Type: Public
- Traded as: TSX: ELVA; Nasdaq: ELVA
- Industry: Litihum-ion battery
- Founded: 1996
- Founders: Dr. Sankar Das Gupta; Dr. Jim Jacobs
- Headquarters: Mississauga, Ontario, Canada
- Key people: Dr. Sankar Das Gupta (Executive Chairman)
- Number of employees: 53 (December 2019)
- Subsidiaries: Evonik Litarion GmbH; Miljobil Grenland AS
- Website: electrovaya.com

Electrovaya Inc. is a developer and manufacturer of lithium-ion batterys and battery systems for automotive, warehousing, autonomous guided vehicle, and energy storage applications. The company has operations in NY State and based in Ontario, Canada.

== History ==
The company was founded by Dr. Sankar Das Gupta and Dr. Jim Jacobs in 1996, following their research into battery technologies beginning in 1983. The company went public in 2000, and is listed on the Toronto Stock Exchange and the Nasdaq Stock Market under the symbol ELVA.

Electrovaya owns over 100 patents (issued and pending) pertaining to electrode and electrolyte materials, battery architectures, battery system designs, battery management systems, and battery manufacturing methods.

In addition to developing batteries for electric vehicle and grid storage applications, Electrovaya were among the first developers of mobile battery chargers for electronic devices, releasing the Powerpad in 2001. This technology was the predecessor to the battery used in the Scribbler tablet computer series. Electrovaya technology has also been used by NASA in their EMU system.

Since 2018, the company has focused primarily on heavy duty vehicle applications, including material handling and other uses.

== Electric vehicles ==
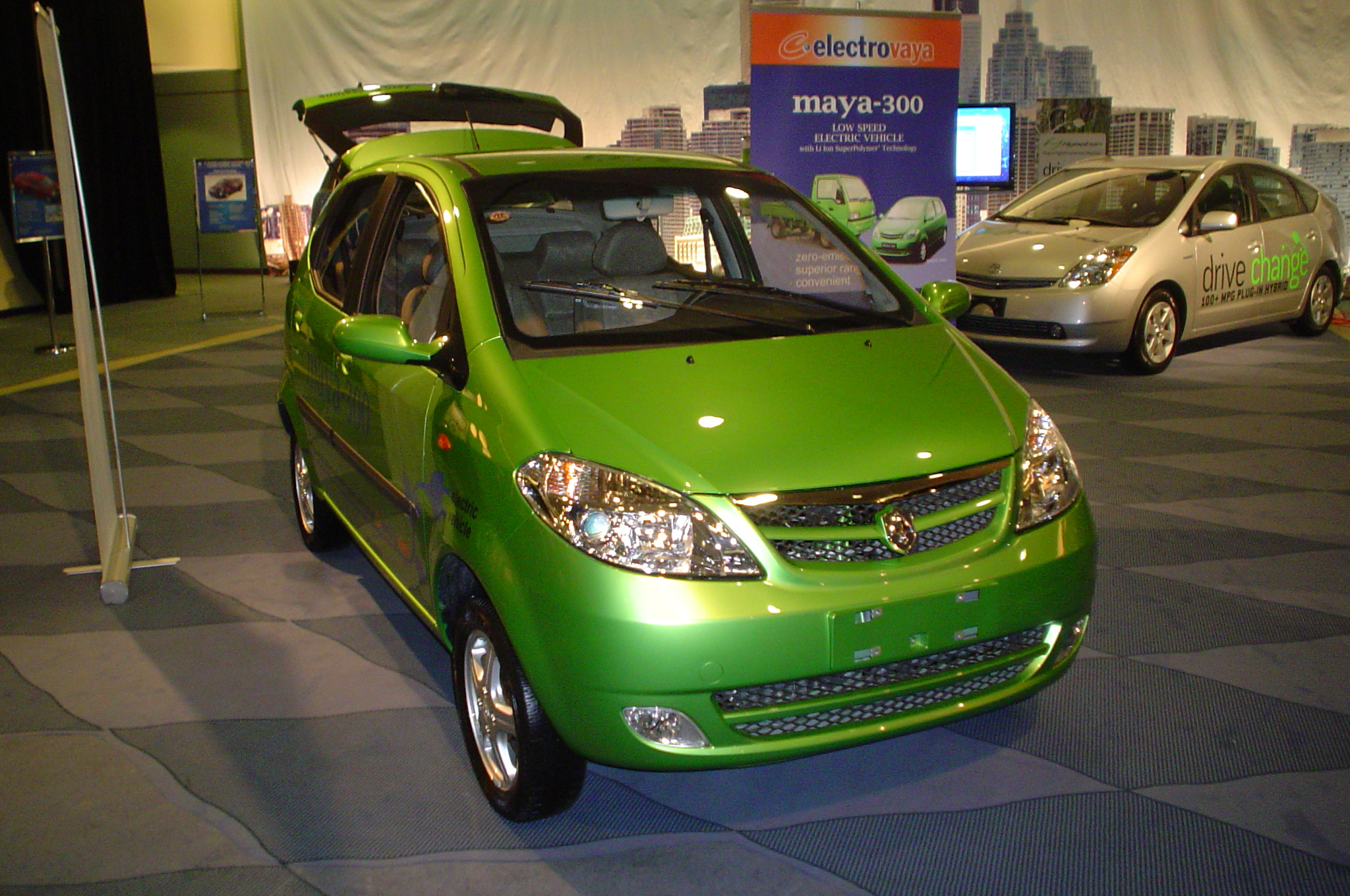
The Maya-300 concept car at the 2009 Canadian International Auto Show in Toronto

Electrovaya lift-truck battery

In 2003, Electrovaya released the Maya-100, a prototype Zero-emissions vehicle powered by lithium-ion batteries. The Maya-100 debuted at the 20th International Electric Vehicle Symposium at Long Beach, CA, and won the Technology Innovation Award at the Tour de Sol in 2004. In January 2008, Electrovaya launched the prototype Maya-300, a low-speed electric car for city driving.

=== Tata Indica EV ===
Electrovaya has partnered with Tata Motors and Miljø Grenland/Innovasjon to manufacture batteries and electric cars using Electrovaya's Lithium Ion SuperPolymer battery technology. The Tata Indica EV was scheduled to be launched in Norway in 2009 and India in 2010, projected to have a 200 km (120 mi) range on a full charge and a top speed of 105 kilometres per hour (65 mph).

=== Car-sharing ===
The first all-electric car-sharing program in the U.S. debuted at Baltimore's Inner Harbor with Electrovaya offering its Maya-300 for rent at the Maryland Science Center in 2009. The car could go up to 200 kilometres (120 mi) on one charge of its lithium-ion battery system, and had a top speed of 56 kilometres per hour (35 mph).

=== Daimler ===
Electrovaya purchased Daimler's 700 MWh/year battery factory in Europe in 2015 to produce batteries for Daimler's Smart electric drive car from 2015 to 2018.

=== Electric Lift-Trucks ===
In 2017, Electrovaya released heavy-duty Li-ion batteries designed for near continuous use in electric lift-trucks. In 2019 and 2020, the Raymond Corporation (a 100% subsidiary of Toyota) announced strategic agreements to use Electrovaya batteries as part of their electric forklift and battery product line.

=== Autonomous Guided Vehicles ===
Electrovaya developed and produced batteries suitable for smart-charging Autonomous guided vehicles, and partnered with Jabil to release an autonomous robot at ProMat 2019.

== Energy Storage Systems ==
Electrovaya stationary energy storage system in downtown Toronto

In 2013, Electrovaya delivered 25 stationary battery energy storage systems to Scottish and Southern Electricity Networks , ranging from 12 to 80 kWh, for the integration of renewable energy into power grids.

In 2015, Electrovaya installed a 450 kWh energy storage system for Glencore's microgrid at a remote mine in northern Canada, allowing alternative energy sources to be used and reducing reliance on diesel generators.

In 2016, Electrovaya completed a pilot project with Toronto Hydro to develop a containerized 600 kWh battery to balance grid loads.

Electrovaya also developed a transportable energy storage system for ConEdison capable of storing 800 kWh of energy to use during grid blackouts.

== See also ==
- Miljø Grenland
- Tata Indica
- Smart electric drive
