= I.DE.A Institute =

Italian automobile company

I.DE.A Institute S.p.A.
- Type: S.p.A.
- Industry: Automotive
- Founded: December 14, 1978; 47 years ago
- Founder: Franco Mantegazza
- Defunct: 2019
- Fate: Liquidated
- Headquarters: Turin, Italy
- Key people: Franco Mantegazza (Founder); Renzo Piano
- Services: industrial engineering and design, automobile design and prototyping
- Number of employees: > 350
- Parent: Quantum Kapital AG group
- Website: www.ideainstitute.it

I.DE.A Institute (acronym, Institute of Development in Automotive Engineering) was an automobile design and engineering company in Turin, Italy, founded in 1978 by Franco Mantegazza and architect Renzo Piano, with engineer Peter Rice as Vice President, and help from others like automotive designer Rudolf Hruska and former Fiat head of engineering Ettore Cordiano.

The Rieter Holding Ltd took full control of the company in 2002. The company grew with offices in China and Brazil by the time Rieter sold the company in 2010 to the Swiss investment group Quantum Kapital AG. The company was liquidated in 2019.

== Notable work ==
- 1981 Fiat VSS, the first commission from Fiat
- 1988 Fiat Tipo
- 1988 Ferrari PPG Indy Pace Car
- 1989 Lancia Dedra
- 1990 Fiat Tempra
- 1992 Alfa Romeo 155
- 1992 IDEA Grigua and Grigua Off-Road concepts
- 1993 Lancia Delta
- 1993 Nissan Terrano II/Ford Maverick
- 1994 Lancia Kappa
- 1994 Fiat Lampo concept
- 1994 IDEA Gritta concept
- 1995 Daihatsu Move
- 1996 Fiat Vuscià concept
- 1996 Fiat Siena
- 1996 Fiat Palio
- 1996 Mercedes-Benz Vito (W638)/Viano
- 1997 Dacia D33
- 1997 Daewoo Nubira
- 1998 Tata Indica
- 2000 Kia Rio
- 2002 Tata Indigo
- 2003 Changan Jiexun concept
- 2003 Fiat Panda Marrakech
- 2004 Fiat Trepiùno (construction only).
- 2006 Buick LaCrosse
- 2008 Tata Nano
- 2008 IDEA ERA concept
- 2010 IDEA Sofia concept
- 2012 Ssang Yong XIV-1 and XIV-2 in 2012. Concepts for SsangYong Tivoli.

== Notable designers ==
- Renzo Piano
- Walter de Silva 1977–1986
- Ercole Spada 1983–1992
- Carlo Gaino 1987
- Justyn Norek 1983–2006
- Francois Lampreia
- Umberto Palermo 2008–

== Gallery ==
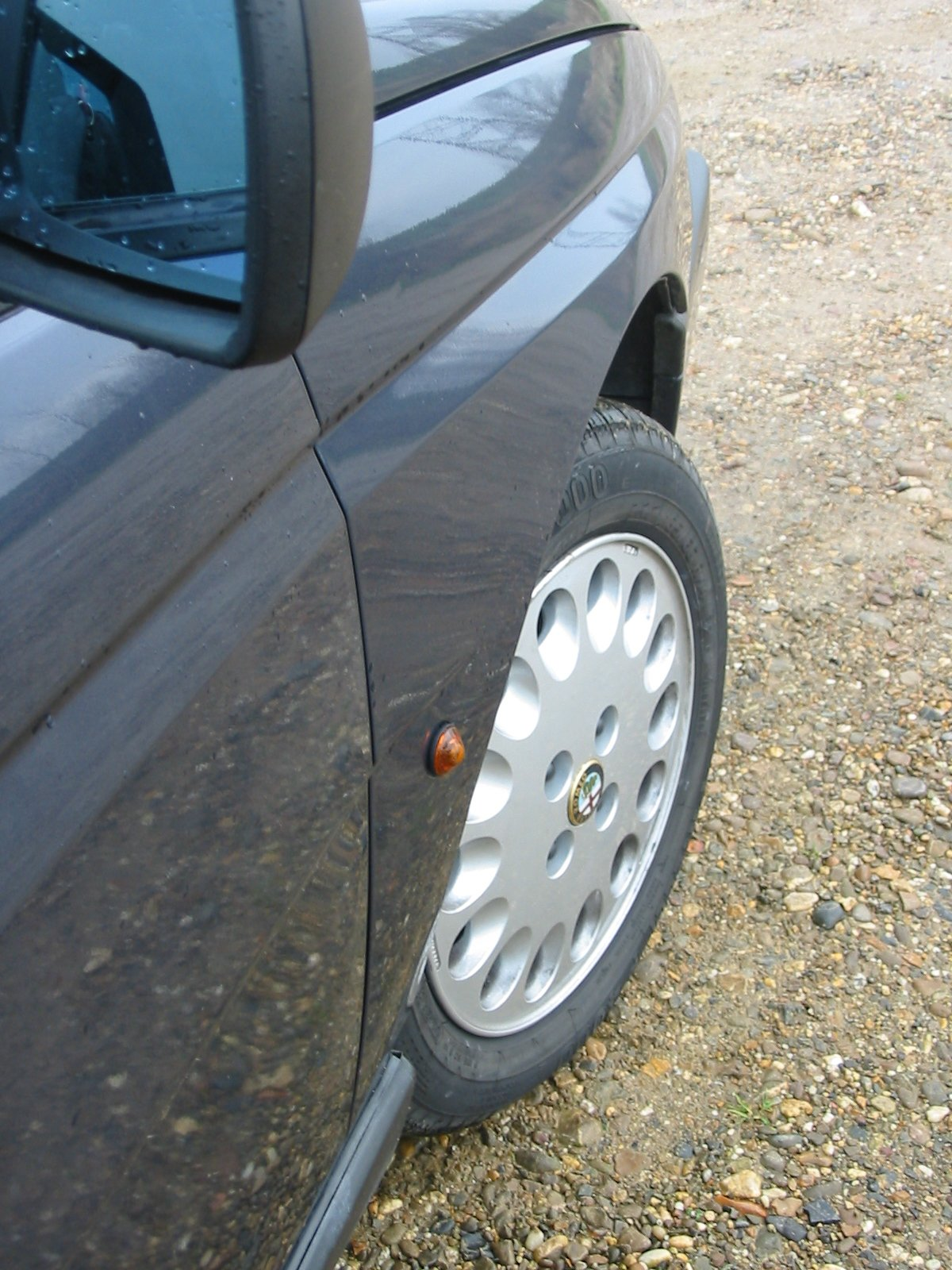
Details of the Alfa Romeo 155

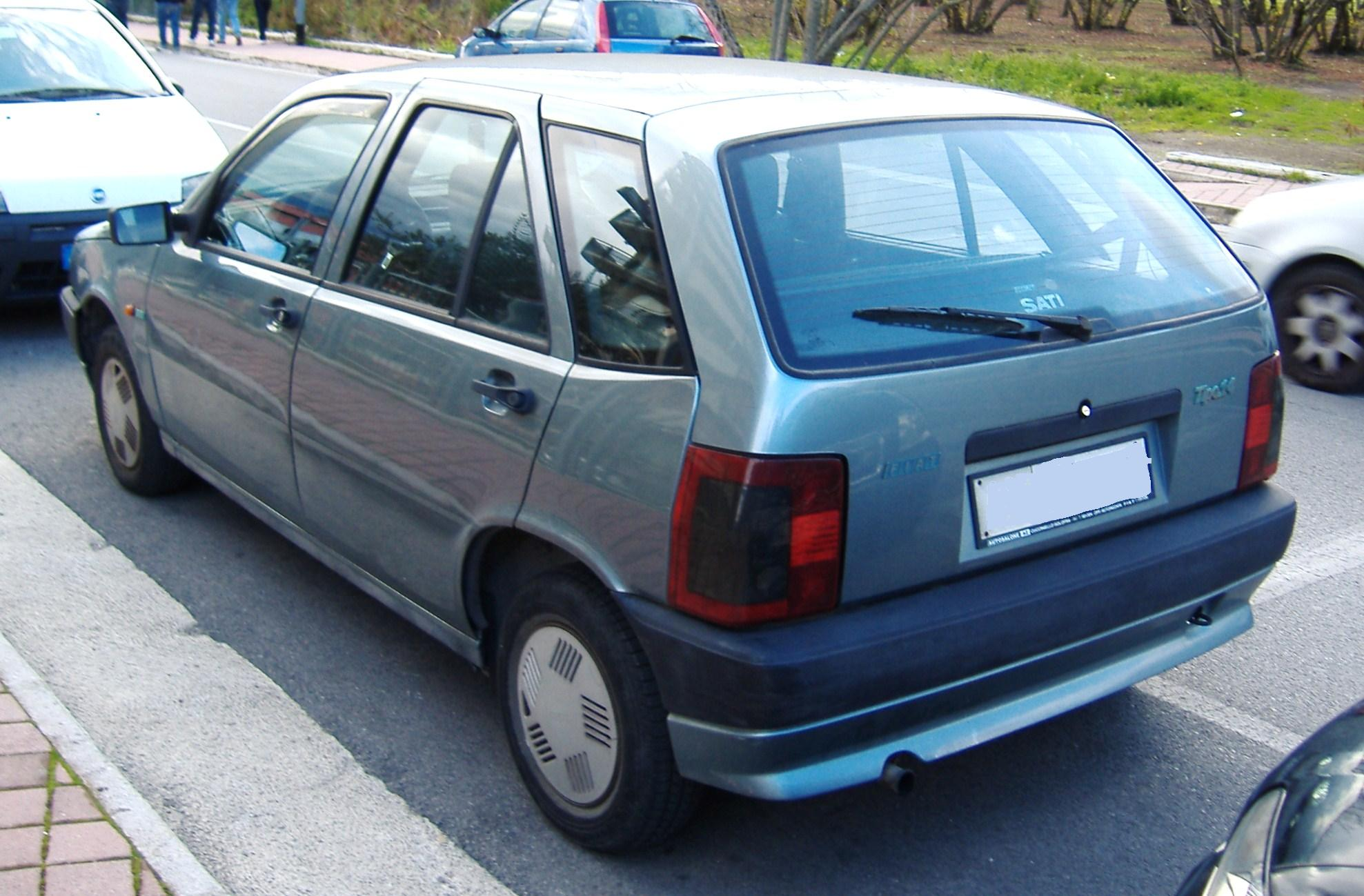
Rear view of the Fiat Tipo

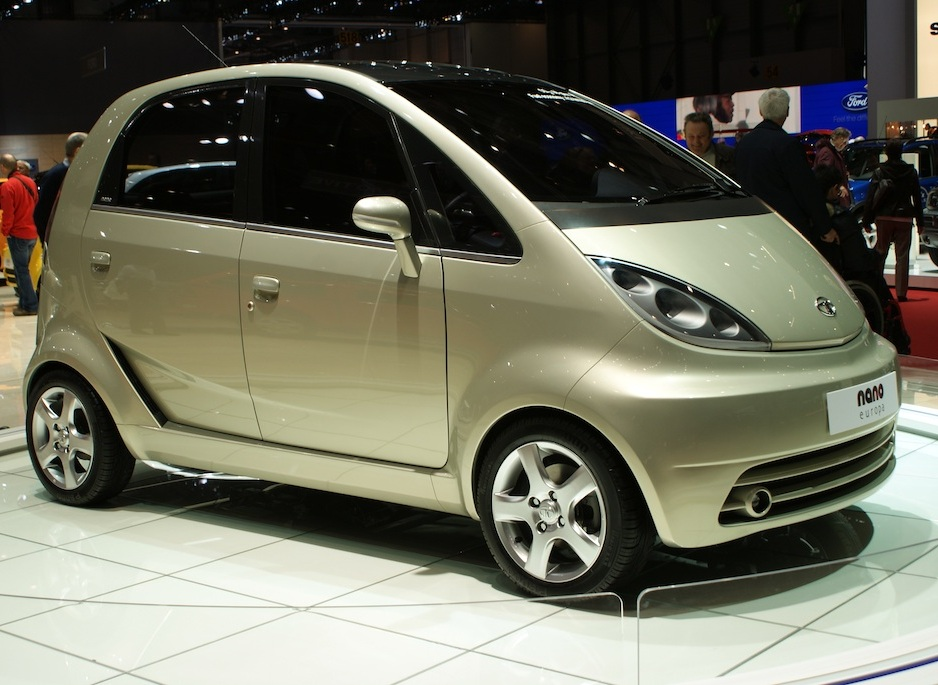
Tata Nano, here Europa at Geneva 2009

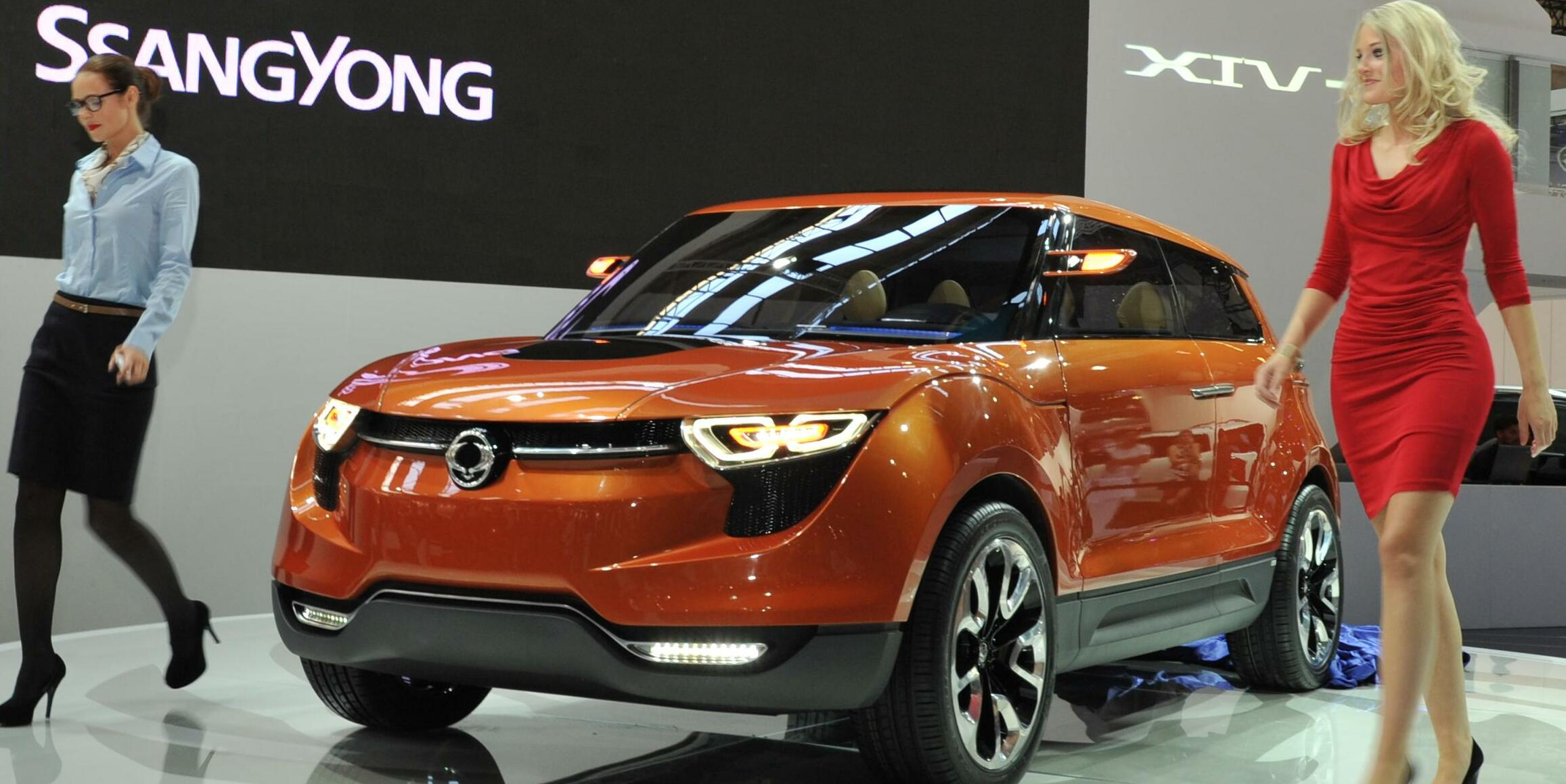
Ssang Yong XIV-1, Geneva 2012

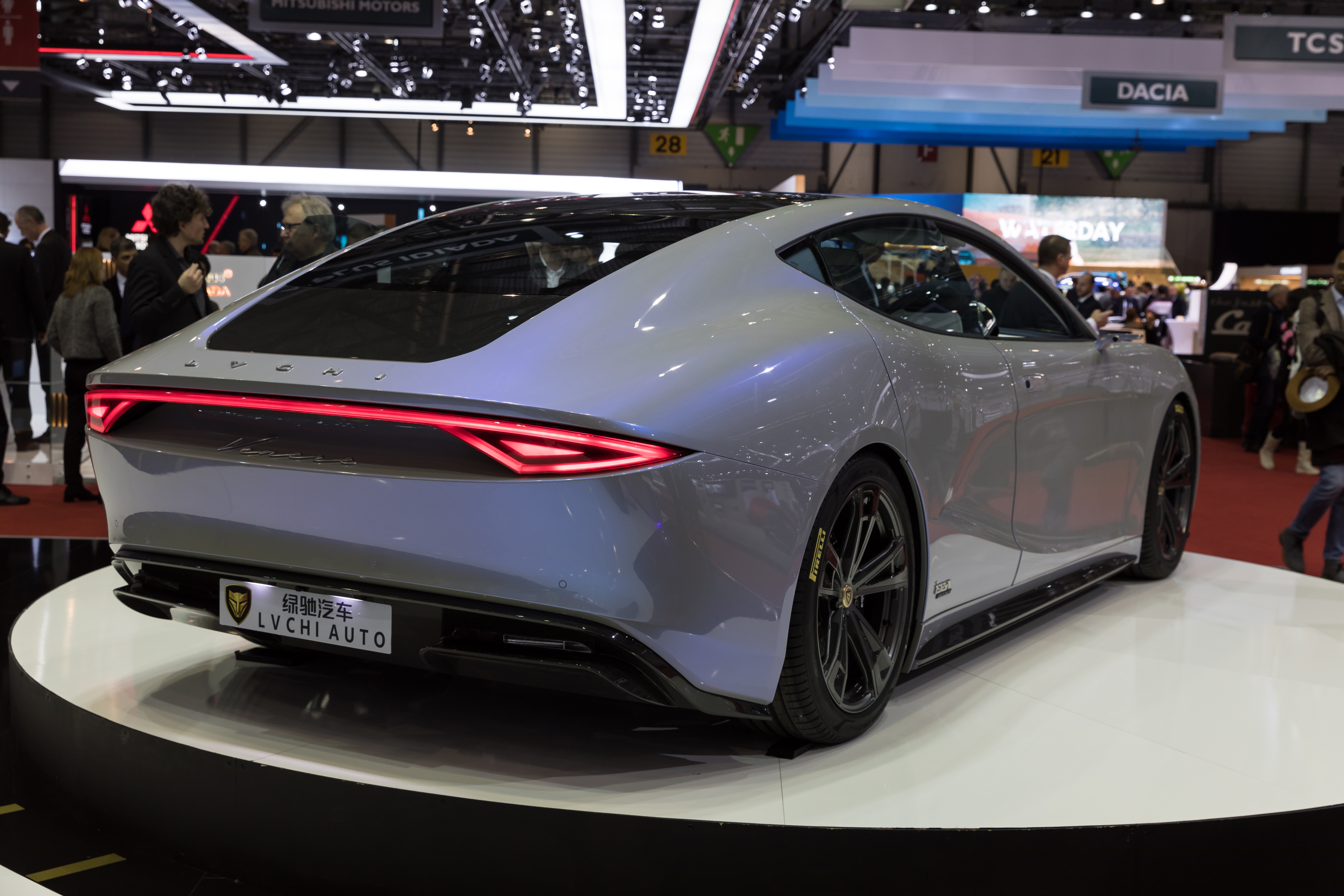
LvChi Venere, Geneva 2018
