= Tata Elegante =

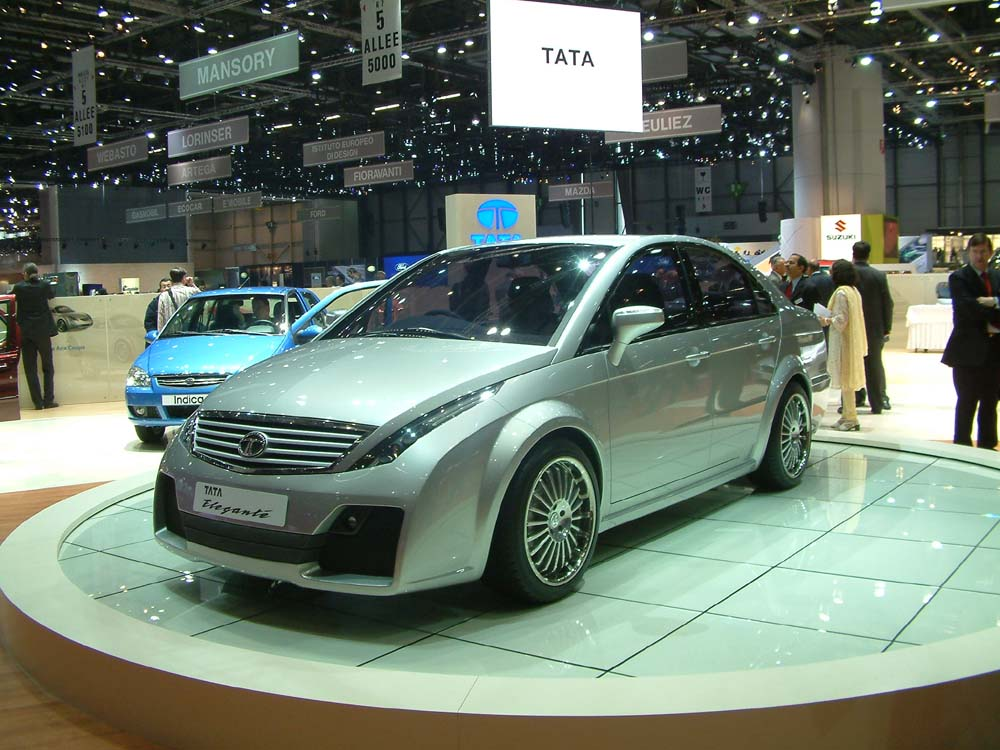
TATA Elegante

The Tata Elegante is a concept car that was displayed by Tata Motors during the 2007 Geneva Motor Show. It is rumoured to contain many design cues which will be found on the next generation Tata Indigo. The Elegante is designed to use a 4-cylinder engine between 1.4 and 2 litres and a compact v6 petrol engine.

Common rail direct injection turbo diesel engines with variable valve timing and capabilities to comply with Euro V emissions norms will also be available. Power varies from 90 PS (66 kW; 89 hp) to 200 PS (147 kW; 197 hp) with torque of up to 280 N⋅m (207 lb⋅ft). Transmission options include 6-speed manual and automatic gearboxes.

Besides meeting all European safety, crashworthiness and emission standards, the Tata Elegant features include satellite navigation system, cruise control, integrated blue tooth compatibility, heated mirrors, rain sensor, front and rear parking sensors, and many other contemporary features.
