= Jayem Automotives =

Indian automotive development company

- Company type: Private Sector
- Industry: Automotive
- Founded: 1969; 57 years ago
- Founder: B. Jayachandran
- Headquarters: Coimbatore, India
- Area served: Worldwide
- Website: Jayem Automotives

Jayem Automotives Private Limited is an Indian automotive R&D and manufacturing company based in Coimbatore. The company is involved in engine, gearbox, chassis, suspension development, and manufacturing of electric vehicles and powertrain systems.

== History ==
Jayem Automoties was founded by Indian automobile designer B. Jayachandran in 1969. In 1999, Jayem Automotives entered into a joint venture agreement with Mahindra & Mahindra to develop various new vehicles, engines and suspension systems. The company also worked with Hindustan Motors on various vehicle developments.

In 2005, the company severed ties with Mahindra & Mahindra and partnered with Tata Motors to test and develop various vehicle development programmes. In 2017, Ratan Tata invested in Jayem Automotives to develop electric drive systems for the automotive industry. Later in the year, Tata Motors and Jayem launched JTP, a joint venture company to manufacture performance brand cars.
