= Changan Joice =

Chinese Minivan

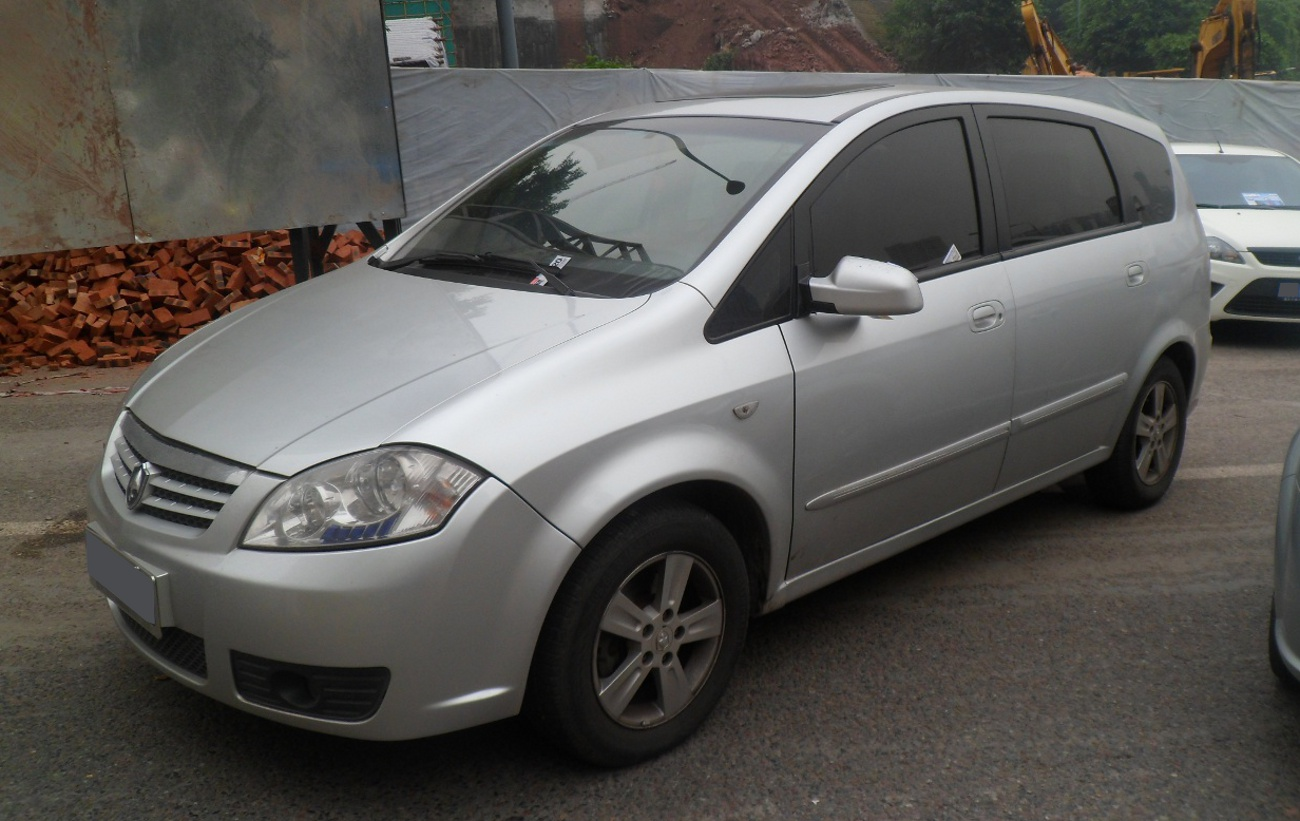
- Chana Joice

Overview
- Manufacturer: Changan Automobile
- Also called: Chana Joice; Changan Jiexun
- Production: 2007–2009
- Model years: 2007–2009

Body and chassis
- Class: Minivan (M)
- Body style: 5-door minivan
- Layout: Front-engine, Front-wheel-drive

Powertrain
- Engine: 2.0 L CA20 I4 (petrol)
- Transmission: 5-speed manual 5-speed automatic

Dimensions
- Wheelbase: 2,710 mm (106.7 in)
- Length: 4,445 mm (175.0 in)
- Width: 1,768 mm (69.6 in)
- Height: 1,640 mm (64.6 in)
- Curb weight: 1485-1515kg

The Changan Joice (Chinese: 长安杰勋, pinyin: Cháng'ān Jiéxūn) is a minivan produced by Changan Automobile.

== Overview ==
Launched in 2007, the Changan Joice is a 7-seater MPV. The powertrain of the Changan Joice features a 2.0 liter 4-Cylinder petrol engine producing 112 kW and 192 Nm of torque mated to a 5-speed manual or automatic transmission.

== Changan Jiexun HEV ==
Launched in 2008, the Changan Jiexun HEV is China's first domestic-brand hybrid vehicle. The fuel economy of the Jiexun HEV is improved 20 percent when compared to the non-hybrid version launched in 2007, and the emissions of the Changan Jiexun HEV meets EU-IV emission standards. Changan Automobiles invested 300 million yuan ($40.7 million) in researching and developing the Changan Jiexun HEV for production.
