= MG ZR =

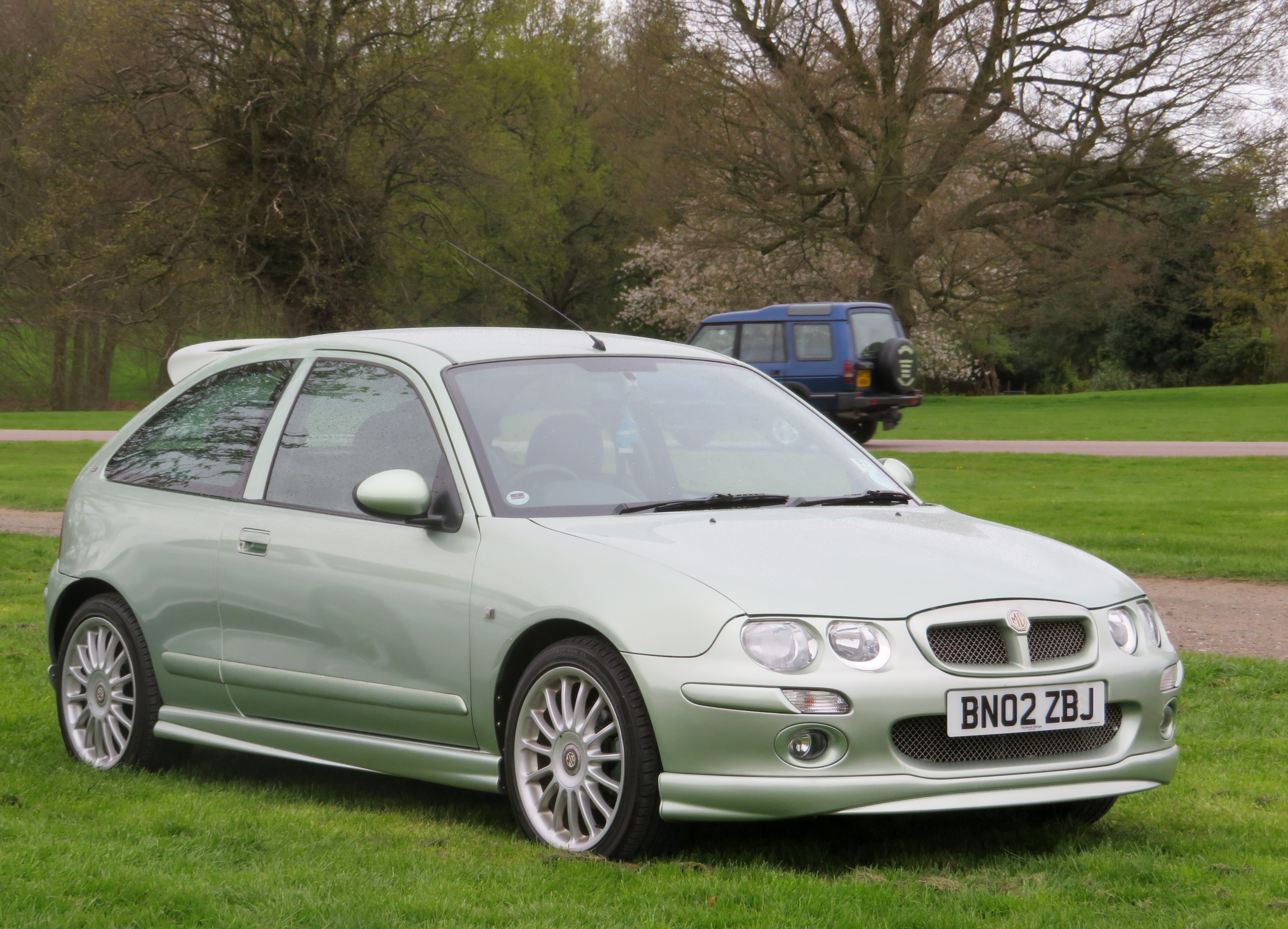

Overview
- Manufacturer: MG (MG Rover)
- Production: 2001–2005
- Assembly: United Kingdom: Longbridge, Birmingham (Longbridge Plant)

Body and chassis
- Class: Hot hatch (C)
- Body style: 3/5-door hatchback; 3-door panel van (MG Express)
- Layout: FF layout
- Related: Rover 25; Rover Streetwise; MG3 SW

Powertrain
- Engine: Petrol: 1.4 L K-series I4; 1.8 L K-series I4; 1.8 L K-series VVC I4; Diesel: 2.0 L L-series turbo I4

Chronology
- Predecessor: MG Metro
- Successor: MG3

The MG ZR is an MG branded "hot hatch" version of the Rover 25 supermini class car, produced by MG Rover at their Longbridge plant in Birmingham from 2001 to 2005. Compared to the Rover 25, the ZR featured a number of styling modifications and performance enhancements, such as updated sports suspension and a less baffled exhaust.

== Reception ==
The MG ZR was one of Britain's most popular sporting hatchbacks throughout its production life, and in 2004, it was MG Rover's best selling car—the first time that any MG product had been the most popular product of any of the many combines that had owned the MG marque.

Tens of thousands of MG ZRs were sold in Britain and proved particularly popular with young buyers who were attracted by deals such as free insurance and discounts that were the equivalent of VAT. The car was made until April 2005. While its handling was praised by reviewers, other aspects of the ZR were found to be inadequate.

== Performance ==
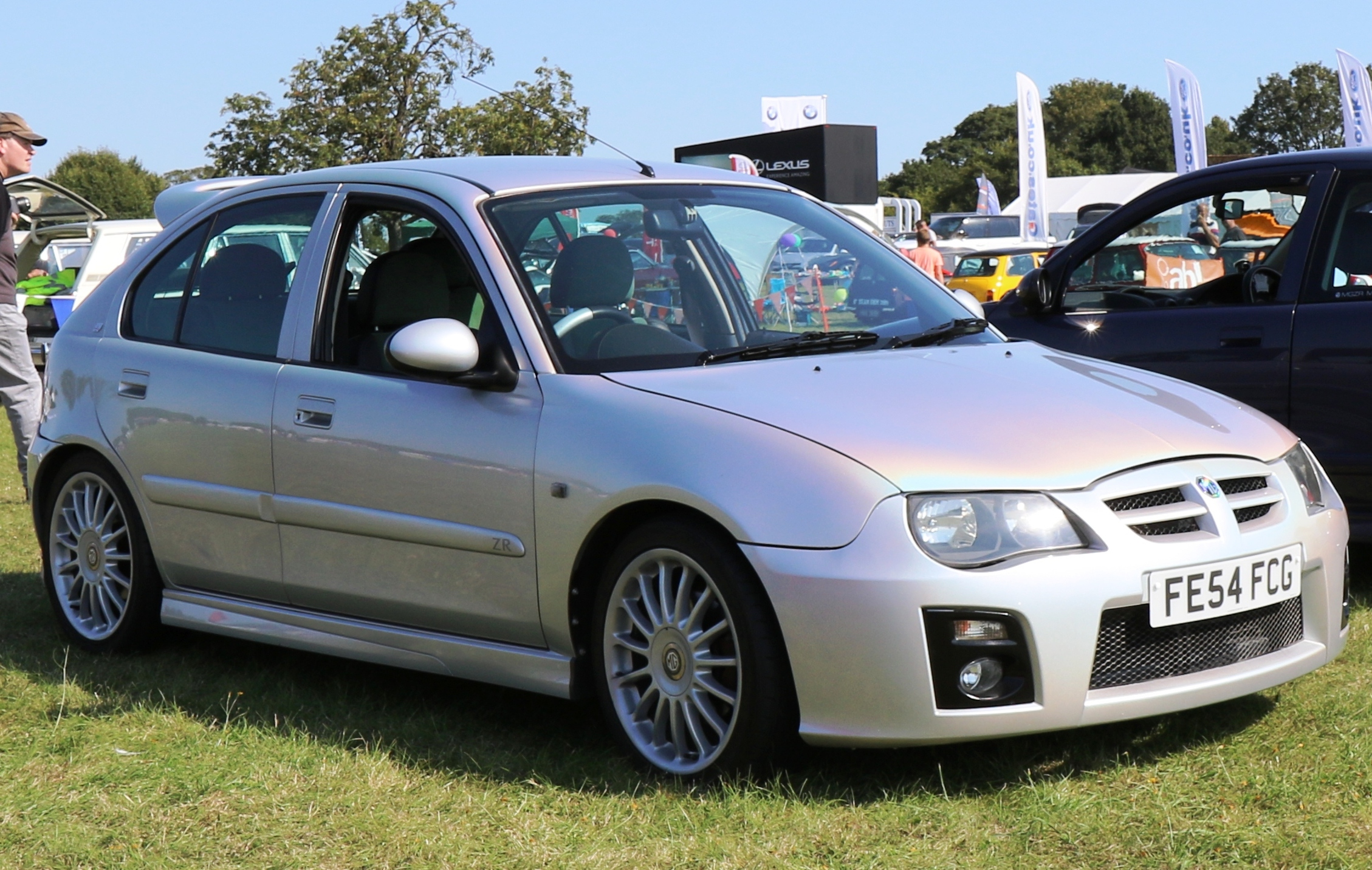
A five-door MG ZR (facelift)

The entry level ZR 105 came with the 16 valve 1.4 K series engine which produced 102 bhp (76 kW; 103 PS) and 123 N⋅m (91 lb⋅ft) torque giving a 0–60 mph time of 9.7 seconds and a top speed of 111 mph (179 km/h). It featured 262mm solid discs up front and drum brakes at the rear.

The ZR 120 came with a larger 1.8 K series engine which produced 115 bhp (86 kW; 117 PS) and 160 N⋅m (120 lb⋅ft) torque giving a 0–60 mph time of 8.6 seconds and a top speed of 119 mph (192 km/h). This had a more advanced brake set up despite the small power increase, featuring the same diameter 262mm discs up front, but this time vented for better cooling. The drums at the back were also replaced with 239mm solid discs to maintain braking balance.

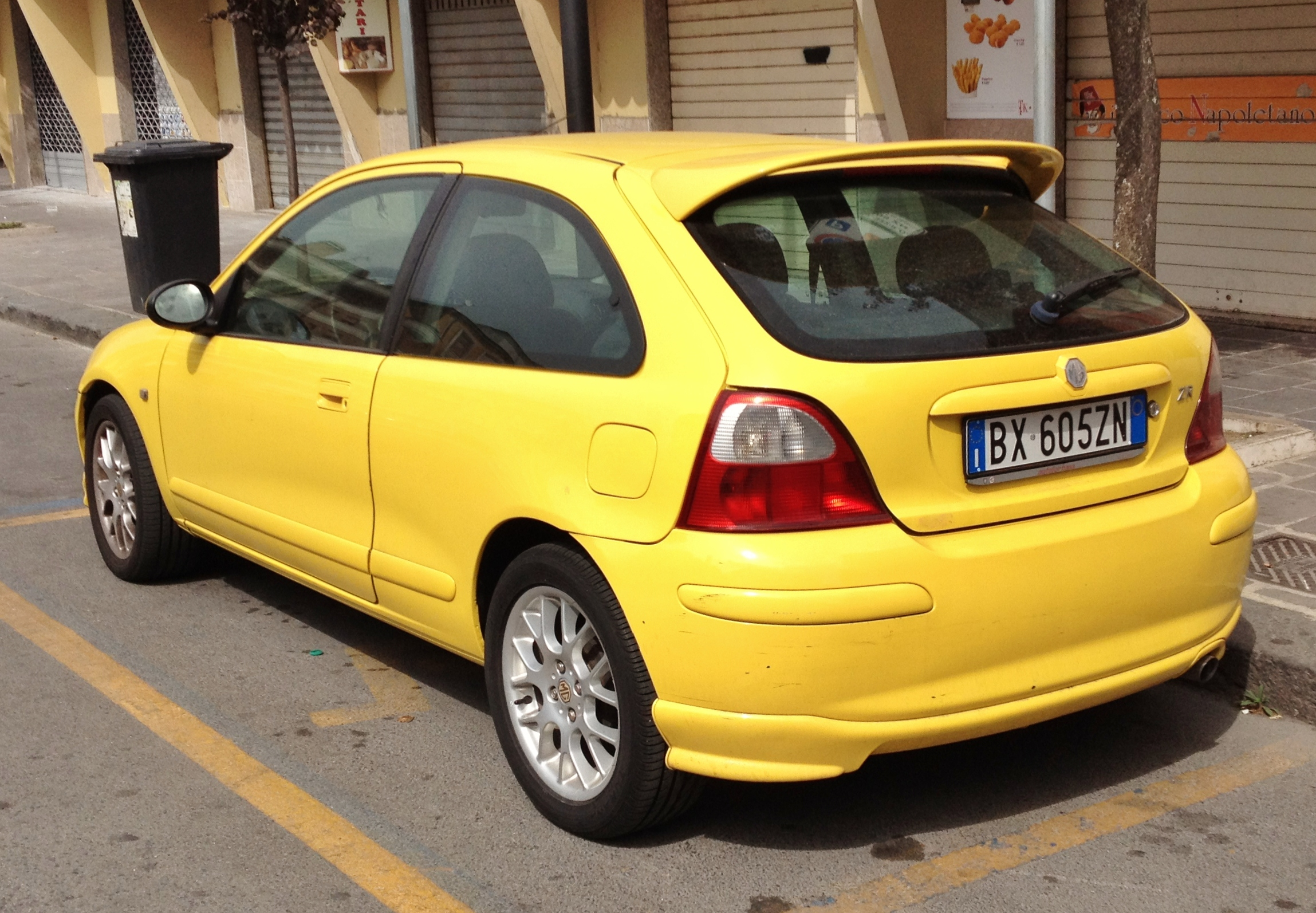
MG ZR (three door)

The range topping ZR 160 came with a 1.8 K Series VVC engine producing 159 bhp (119 kW; 161 PS) and 174 N⋅m (128 lb⋅ft) torque giving a 0–60 mph of 7.4 seconds and a top speed of 131 mph (211 km/h). This featured the most advanced brake set up available with 282mm vented front discs, and even larger solid 260mm rear discs.

There were also two diesel variants of the ZR, the first being the ZR TD 100 which had a 2.0 L Series engine producing 99 bhp (74 kW; 100 PS) and 240 N⋅m (177 lbf⋅ft) of torque, giving a 0-60 mph time of 9.7 seconds and a top speed of 114 mph (183 km/h).

The other diesel engined ZR was the TD 115 which came with the same 2.0 L series engine but with some minor performance enhancements (improved ECU map), to produce 111 bhp (83 kW; 113 PS) and 260 N⋅m (192 lbf⋅ft) of torque, which gave the car a 0–60 mph time of 9.1 seconds and a top speed of 116 mph (187 km/h).

The ZR TD 115 also came equipped with disc brakes at both the front and the rear sharing its brake set up with the ZR 120, whereas the ZR TD 100 had drums at the back, sharing its brake set up with the ZR 105.

Petrol engines
Years	Model	Engine	Power	Torque	Top speed	0–62 mph (0–100 km/h)	Economy
2001–2005	1.4 105 Manual	1,396 cc – L4 – NA	103 PS (76 kW; 102 hp)	123 N⋅m (91 lb⋅ft)	111 mph (179 km/h)	10.0 s	41.3 mpg_{‑imp} (6.84 L/100 km)
2001–2005	1.8 120 Manual	1,796 cc – L4 – NA	117 PS (86 kW; 115 hp)	160 N⋅m (118 lbf⋅ft)	119 mph (192 km/h)	8.6 s	29.8 mpg_{‑imp} (9.5 L/100 km)
2001–2005	1.8 120 Steptronic	1,796 cc – L4 – NA	117 PS (86 kW; 115 hp)	160 N⋅m (118 lbf⋅ft)	112 mph (180 km/h)	9.5 s	34.7 mpg_{‑imp} (8.1 L/100 km)
2001–2005	1.8 160 VVC Manual	1,796 cc – L4 – NA	160 PS (118 kW; 158 hp)	174 N⋅m (128 lb⋅ft)	131 mph (211 km/h)	7.4 s	37.6 mpg_{‑imp} (7.51 L/100 km)
Diesel engines
Years	Model	Engine	Power	Torque	Top Speed	0–62 mph (0–100 km/h)	Economy
2001–2005	2.0 TD Manual	1,994 cc – L4 – TC	101 PS (74 kW; 100 hp)	240 N⋅m (177 lbf⋅ft)	114 mph (183 km/h)	9.7 s	53.8 mpg_{‑imp} (5.25 L/100 km)
2001–2005	2.0 TD 115 Manual	1,994 cc – L4 – TC	113 PS (83 kW; 111 hp)	260 N⋅m (192 lbf⋅ft)	116 mph (187 km/h)	9.1 s	51.5 mpg_{‑imp} (5.49 L/100 km)

== MG Express ==
The MG Express was produced alongside the MG ZR as a car derived van. It had the same trim options and running gear as the MG ZR, with a reinforced loadspace floor and bulkhead fitted instead of the rear seats, and the rear side windows replaced with bonded panels. A total of 317 Express vans were produced.

== Facelift ==
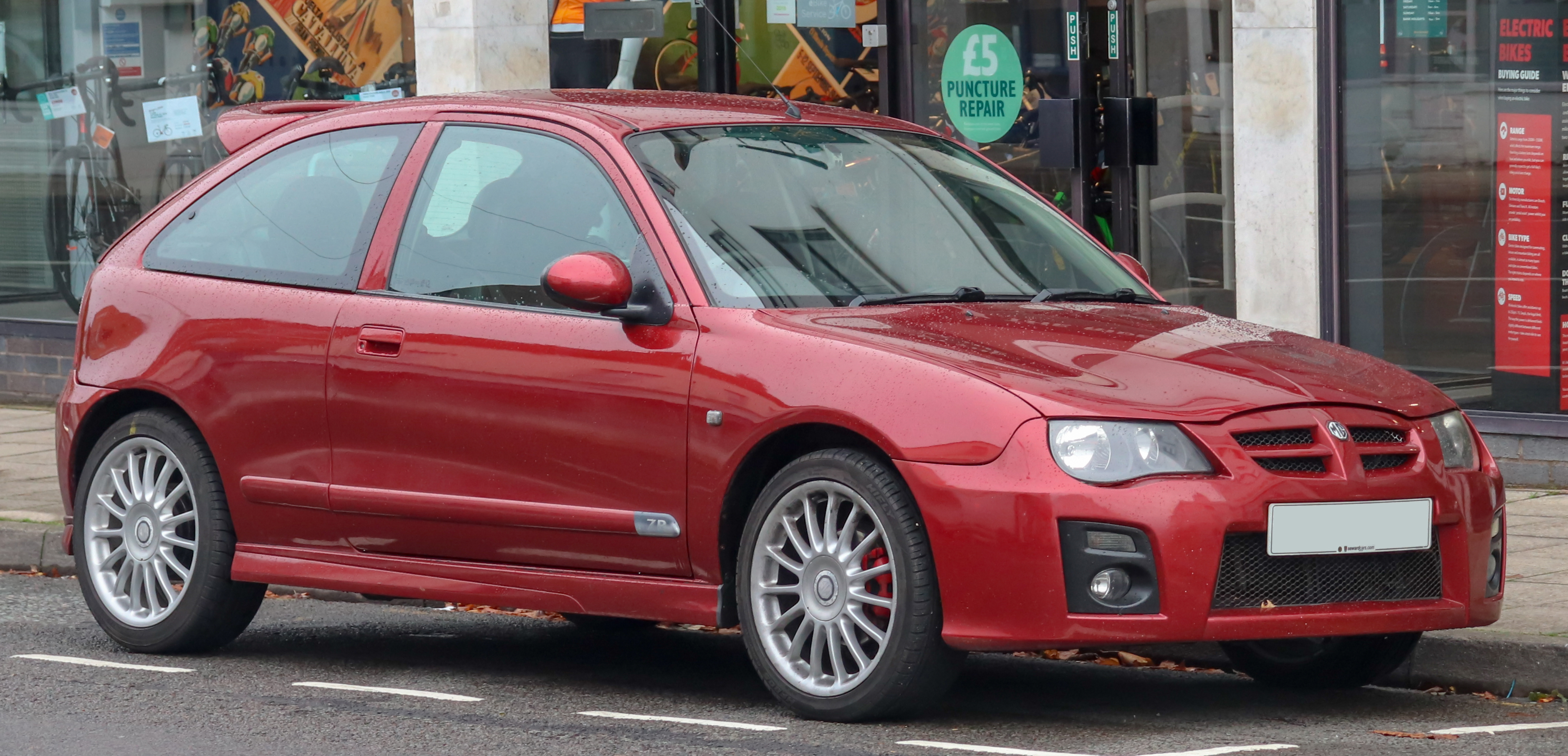
Facelift MG ZR+ 105

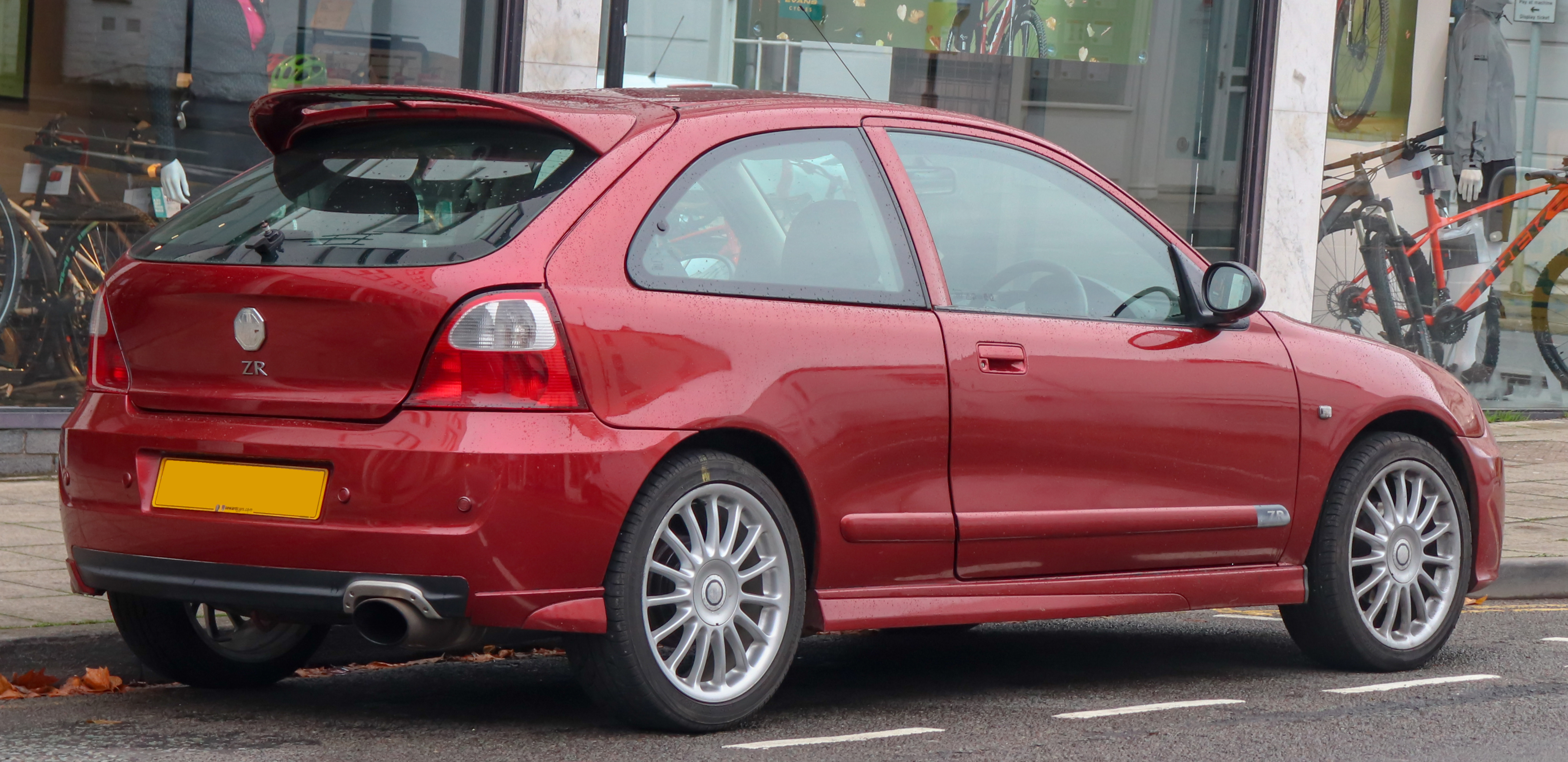
Facelift MG ZR+ 105

In January 2004, the ZR was facelifted with the rest of the MG Rover range, the new design was created by Peter Stevens, who also designed the McLaren F1. A new, more modern look was given to the car through new front and rear bumpers, headlights, tailgate, and various other exterior features.

The 2004 model also received a revised interior with new seat materials and a new dashboard design incorporating soft touch buttons. This gave the cars a far more modern feel and matched the clean, more angular lines of the exterior.

The facelifted ZR also saw the introduction of the Trophy and Trophy SE models. The MG ZR Trophy features a sunroof, 16 inch 'Grid spoke' alloy wheels, new rear light clusters, leather steering wheel, and side sill and rear bumper extensions. The Trophy SE features 17 inch 'Straights' alloy wheels and has air conditioning in the place of a sunroof.

Under the Monogram program, buyers could also select a wide range of options to customise their ZR, such as choosing optional extras from the Rover 25 list. An example of this is rear parking sensors or heated seats.

== The MG ZR's rallying history ==
The MG company produced a number of rally-based ZRs to be used in club and national rallying. MG Sport & Racing signed Gwyndaf Evans, Tony Jardine and Natalie Barratt to compete in a number of events. Some MG ZRs still rally race at international tournaments and the 2007 Rally of GB event saw Luke Pinder racing a ZR in the N1 class, and despite not driving the car before the event, he led the class after day one and went on to win his class.

== MG ZR in racing ==
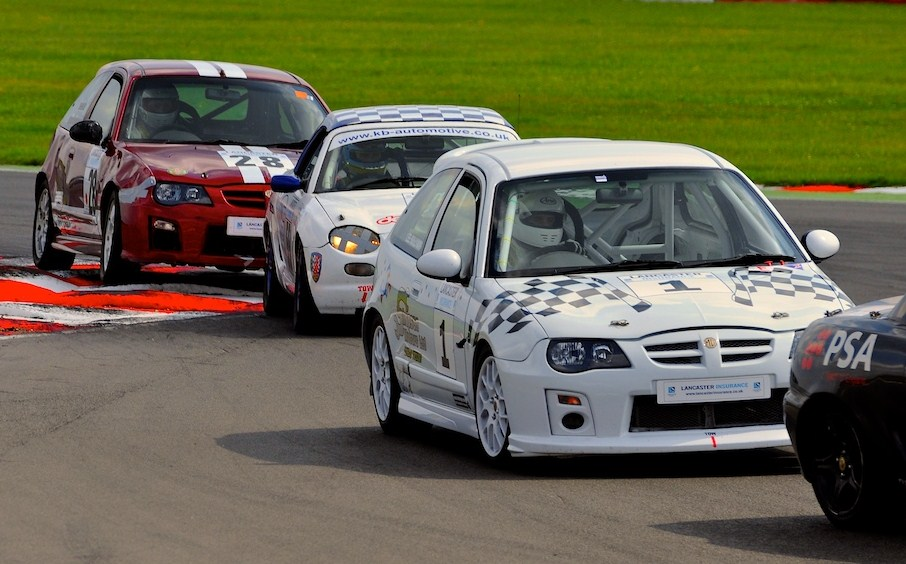
The MG ZR facelift in competition

MG Sport & Racing built two MG ZR 160's to Group N Specification for the 2003 National Saloon Car Championship. After only two events, and due to poor grids, the 'Team Airconstruct' cars were modified with dry break refueling systems and entered into the EERC Britcar Endurance Series run by James Tucker. Driven by car owner John Hammersley and teenager Andrew Dunlop, car #34 was a late entry into the Series, with only eight races remaining.

In a remarkable season, the Hammersley/Dunlop pairing scored maximum points in Britcar Class 4 in seven out of eight events, missing out on the overall title, and a perfect score, by only two points to Andy Rouse in a DTM Mercedes, and Calum Lockie in a BMW M3.

John Hammersley with son Mark took the Series win in the following year with the car, which had by then been upgraded to 'works' specification 190 bhp (142 kW; 193 PS), Group N+ Spec. The MG ZR is now raced in the MGCC in two classes, 160s and 190.

=== MG Car Club MG Trophy Championship ===
The MG Trophy is a single make club championship in the United Kingdom offering close racing for the front wheel drive MG ZR in three classes.

In 2014, the MG Car Club MG Trophy Championship saw the introduction of the ‘new’ 160 class (D) for basic road-going ZR160 cars. The previous 160 class (C) was upgraded with an ECU remap and other changes and rebranded as the 170 class. Both these changes proved to be winners, with four of the new 160's and 19 170's racing.

== MG Rover collapse ==
In April 2005, MG Rover's proposed takeover by SAIC collapsed, and the company went into receivership. Nanjing Automobile eventually bought the company's assets three months later, but when the MG range was relaunched in April 2007, the ZR and ZS were not included in the model range. It was replaced by the MG3 SW in 2008, sold to the Chinese market only.

In 2010, SAIC announced a new MG3 concept car to replace the ZR, which entered the United Kingdom in September 2013. It was initially only available with a 1.5 litre, 105 hp engine. In 2016, the MG3 received many improvements: the installation of an EU 6 derivative of the standard 1.5-litre engine developed by SAIC Motor UK, a start-stop system was fitted, and two-tone colour schemes, primarily on the red and yellow MG3's which can have either a black or white roof, were offered as options.
