= MG Car Club =

The MG Car Club Ltd
- Type: Private company limited by guarantee
- Founded: 1930
- Headquarters: Abingdon, United Kingdom
- Key people: John Day, President
- Website: http://mgcc.co.uk

The MG Car Club is an international club founded in 1930 for owners and enthusiasts of MG cars. The club headquarters is in Abingdon, Oxfordshire and is located adjacent to the now defunct MG factory site where cars were produced between 1930 - 1980. The MG Car Club currently has 55,000 affiliated members Worldwide and in 2015 the organisation celebrated its 85th anniversary.

The MGCC is a not-for-profit organisation.

== Founding ==
The first club meeting took place on 12 October 1930, at the Roebuck Hotel near Stevenage, with over thirty MG cars and their owners coming together. F.L.M. Harris was General Secretary of the M.G. Car Club and editor of The Sports Car, which suspended publication at the outbreak of World War II. Earlier he was editor of The Light Car: "Mine was the decision that caused a letter to be published in "The Light Car" suggesting the formation of an M.G. Car Club, and its inaugural meeting at the "Roebuck," Broadwater, was held within a couple of miles of my house." The suggestion came from a Roy Marsh, of Highbury, London.

The company (MG) had adopted a new sales slogan, 'Safety Fast!' late in the 1930s, and two words it seemed to embody the marque's appeal. About the same time a group of enthusiastic owners had formed the M.G Car Club.
F. Wilson McComb - MG

== History ==
The first MG Car Club sporting event took place in 1930, the Chilterns Trial. In January 1931, the first club dinner was held with Cecil Kimber as guest speaker; Kimber pledged to donate 50 guineas to club funds. In 1932 the club held the "First Show-Time Dinner-Dance at the Café Royal." Among the guests were Sir William Morris, Earl Howe, Sir Henry Birkin, Mr. G.E.T. Eyston, and Mr. Cecil Kimber.

As MG production increased, the Club continued to grow and the structure of Regional Centres came into being, extending membership of the club across the UK. A Northern Centre was formed by March 1933, and a Scottish Centre, now the Caledonian Centre, shortly after. By April 1933, the membership had topped 500 and both a Trials team and a Relay Race team had been formed, the latter taking part in the BRDC 500 Miles Race at Brooklands in September 1933, finishing in second place. A bi-monthly magazine, called M.G. Magazine, made an appearance in May, 1933, edited by Alan C. Hess, Secretary of the M.G. Car Club and former editor of Motor Sport.

In October 1942 Motor Sport announced: "F.L.M. Harris has had to resign his hon. secretaryship of the M.G. Car Club, a position he has fulfilled so extremely successfully for the past eight years, on account of increasingly heavy R.A.F. commitments." In 1945, the club was taken in-house by the MG Car Co. at Abingdon. Petrol was strictly rationed, so club motorsport was more or less non-existent. August 1951 saw the first Silverstone ‘all-Centre’ meeting, an event which still continues today. Membership continued to grow and the first overseas Centres were formed. The club was greatly strengthened by the initiation of a magazine circulated to all members, Safety Fast, compiled by F. Wilson McComb.

During the period 1960-1967 the South East Centre organised competitive events at the Firle Hill Climb in Sussex.

In the 1960s, there was a growth in Overseas membership. In 1966 The Motor reported: "The MG Car Club recently enrolled its 5,000th home member. Which, with some 4,000 overseas members, gives the club a total strength of more than 9,000 souls." As the decade drew to a close though, the relationship with the parent company—first BMC and then British Leyland—lost the closeness which had previously existed with MG. The club faced an uncertain future but Gordon Cobban, then Chairman of the South East Centre, and others worked hard to not only plan a safe financial basis for continuing but to license the club name (and that of Safety Fast) from BL. Support from UK and Overseas Centres for the new structure was vital, so in October 1969 a fully independent MG Car Club was formed, providing a basis for the club which continues today. Initially the club moved into rented offices in Abingdon but quickly became somewhat nomadic being based in Boston, Studley and Radley.

In 1979 The Guardian reported: "The MG Car Club has nine centres in the UK, and another 30 in America. The Danish club centre has just celebrated its 25th birthday, and the German centre was able to turn out 300 MGs for an event at Hausach."

The goal of the club was always to return the headquarters to Abingdon, the home of MG. In April 1988 a Building Appeal Fund was set up in order to raise money for the acquisition of a home for the club. By mid-1989, this resulted, thanks to the generosity of many club members and other benefactors, in the purchase of 11 & 12 Cemetery Road, a detached property right next to the original gate of the MG factory. Many donations in cash and in kind were vital to the renovation of the premises as suitable offices for the club, completed in 1990. The premises are now held for the use of the club by the Douglas Mickel Trust, named after Douglas Mickel OBE, the largest of the benefactors involved. The office is known as Kimber House in tribute to Cecil Kimber, the founder of the MG Car Company.

In 1995, the MGF was launched at the Geneva Motor Show, and a convoy of historic MG cars from the MG Car Club drove from Abingdon to Geneva to mark the occasion. The car quickly became the fastest selling sports car on the UK market. Thanks to a close link to the MG/Rover division of BMW through a director of the club, the club gained a whole new group of members as the MGF Register was formed. As part of this closer relationship with the manufacturer once more, the club also took on the running of the Abingdon Trophy, a speed and race championship for MGF Trophy specification cars which proved to be very popular, introducing a whole new racing car to club racing in the UK. In 2001 this relationship strengthened as the Club picked up the high-profile MGF Cup race Championship, later again adding a fleet of MG ZRs built by MG Sport & Racing. These cars now race in a championship called the Mg Trophy Championship. This championship now features the MG TF LE 500 along with road worthy MG ZR s and MGF MG TF.

In 2020, the MG Car Club launched the MG Car Club Podcast which shares stories from personalities and club members from across the MG community. The podcast, presented by the club's PR officer Wayne Scott, quickly gained popularity and now attracts thousands of listeners from around the world who download the weekly episodes to hear the latest news and interviews from the world of MG.

== Structure ==
The MG Car Club is divided into registers, centres and branches. Registers are responsible for looking after different models of MG cars. The fourteen centres organise local events in different regions of the UK. Branches organise race championship series and track days. The club's head office is based in Abingdon, where three full-time staff are based. MG Car Club directors are volunteers.

== Bibliography ==
- McComb, F. Wilson (2004). MG. MotorBooks/MBI Publishing Company. ISBN 9780760319895.
