= Longbridge plant =

Industrial complex in Birmingham, England

Coordinates: 52.39102°N 1.98820°W

SAIC Longbridge plant
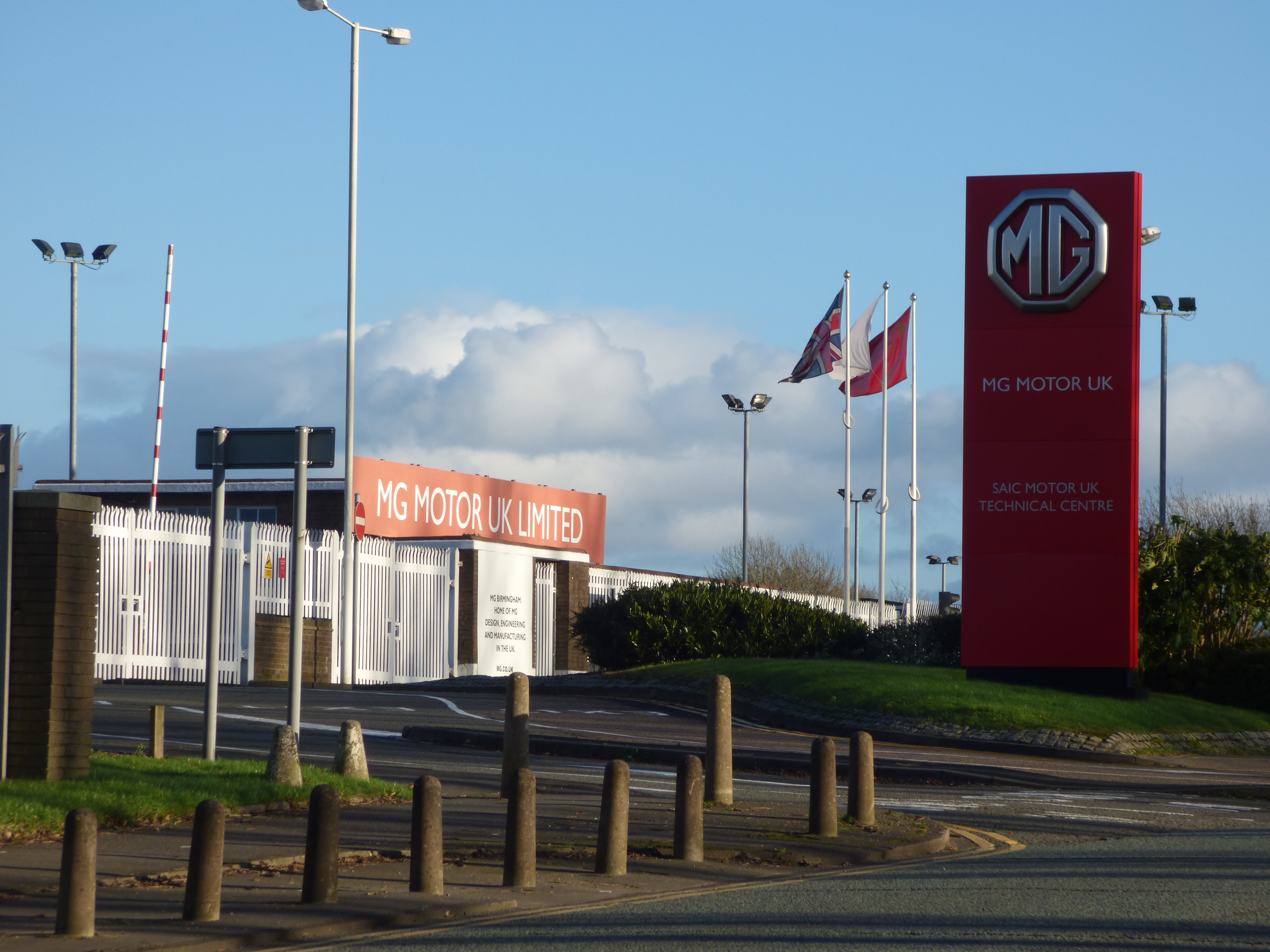
- Longbridge plant in January 2016
- Built: 1895
- Location: MG Motor UK, Lowhill Lane, Longbridge, Birmingham B31 2BQ; Longbridge, Birmingham, United Kingdom
- Industry: Automotive
- Products: See models
- Employees: 6,500 (2000–2005); 50 (2005–2008); About 400 (2008–2016); 46 (2025–present)
- Architect: Herbert Austin
- Style: Research and development plant
- Area: 69 acres (28 ha) (Remaining)
- Owners: Austin Motor Company (1906–1952); British Motor Corporation (1952–1968); British Leyland (1968–1986); Rover Group (1986–2000); MG Rover Group (2000–2005); SAIC (2005–present)

The Longbridge plant is an industrial complex in Longbridge, Birmingham, United Kingdom, currently leased by SAIC as a research and development facility for its MG Motor subsidiary.

Whilst vehicle assembly ended in 2016, the Longbridge plant currently serves as the MG Motor Technical Centre which is responsible for checking each MG vehicle which was assembled in China before being sold in Europe. Opened in 1905, by the late 1960s, Longbridge employed around 25,000 workers, building cars including the original Mini, but by April 2025, had fallen to just 46 employees.

In the Second World War, the main plant produced munitions and tank parts, while the nearby East Works of Austin Aero Ltd at Cofton Hackett produced Short Stirling and Hawker Hurricane aircraft. Since the collapse of MG Rover in 2005, part of the site has been redeveloped for commercial and residential use.

== History ==
=== White and Pike (1895–1901) ===
The original site and factory development was undertaken by Birmingham-based copper-plate printers White and Pike Ltd. Looking to consolidate a number of small sites around Birmingham, and diversify into new areas, they chose a series of 20 agricultural fields in Northfield eight miles to the south of the city on the Bristol Road at Longbridge. The site was bounded by Lickey Road, Lowhill Lane, the Midland Railway's main Birmingham to Gloucester mainline, and the Halesowen Joint Railway with the Great Western Railway. The purchase also included Cofton Hill, which rose 70 feet (21 m) above its surroundings. Designed by Stark & Rowntree of Glasgow and constructed by James Moffatt & Sons of Camp Hill, the factory was built at a cost of £105,000, opening in the first quarter of 1895. Unfortunately, the venture failed, and the site was repossessed by the bank in 1901.

=== Austin (1906–1914) ===
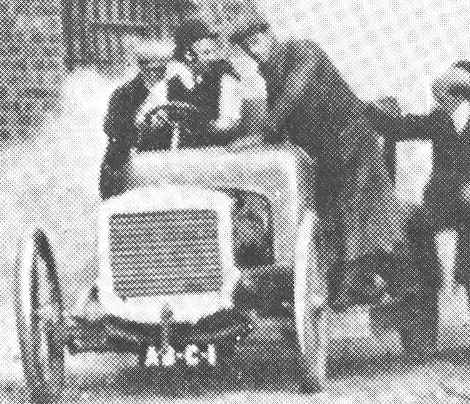
"Coming down the alley all aboard" The first Austin, a 25-30, sets out for the Lickey Hills on its first trial run. Herbert Austin at the wheel. Saturday 7 April 1906

Herbert Austin, who was born in Buckinghamshire and raised in Yorkshire, escaped his intended railway engineering apprenticeship and learnt his trade under an uncle in Melbourne, Australia. He returned to England in 1893 as manager of an Australian company relocating to Birmingham. In 1901, with the Vickers brothers, he founded and ran Wolseley Tool and Motor Car Company, which became Britain's largest car manufacturer.

In 1905, he fell out with the Vickers brothers, and looking to found his own motor car company, Herbert Austin undertook numerous exploratory rides around Birmingham in his Wolseley 7.5-horsepower. On 4 November 1905, he found the derelict printing works, owned by a financier, E A Olivieri. Friends came forward with financial help, and with additional invoice financing from Frank Kayser of Kayser, Ellison and Company, and William Harvey du Cros of the Dunlop Rubber Company, enabled Austin to buy the site and an additional 8 acres (3.2 ha) from Olivieri for £7,500 on 22 January 1906.

Austin and his initial workforce of the Austin Motor Company had, in fact, moved into the derelict buildings before this date, as Austin was so focused on showing his new car at the British Motor Show, to be held in November 1906 at Olympia, London. On paper, the first Austin was described as a 25-30 h.p. high-class touring car with a four-speed gearbox and a chain-driven transmission. Each car had a material and quality guarantee and the first car was produced at the end of March 1906, at a price of £650. Some 50 hands were employed during the first year and they produced about a dozen cars.

By 1908, 1,000 workers were at a factory, which covered 4 acres (1.6 ha); a night shift was introduced to help create adequate supply to meet the rising demand for products. By September 1912, workshops covered more than 8 acres, output was running at 1,000 cars a year and employee numbers were 1,800. Austin built their own bodies and their coachbuilding department was one of the largest in the country. They built their own artillery wood wheels and made the hubs for wire-spoked and pressed-steel wheels. In February 1914, the company was floated as a public company and £250,000 of new preference shares were issued to the public and listed on the stock exchanges.

The new funding paid for the construction of additional workshops and the transition of the plant from mechanical drive with its great shafts and belts to electric drive. Two four-cylinder vertical gas engines of 200 horsepower (150 kW) each, designed by the Anderson Foundry Co. of Glasgow, coupled to three-phase alternators built by Allmänna Svenska Elektriska Aktiebolaget of Sweden, provided the electricity.

=== Workforce and site expansion ===
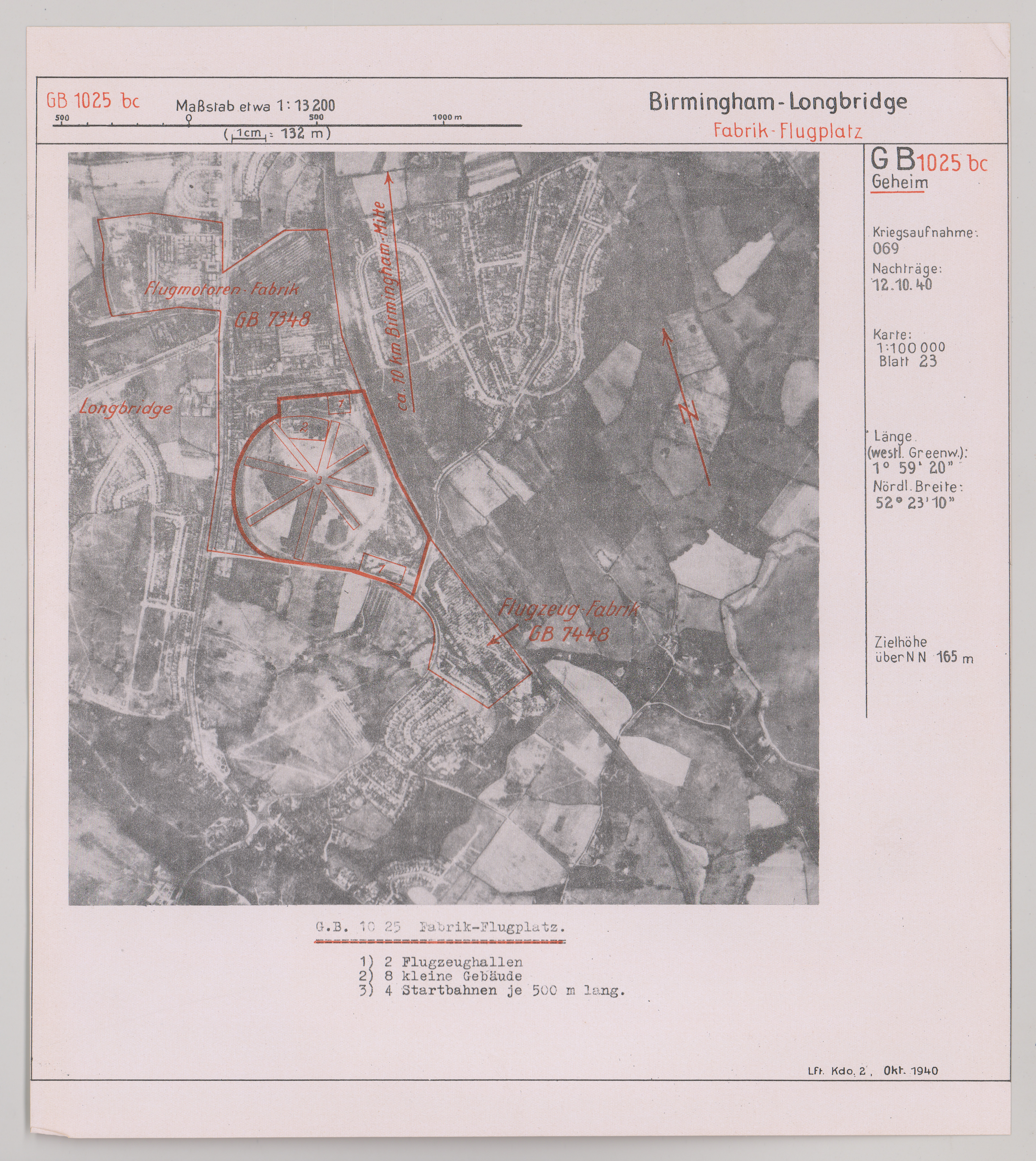
Target dossier of the German Luftwaffe highlighting the airfield, the aircraft- and the aircraft engine plant, 1940

The Longbridge plant was part of a significant rapid mobilisation process, which took place across Europe on the outbreak of World War I. Machines that had been used to build Austin cars were employed to produce munitions, and all the resources of the factory were harnessed to serve the armed forces. As the demand for weapons and equipment of every kind continued to increase, the factory was expanded. The area between the existing buildings and the Midland Railway mainline were built on. The expansion also enabled the 1915 construction of Longbridge railway station within the boundaries of the works, allowing the Midland Railway to run workers' trains direct from Birmingham New Street. By 1917, the factory site trebled in size, and possessed its own flying ground at Cofton Hackett, south of the main works, which was operated by the newly formed Austin Aero Company. The employees, many of whom were women, rose to over 22,000 during the peak years.

Between 1914 and 1918, over 8,000,000 shells were produced along with 650 guns, 2,000 aeroplanes, 2,500 aero engines, and 2,000 trucks. In recognition of this, Herbert Austin was knighted in 1917 and he was also honoured by Belgium for employing 3,000 Belgian refugees at Longbridge. With the need to expand capacity, the company bought Longbridge farm. Located north of the existing site, it became known as Longbridge North works, bounded again by the railways, Bristol Road, and Longbridge Lane.

The works and plant had grown to over 10 times their prewar size; no peace-time products were being made. The Armistice terminated the war suddenly, contracts were cancelled at very short notice. Major wartime additions to plant included a large steel foundry, a very large sheet-metal pressings shop, and a very large and complete hardening and heat-treatment shop. On the outbreak of World War II, the factory was mobilised again. The manufacturing of cars was largely abandoned and the machines were turned to the production of armour-piercing ammunition for the QF 2-pounder, QF 6-pounder, and QF 17-pounder antitank guns, steel boxes, jerrycans, mines, depth charges, and helmets.

=== Changes and nationalisation (1946–1980) ===
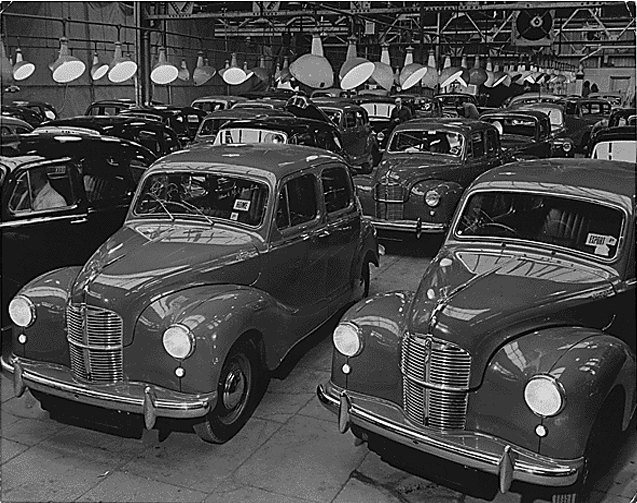
Photo taken at Longbridge in 1948

After the war, Leonard Lord took over as chairman. He laid plans for a rapid expansion, new models, and overseas marketing. In June 1946, the millionth Austin was produced. It was painted in a matte cream and signed by the chairman and the workpeople at a special celebration.

Austin collaborated with Jensen Motors to manufacture the Austin A40 Sports, an aluminium-bodied, four-passenger convertible — with bodies manufactured by Jensen - not at their West Bromwich plant - but at another site in Pensnett, near Dudley - and transferred to Longbridge for final assembly. Later Austin collaborated with the Donald Healey Motor Company on the Healey 100. In 1952, Austin was amalgamated with Morris Motors Limited and became BMC. Harold Wilson's government arranged for BMC to be amalgamated into British Leyland in 1968.

=== Nationalisation ===
The British Leyland company ran into financial difficulties and was refinanced by the government in 1975. The government thus became the dominant shareholder, but unlike most nationalised industries, British Leyland (later called BL) remained a public company.

Derek Robinson, or "Red Robbo" as he was dubbed by the media, became synonymous with the strikes that severely affected production at the Longbridge plant in Birmingham in the 1970s. Between 1978 and 1979, the then government-owned British Leyland attributed 523 disputes to Robinson, the factory convenor at Longbridge. However, Robinson's responsibility for these incidents, most of which were brief stoppages led by individual shop stewards, has been overstated. He was eventually sacked amid intense press attacks. Many of the votes for strikes were cast in Cofton Park opposite Q-Gate.

Expansion work at Longbridge was completed in 1979 to allow a new assembly line for the forthcoming new supermini car, which was launched in 1980 as the Austin Metro. The Metro was in production virtually unchanged for 10 years, becoming one of the most popular cars ever to be produced at the plant. The major part of the expansion was the erection of "New West Works", where the body shells were assembled, with extensive robotic input - a first for British Leyland. The shells were then carried on an enclosed conveyor over the Bristol Road to the Car Assembly Buildings in South Works, where the cars were assembled and tested. This arrangement endured until car production at Longbridge ceased in 2005. Indeed, the overhead conveyor bridge was one of the first features to go when demolition of the plant began.

=== Privatisation and liquidation (1980–1994) ===
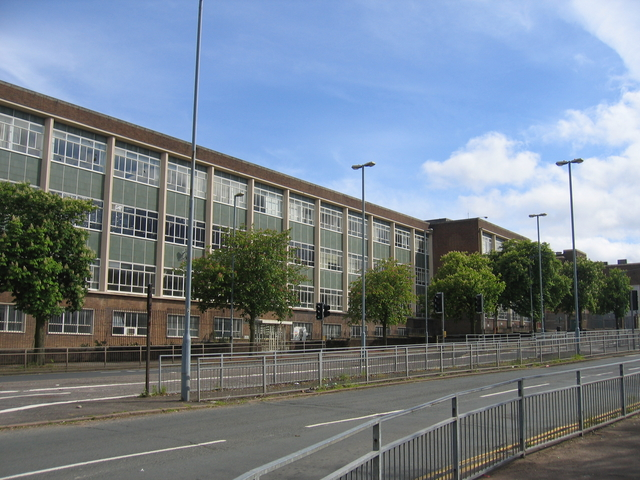
Offices at the plant

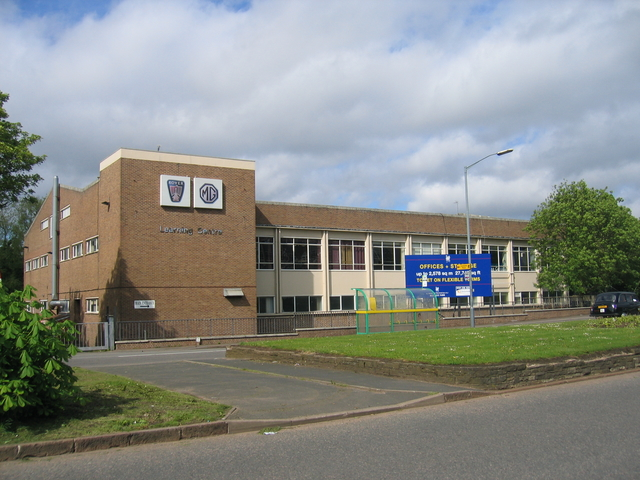
The Learning Centre

By the 1980s, BL had been severely rationalised, and many businesses and other factories within its empire had either been closed or sold off. It had also entered into a collaborative deal with Japanese firm Honda, which gave BL a new lease on life and Honda entry into the UK market. The Austin Metro, which was introduced in 1980 and then relaunched in 1990 as an updated model under the Rover marque, was easily the most successful product to be produced at Longbridge in the final quarter of the 20th century. In 1988, the Longbridge plant, along with the rest of Austin Rover, was sold to British Aerospace, which renamed it as the Rover Group in 1989.

In 1989, a new Longbridge-built model was launched, the second-generation Rover 200 (the original version had been launched in 1984). The 200 series was sold in the hatchback, coupe, and cabriolet body styles, and also formed the basis of the Rover 400 saloon and estate. It was consistently one of the most popular small family cars sold in Britain throughout its production life, and remained a common sight on British roads for many years after it ceased production. The 200 and 400 were replaced by all-new models in 1995, this time being completely separate model ranges, with the new Rover 400 being derived from the Honda Civic.

=== BMW & MG Rover Group (1994–2005) ===
In 1994 BMW, fearful of their small size relative to their rivals in a progressively globalised car market, bought Rover Group and the Longbridge plant passed into the hands of BMW, but continuing heavy losses alarmed BMW shareholders, and in 2000, Rover Cars and the Longbridge factory were sold to the Phoenix Consortium, which renamed it MG Rover Group, in a management buyout for the token sum of £10.

At the time, many financial commentators claimed that the plant was not modern enough and that the company would surely run out of money within a few years. In April 2005, this happened; the Phoenix Consortium put the MG Rover group into administration, leaving more than 6,000 workers without jobs. Another factor in MG Rover's meltdown was that it had not launched an all-new model since the Rover 75 more than six years earlier. In contrast, the likes of Ford and Vauxhall, and indeed most other Western European mass-market carmakers, had replaced most if not all of their model ranges since the late 1990s.

=== SAIC ownership (2005–present) ===
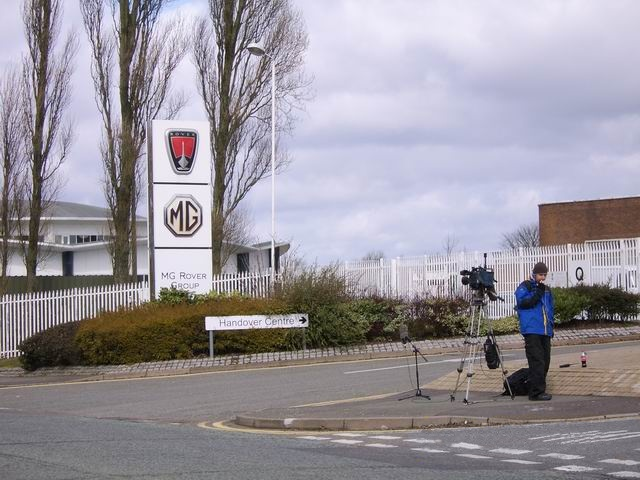
Longbridge gates in 2006.

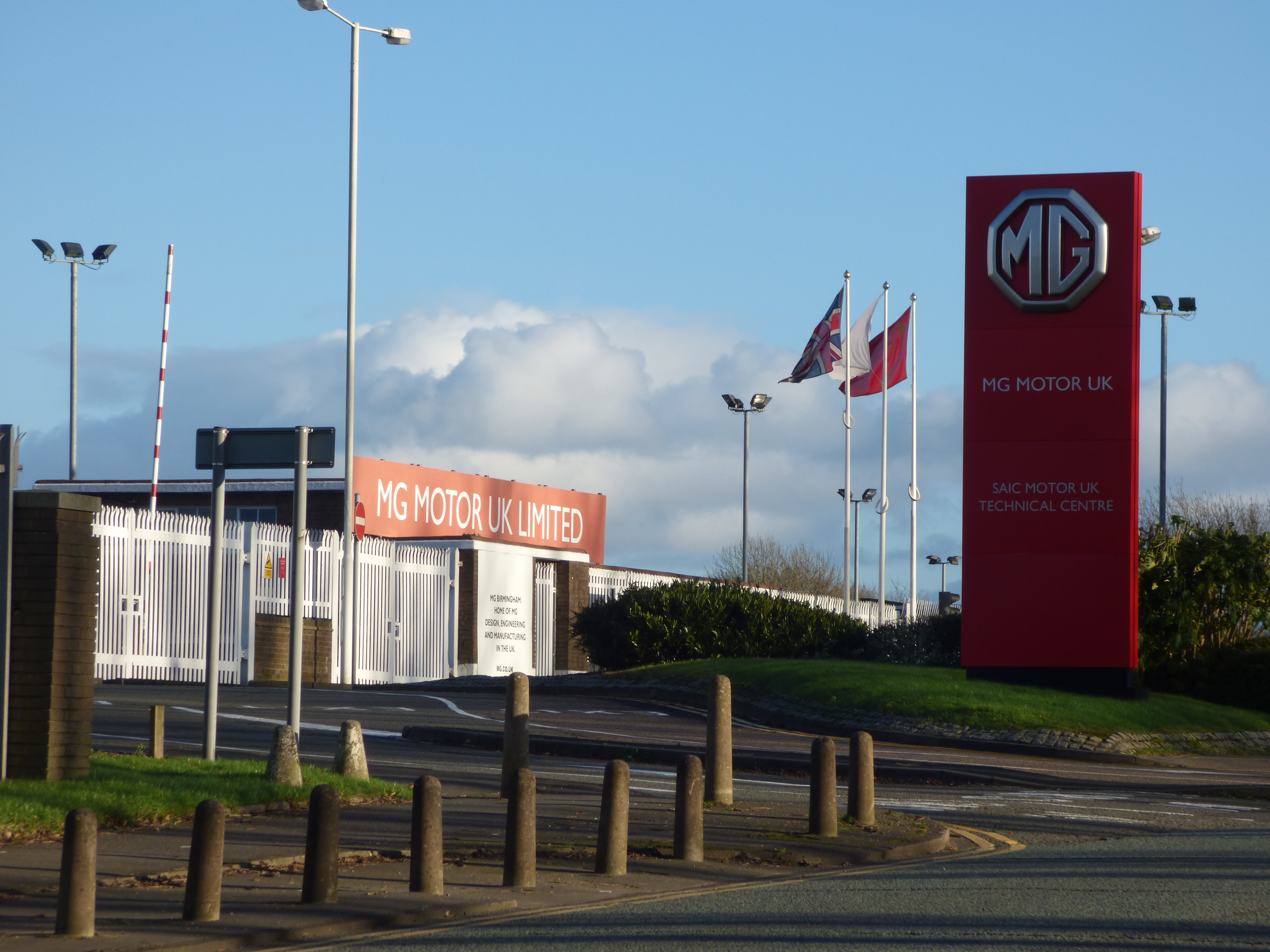
Longbridge as the MG Motor UK Technical Centre

Chinese automobile company Nanjing acquired the remaining assets of MG Rover, including the lease to the Longbridge plant, three months after it went into receivership. In August 2008, MG TF production restarted, some three years after the collapse of MG Rover, using only part of the old Austin works, Austin's original South Works. Most of the rest of the site has since been demolished for redevelopment, including a new local centre, south of Longbridge Lane.

The scaled-down car plant at Longbridge had less production capacity than before. More than half the factory site was sold off and cleared, and the land restored to provide land for homes and businesses with a target of creating 10,000 jobs and 1,450 homes.

Nanjing Automotive Corporation was acquired by Shanghai Automotive Industry Corporation (SAIC) during late 2007 into 2008, resulting in the Longbridge site coming under the ownership of SAIC. The UK engineering function known as SAIC Motor Technical Centre UK (SMTC) was moved from its site in Leamington into the Longbridge during 2008. In 2010, the SMTC was unveiled showing the engineering areas and styling studio.

During this time, the engineers at Longbridge had worked on the MG 6, which was based on the Roewe 550 to make it ready for UK launch. MG Motors was created as the UK manufacturing company for SAIC, and in April 2011, began manufacturing the MG 6 from semiknocked-down (SKD) kits that come from the SAIC Lingang Plant China. The cars arrive from China, essentially complete, requiring only the fitting of engine and front suspension, nose trim, and wheels at Longbridge, which no longer has functional body welding/assembly or paint shops. Production of the MG TF was discontinued around this time, with a mere 906 having been built at Longbridge since production restarted almost three years previously. Production of the MG 3 supermini began at Longbridge in 2012, and by 2014, the plant employed around 400 workers, up from just over 200 people who were there when production restarted.

The new MG GS SUV was due to be launched in May 2016, and body kits were arriving in a readymade format. The rear suspension as found on the VW Tiguan was to be fitted in Longbridge, as well as the engine and UK-specification dashboard. Any factory extras such as HID headlights, would also be stored and fitted at the Longbridge plant. Various parts of the 4x4 system, including parts to the rear axle, would have been fitted in the UK.

On 23 September 2016, MG announced that all car production had ceased at Longbridge. Henceforth, all MG vehicles would be imported into the UK.

Starting on 19 January 2020, the last surviving assembly buildings CAB1 and CAB2, and the paint shop are to be mostly demolished to make way for further new housing, although parts of the buildings are to be retained. The former production facility will now only be used to sell cars and research and development of future models.

== Models produced at Longbridge ==
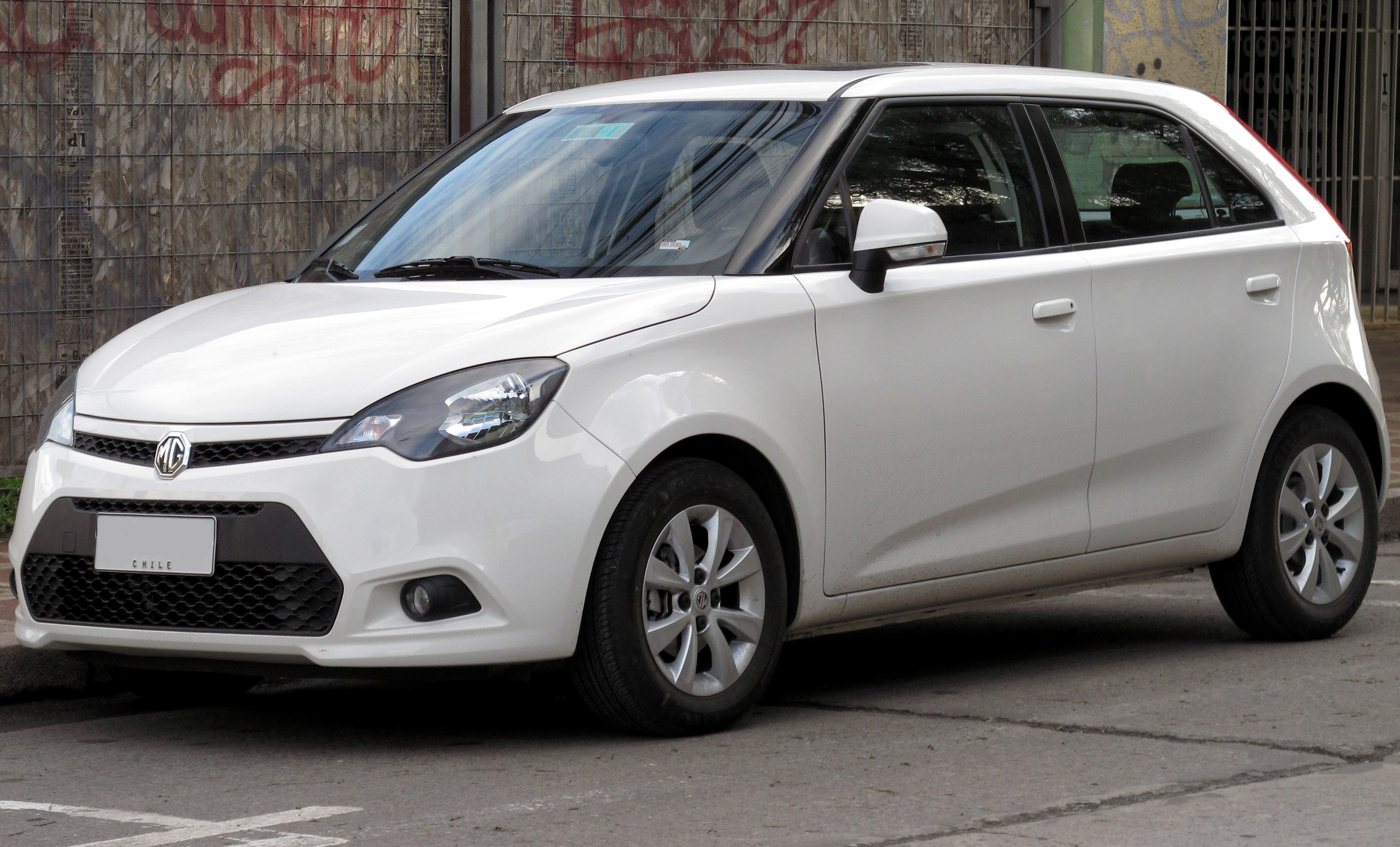
MG 3 (2011–2016)

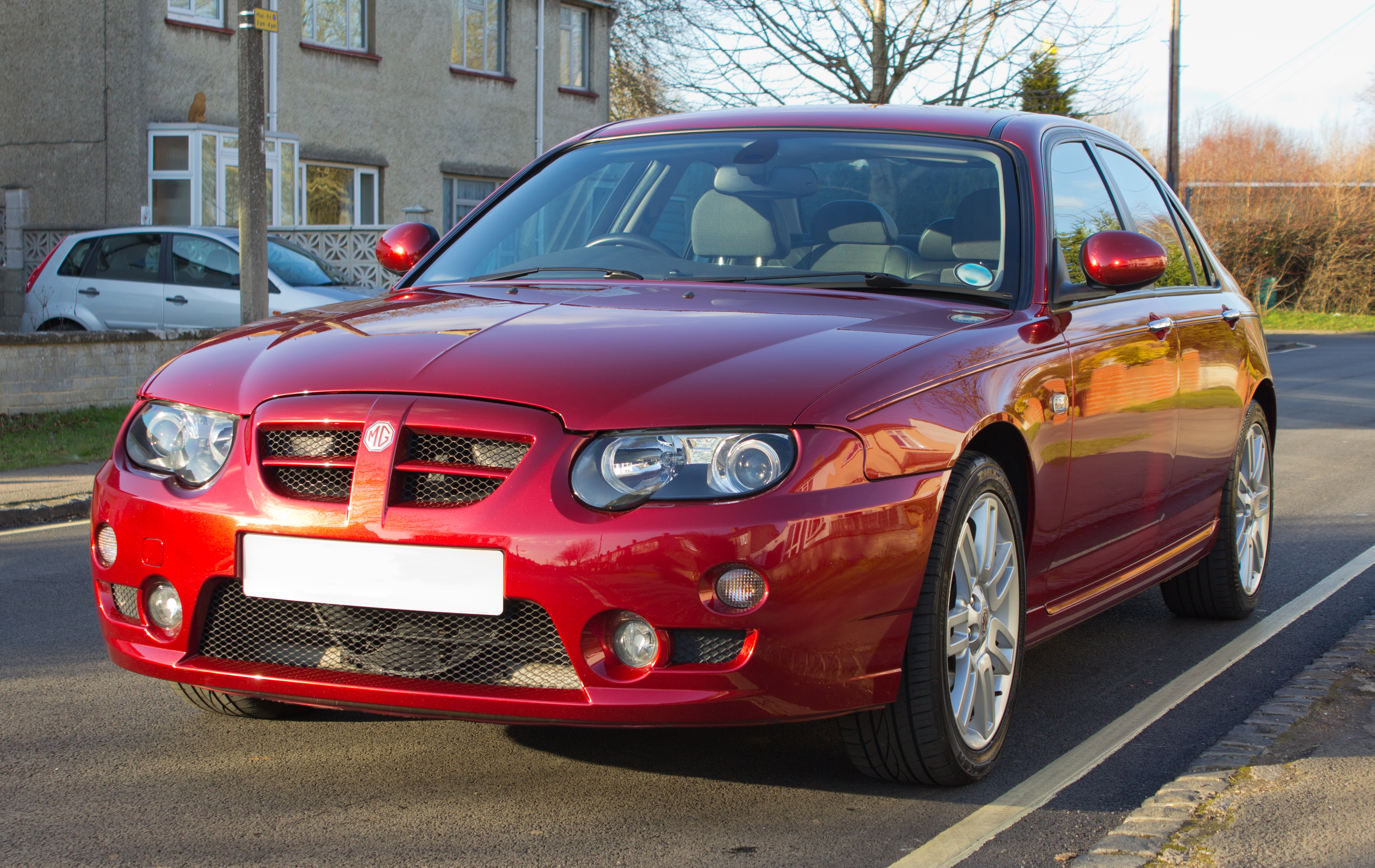
MG ZT (2001–2005)

- MG 6 (2010–2016)
- MG 3 (2011–2016)
- Rover 75 (previously)
- Rover 45 (previously)
- Rover 25 (previously)
- Rover Streetwise (previously)
- MG ZT (previously)
- MG F (previously)
- MG TF (previously)
- MG SV (previously)
- MG ZS (previously)
- MG ZR (previously)
- Rover 400 (previously)
- Rover 200 (previously)
- Rover 100 (previously)
- Rover Mini (previously)
- Rover (previously)
- MG (currently)
- Mini (until 2000)
- Austin Motor Company (previously)
- British Leyland (previously)

== Popular culture ==
Shortly before MG Rover went into administration in 2005, The Chemical Brothers' video for their single "Believe" contained scenes filmed inside the Longbridge factory.

Also, images from the Longbridge production line and from the Mini were used to introduce the United Kingdom's entry in the 1998 Eurovision Song Contest hosted at the city of Birmingham.

Several references to the Longbridge plant – where some characters work – are made in the novel The Rotters' Club and its sequels The Closed Circle and Middle England by Jonathan Coe.
