= MG3 (automobile) =

Supermini car

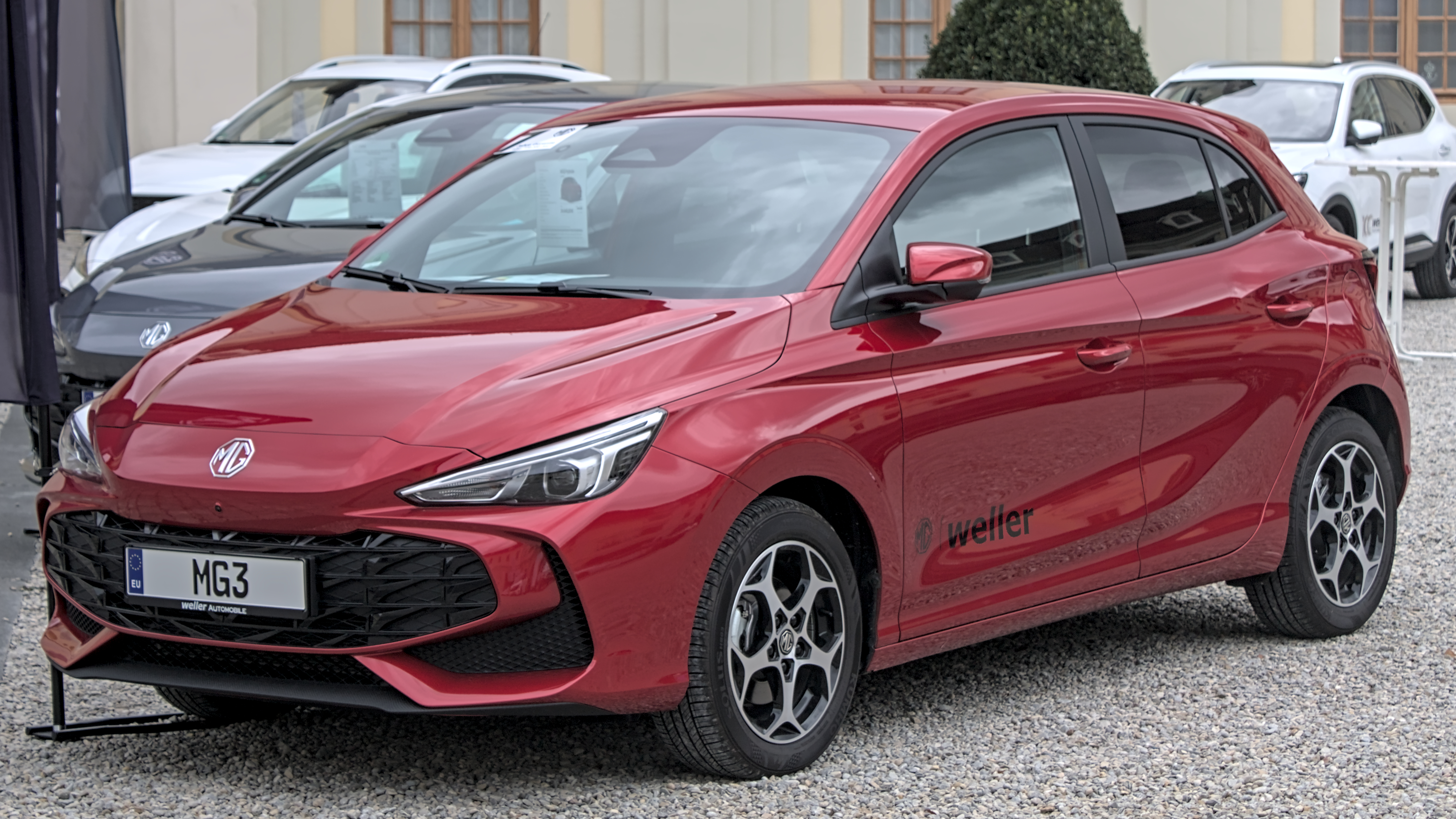
- Third generation MG3

Overview
- Manufacturer: SAIC Motor, MG Motor
- Production: 2008–present

Body and chassis
- Class: Supermini (B)
- Body style: 5-door hatchback
- Layout: Front-engine, front-wheel-drive

Chronology
- Predecessor: MG ZR; Rover 25

The MG3 is a supermini car produced by the Chinese automotive company SAIC under the British MG marque. The first generation, marketed as the MG3 SW, is based on the British-made Rover Streetwise, which itself was based on the Rover 25, while since the second generation, introduced in 2011 is marketed simply as the MG3.

== First generation (2008) ==
First generation
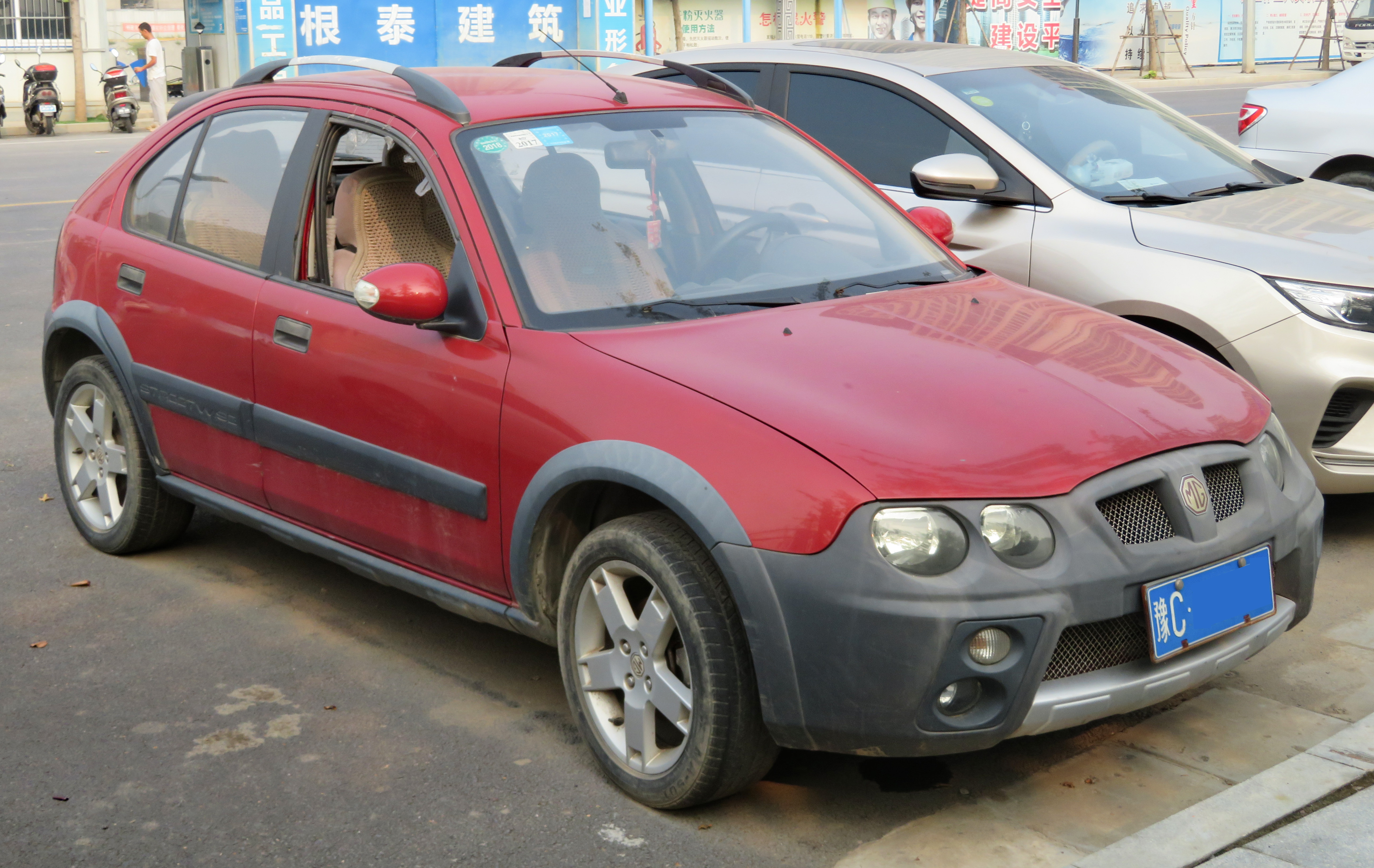

Overview
- Production: 2008–2011
- Assembly: China: Nanjing (NAC)
- Designer: Peter Stevens

Body and chassis
- Related: Rover Streetwise

Powertrain
- Engine: 1.4 L N/K-Series I4

Dimensions
- Wheelbase: 2,500 mm (98.4 in)
- Length: 3,980 mm (156.7 in)
- Width: 1,736 mm (68.3 in)
- Height: 1,495 mm (58.9 in)

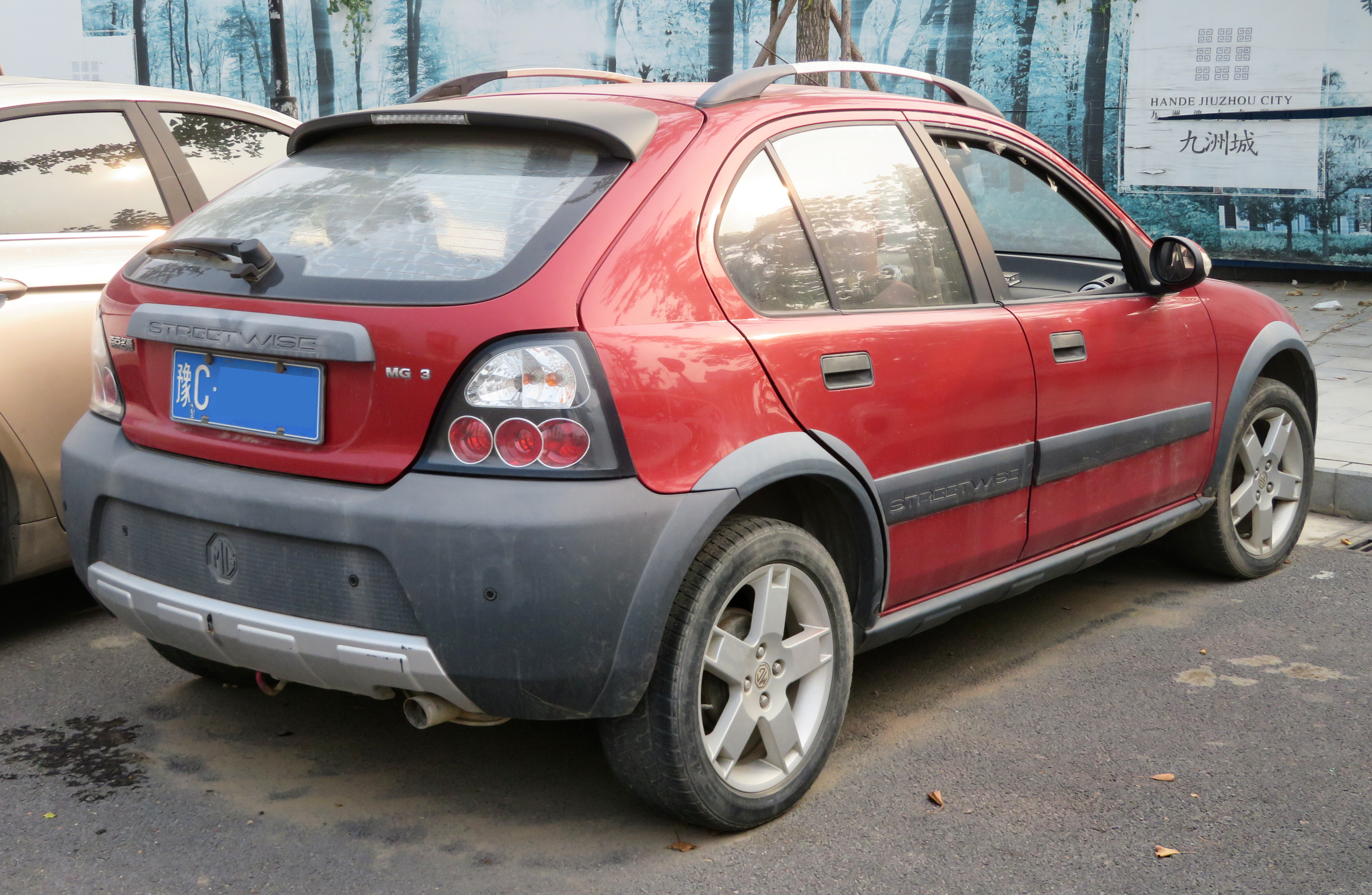
Rear view

The first generation MG3 SW is essentially a rebadged version of the Rover Streetwise, which had ceased production in April 2005 after the bankruptcy of predecessor organisation MG Rover. It started production in 2008 at SAIC's Chinese factory in Pukou, Nanjing. The MG3 SW was only sold in China, and cannot be exported by SAIC.

=== Engines ===
Petrol engines
Model	Engine	Displacement	Power	Torque	Top Speed	0–60 mph (0–97 km/h)	CO_{2} emissions
1.4 N/K-Series	I4	1,396 cc	76 kW (103 PS; 102 hp) at 6,000 rpm	123 N⋅m (91 lb⋅ft) at 4,500 rpm	115 mph (185 km/h)	9.7s	___ g/km

== Second generation (2011) ==
Second generation
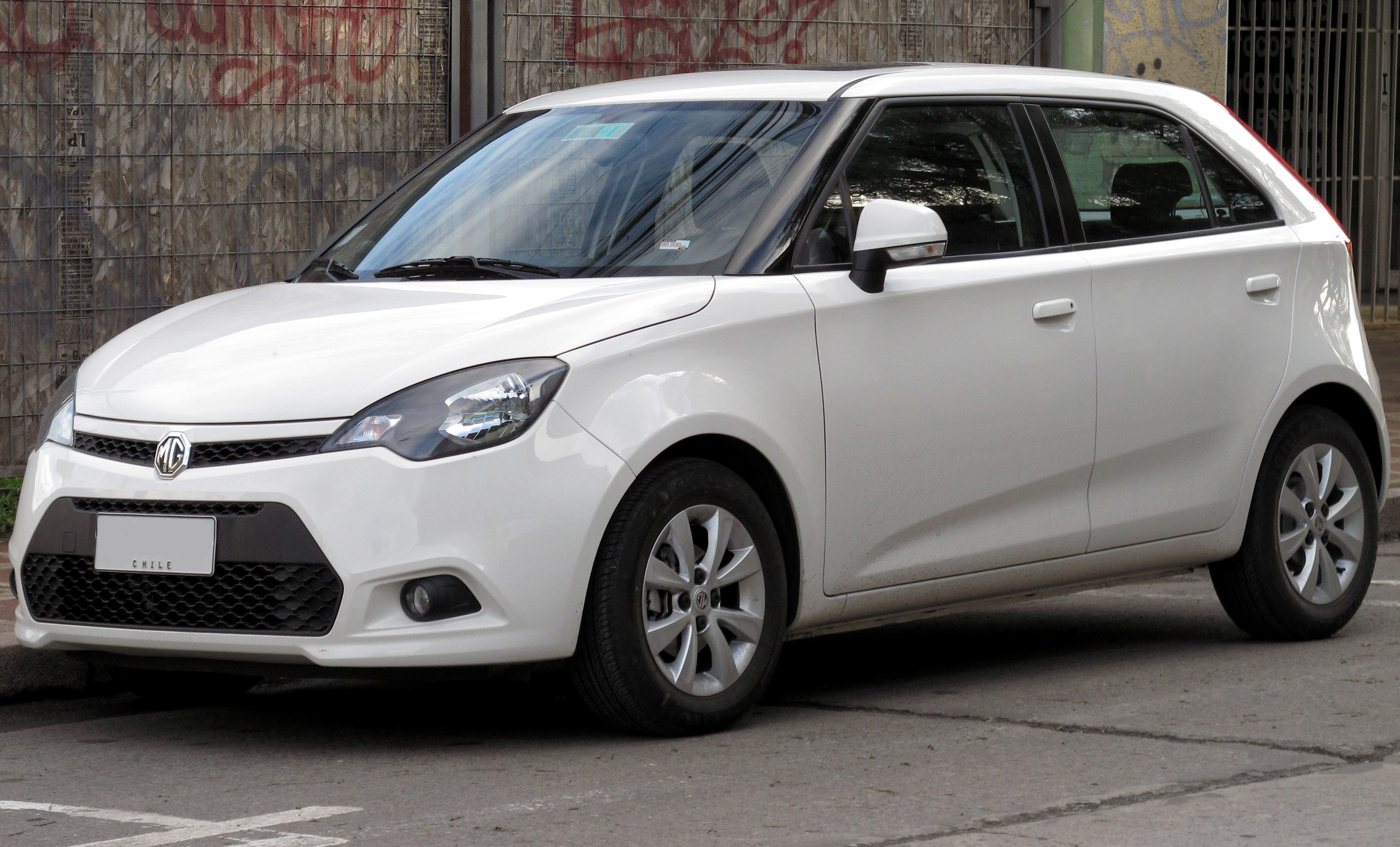

Overview
- Model code: ZP11
- Production: 2011–2024
- Assembly: China: Nanjing (NAC); United Kingdom: Birmingham (Longbridge plant; all parts, until 2016); Thailand: Laem Chabang (SAIC-CP)
- Designer: Anthony Williams-Kenny

Powertrain
- Engine: 1.3 L 13S4C VTi Tech I4 (petrol); 1.5 L 15S4C VTi Tech I4 (petrol); 1.5 L 15S4C VTi Tech I4 (FFV petrol; Thailand)
- Transmission: 5-speed manual 5-speed MG AMT SeleMatic automated manual 4-speed automatic

Dimensions
- Wheelbase: 2,520 mm (99.2 in)
- Length: 4,018–4,079 mm (158.2–160.6 in)
- Width: 1,728–1,739 mm (68.0–68.5 in)
- Height: 1,507–1,528 mm (59.3–60.2 in)

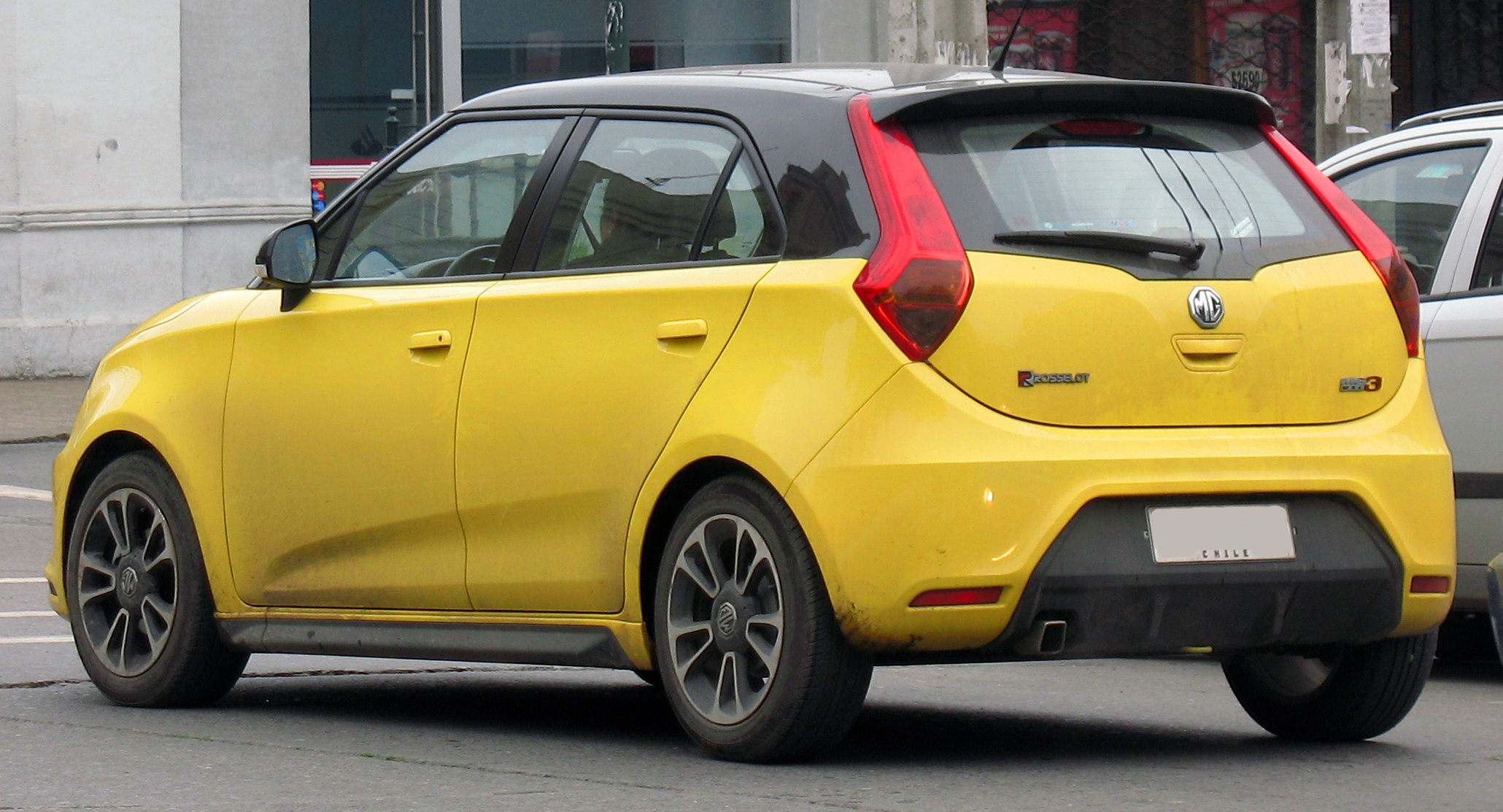
MG3 (pre-facelift, Chile)

The second-generation MG3 was shown at the 2010 Beijing Auto Show, in the form of the MG Zero concept car. The new model uses an all new automotive platform with a wheelbase of 2.5 m, featuring MacPherson strut front suspension and a torsion beam rear axle. The development work took place in the United Kingdom, with production initially in China.

The car went on sale in China in the spring of 2011. Engine options at launch consist of a choice of 1.3 (1343 cc) and 1.5 litre (1498 cc), rated at 68 kW (91 bhp) and 80 kW (107 bhp) respectively, with either a five speed manual transmission, or an Italian AMT transmission called e-shift.

=== MG 3 Xross ===
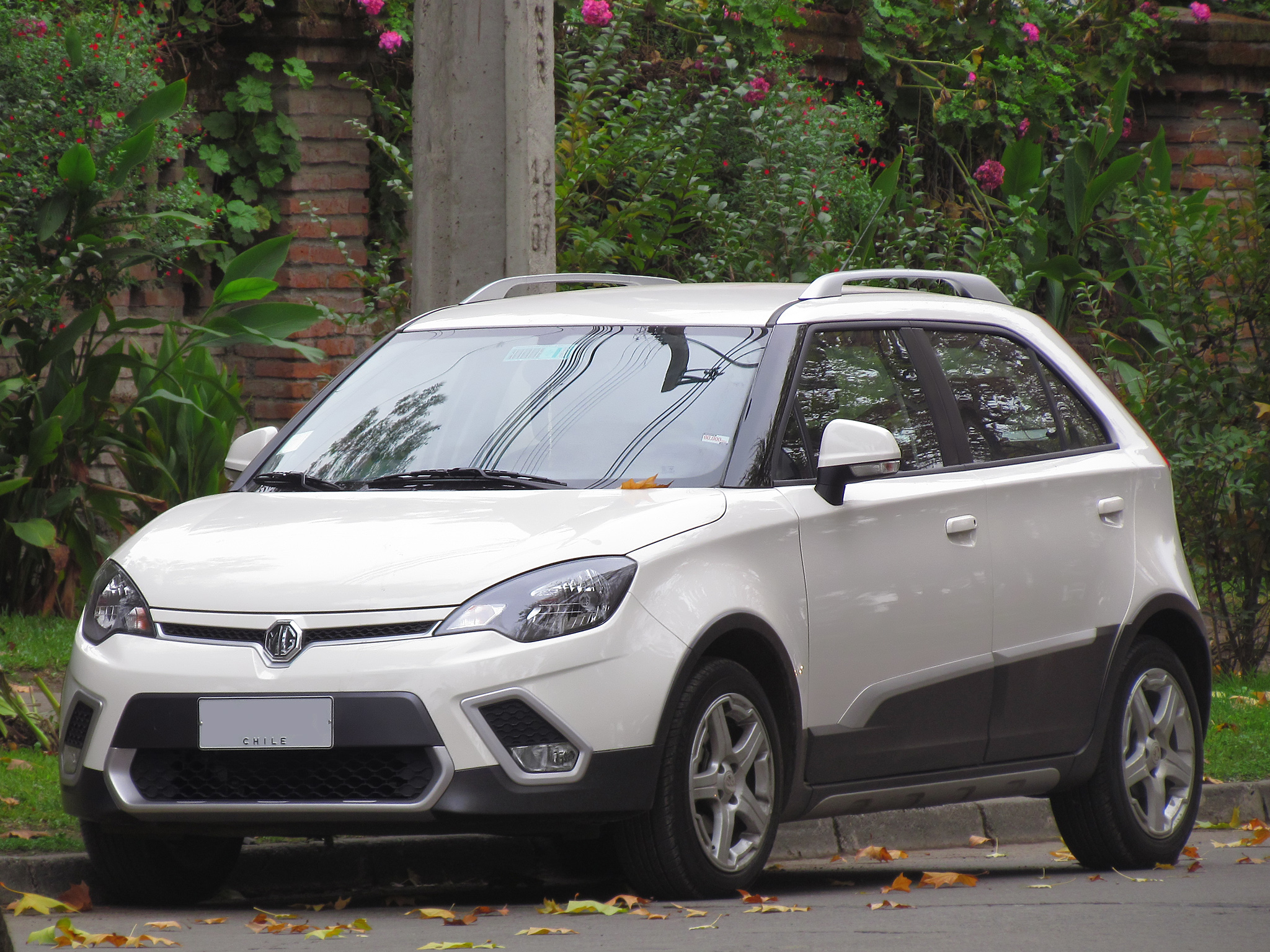
MG3 (facelift, Chile)

The second generation MG3 is also available in a crossover style variant (similar to the Rover Streetwise and MG3 SW), known as the MG3 Xross. The Xross is only available with the 80 kW (107 hp) 1.5 litre engine.

=== First facelift (2013) ===
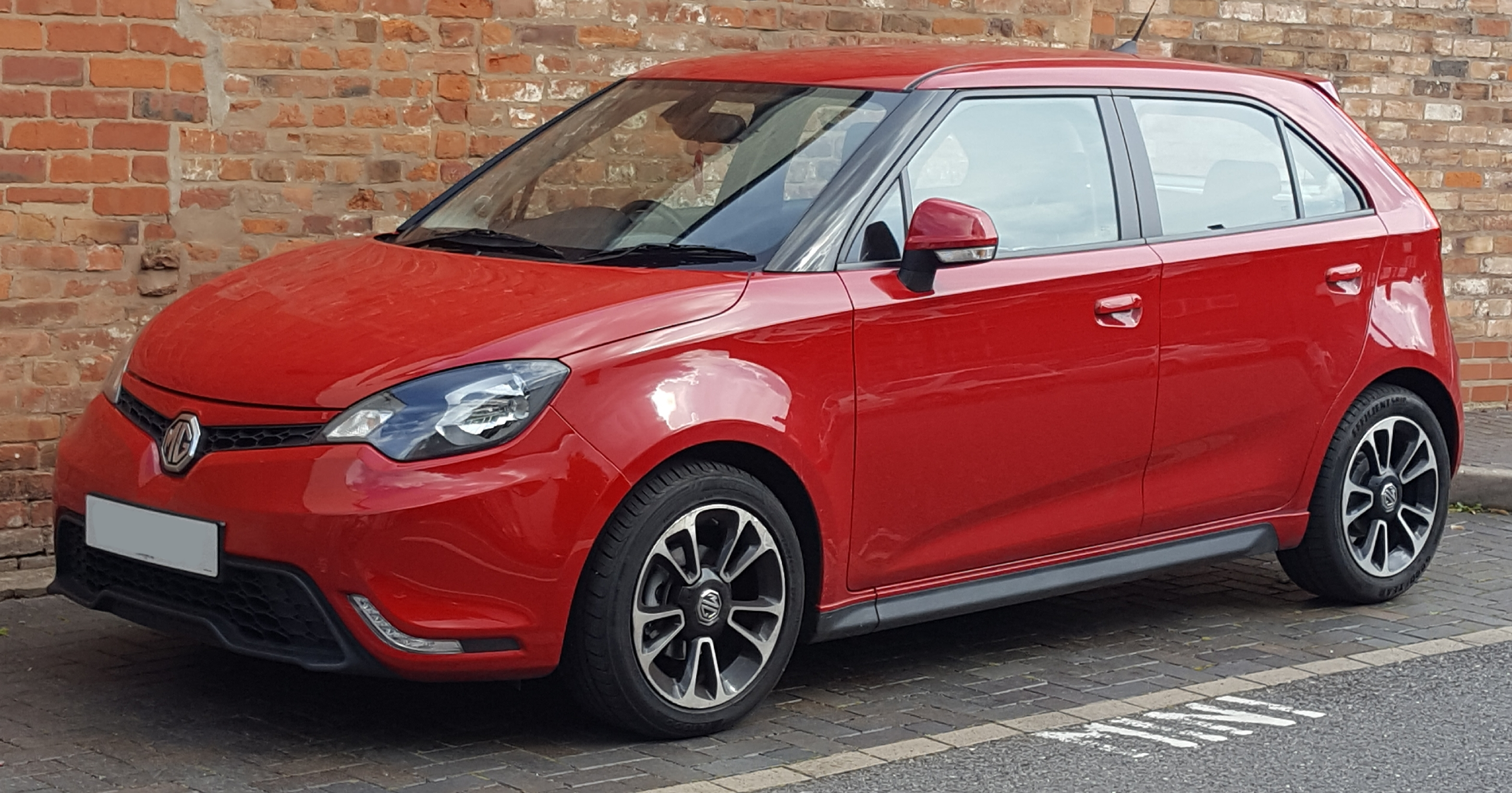

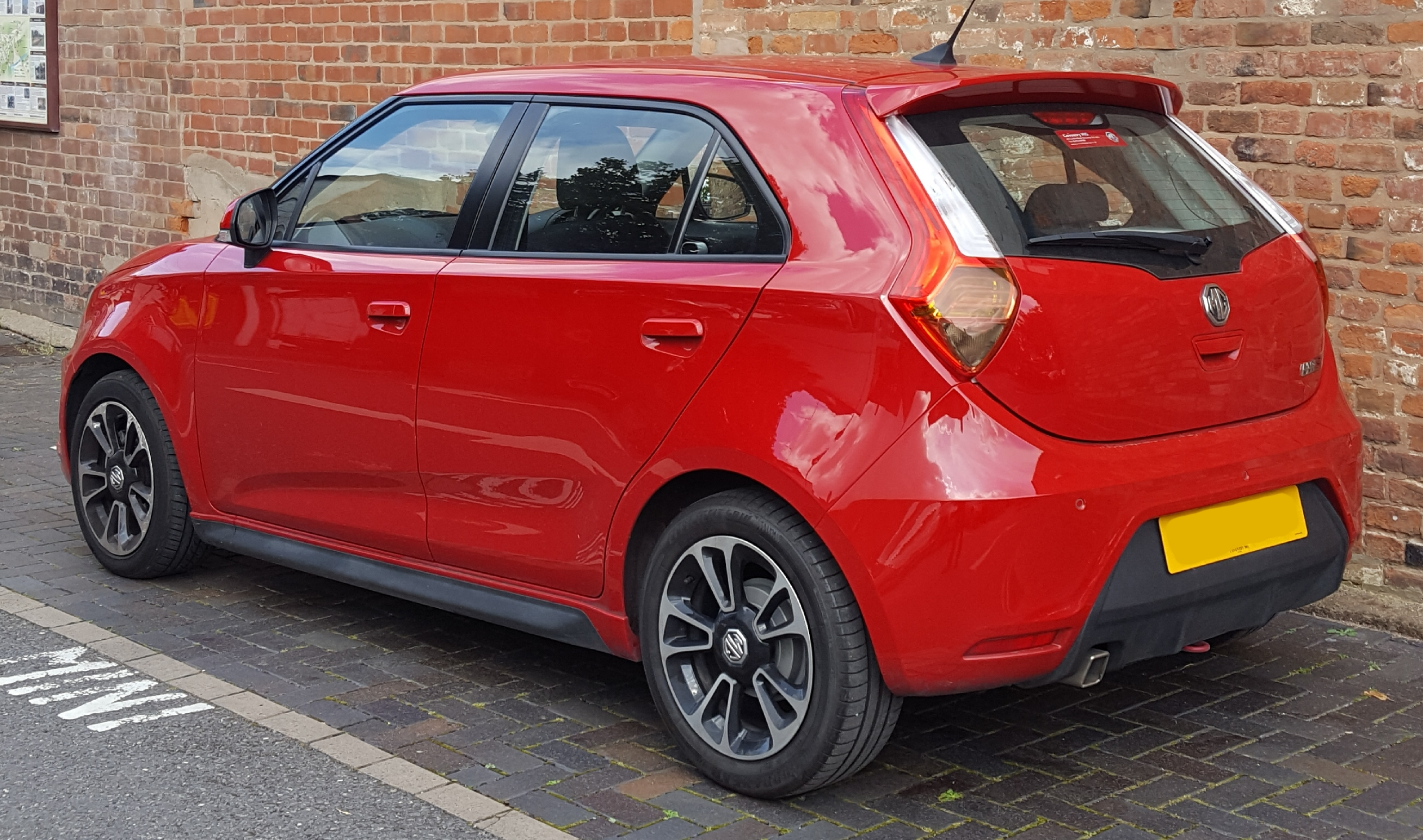
MG3 (facelift, United Kingdom)

A restyled version of the MG3, with a revised front design, was announced in the spring of 2013, with sales in the United Kingdom beginning in September 2013, but only with the 1.5 litre 105 hp (78 kW) engine option.

The MG3 was assembled in the Longbridge plant from 2013 until 2016.

For 2016, the MG3 received several alterations to improve it: the installation of an EU 6 derivative of the standard 1.5-litre engine, developed by SAIC Motor UK, a stop start was fitted, and two-tone colour schemes, primarily on the red and yellow MG3's which can have either a black or white roof, were offered as options.

==== Engines ====
The MG 3 is only available with a 1.5-litre engine, which has received an EU 6 upgrade to reduce emissions, and also the addition of stop start.

Petrol engines
Model	Engine	Displacement	Power	Torque	Top Speed	0–60 mph (0–97 km/h)	CO_{2} emissions
1.3 VTi Tech	I4	1,343 cc	93 PS (68 kW; 92 hp) at 6,000 rpm	118 N⋅m (87 lb⋅ft) at 5,000 rpm	111 mph (179 km/h)	__._s	___ g/km
1.5 VTi Tech	I4	1,498 cc	106 PS (78 kW; 105 hp) at 6,000 rpm	137 N⋅m (101 lb⋅ft) at 4,500 rpm	113 mph (182 km/h)	10.4s	136 g/km
1.5 VTi Tech EU 6	I4	1,498 cc	106 PS (78 kW; 105 hp) at 6,000 rpm	137 N⋅m (101 lb⋅ft) at 4,500 rpm	113 mph (182 km/h)	10.4s	124 g/km

==== MG3 Trophy ====
MG3 Trophy

MG unveiled the MG3 Trophy Championship concept car at the MG90 event at Silverstone in June 2014.

The MG3 Trophy Championship concept, based on the MG3 production vehicle platform and created to highlight in-house engineering, design and calibration capabilities by SMTC UK at Longbridge, continues the MG tradition of club racing.

The racing concept was created solely by a team of engineers, managed by Vehicle Engineering Specialist Adrian Guyll, and based at SAIC Motor's European Design and Technical Centre (SMTC), located alongside MG Motor UK at the Longbridge site in Birmingham.

Specifications:

- 204 hp (152 kW) (increased from 106 PS)
- Torque 250 Nm (increased from 136 Nm)
- Boost 1.0 Bar
- 1.5 Vti Tech engine
- Full body-lightening programme without compromising on stiffness
- Limited slip differential
- Fully adjustable Macpherson strut front set up
- Bespoke anti-roll bar
- Adjustable front splitter
- Twin plane adjustable rear spoiler

=== Second facelift (2018) ===
The MG3 was revised in 2018 with a facelift to the exterior and a new interior. The interior redesign now includes space for an eight-inch touchscreen unit, which is fitted as standard to some models. The 1.5-litre engine received minor modifications to bring it up to EU 6D standards, and now rated at 140g/km for CO_{2} emissions.

Chinese models are available with a slightly more powerful 1.5 litre engine option mated to a four speed automatic gearbox. In Thailand, the MG3 was launched on 21 June 2018. The models were only in 1.5L engine and four speed automatic. Transmission included 1.5 C, 1.5 D, 1.5 X Sunroof and 1.5 V Sunroof. In Brunei, the MG 3 was launched since the middle of 2019. The models were only in 1.5L engine and four speed automatic. Transmission included Core and Excite.

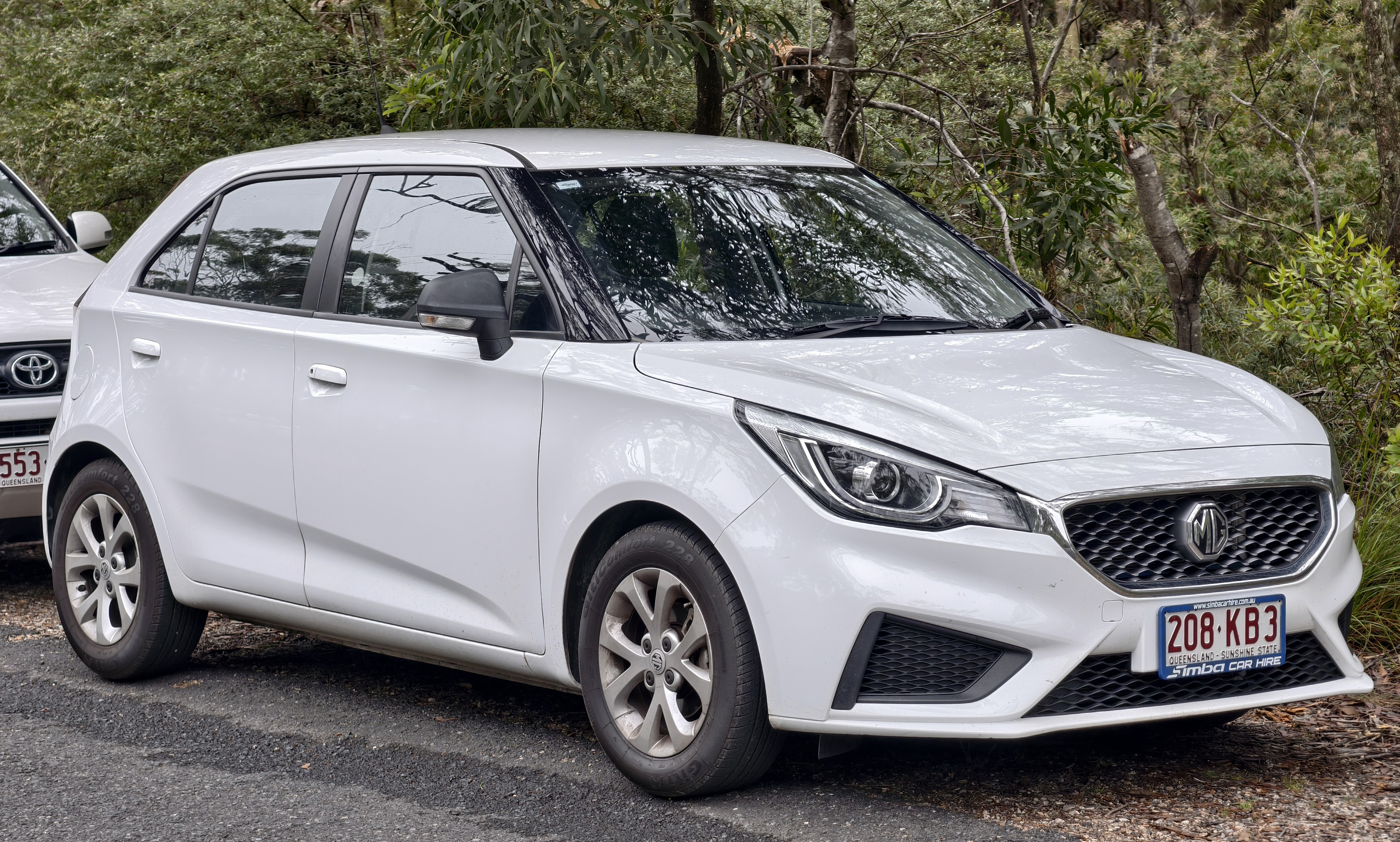
Second facelift (Australia; front view)

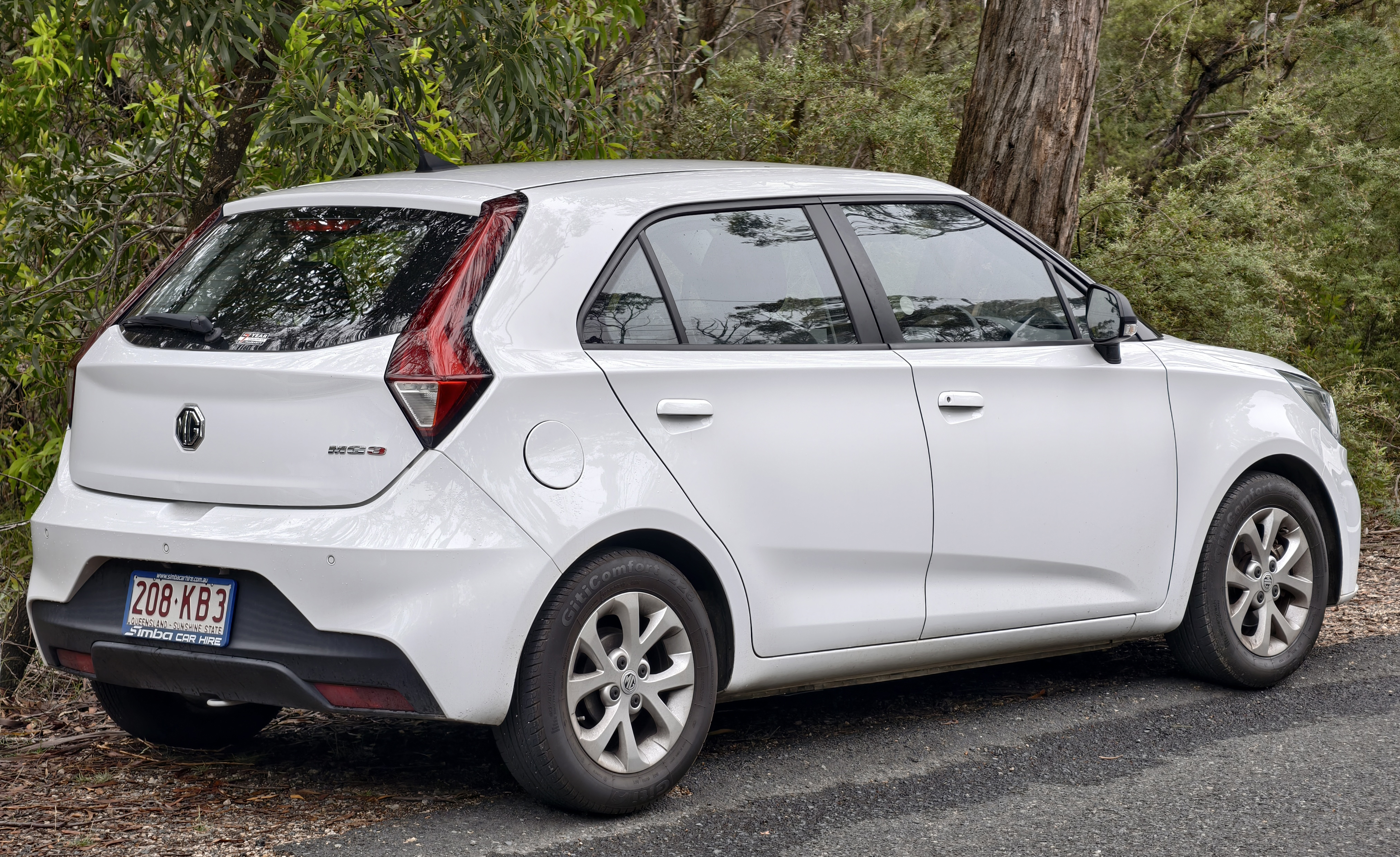
Second facelift (Australia; rear view)

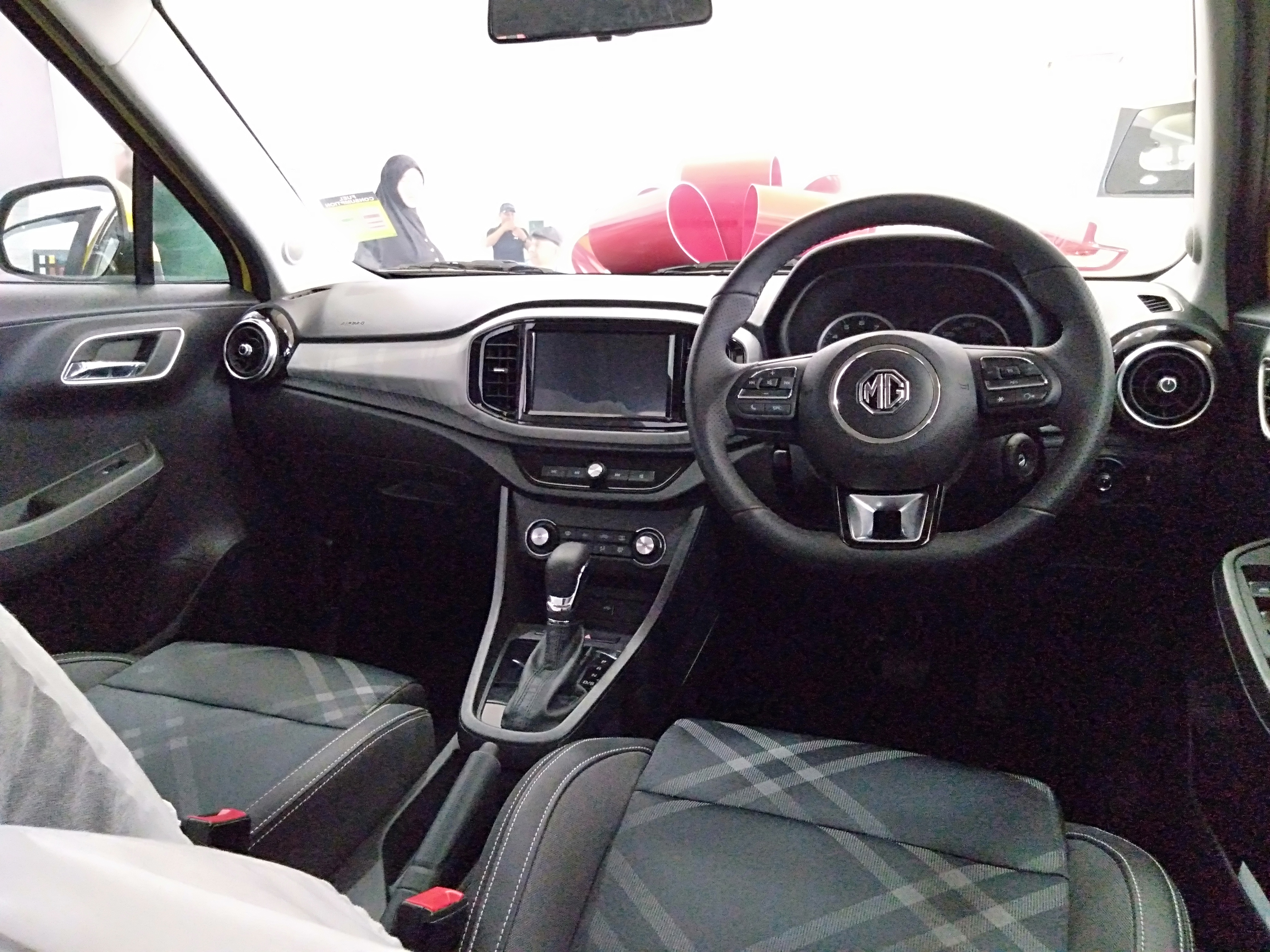
Interior, second facelift (Brunei)

Petrol engines
Model	Engine	Displacement	Power	Torque	Top Speed	0–60 mph (0–97 km/h)	CO_{2} emissions
1.5 VTi Tech EU 6D	I4	1,498 cc	106 PS (78 kW; 105 hp) at 6,000 rpm	137 N⋅m (101 lb⋅ft) at 4,500 rpm	113 mph (182 km/h)	10.4s	140 g/km
1.5 VTi Tech Auto (15S4C)	I4	1,498 cc	111 PS (82 kW; 109 hp) at 6,000 rpm	150 N⋅m (111 lb⋅ft) at 4,500 rpm			

=== Safety ===
The MG3 was crash tested by Euro NCAP in 2014, receiving a score of 3 out of 5 stars for safety, with a 69% score for adult protection (lower than the 90% result for the Mitsubishi Mirage), which was valid in accordance with Euro NCAP's testing standards until June 2020. According to analysis of the results of multiple crash tests by Euro NCAP, a number of issues were found including the driver's head bottoming out on the steering wheel through the airbag; "The passenger compartment remained stable in the frontal impact. The airbags of both the driver and the passenger were not sufficiently inflated to prevent the head 'bottoming out', through the fabric of the airbag, against the steering wheel and dashboard, respectively. [...] However, structures in the dashboard were considered a risk to occupants of different sizes or to those sat in different positions and protection of the knee/femur/pelvis area was rated as marginal". In a rear impact test, the crash test dummy measurements produced marginal results for front seat whiplash protection, and poor protection for rear seat occupants, the lowest score possible.

The facelifted MG3 did not involve a change to the basic architecture underpinning the vehicle, with the design carrying over the same overall shape, and thus the protection afforded by the chassis has not changed throughout the production of the second generation MG3. The rating of 3 out of 5 stars remained unchanged during Euro NCAP's annual review in July 2018, for the facelifted variant.

The MG3 has not been crash tested, nor rated by ANCAP. The facelifted variant lacks any active safety features such as autonomous emergency braking, instead including basic safety provisions such as six airbags (two prior to the facelift), passenger airbag cut off switch, emergency braking assistance, electronic stability control, active cornering brake control system, hill hold control, ABS with electronic brakes, automatic door unlocking in case of accidents, front disk brakes, tyre pressure monitoring, speed sensitive door locking, ultra-high tensile steel body, seat belt warning alarm and vehicle immobilizer.

An MG3 was tested by ASEAN NCAP in May 2018, producing a poor score of 2 stars out of a possible 5, with the car receiving a score of 0 in the frontal impact test due to poor protection of the driver's head, causing it to bottom out through the airbag as found in Euro NCAP's testing. Contrastingly, ASEAN NCAP found that the test vehicle protected the occupant's legs better, "The model was tested by Euro NCAP in 2014 however, the performance for both NCAPs are different. In ASEAN NCAP test, the MG3 performed better in the lower legs area. Nevertheless, the driver's head sustained serious injury compared to Euro NCAP's."

ASEAN NCAP test results MG 3 (2018)
Test	Points
Overall:	2 /5 stars
Adult occupant:	19.58
Child occupant:	16.03
Safety assist:	13.19

== Third generation (2024) ==
Third generation

Overview
- Model code: ZP22
- Production: 2024–present
- Assembly: China: Nanjing (NAC); Thailand: Laem Chabang (SAIC-CP)
- Designer: Oleg Son

Body and chassis
- Related: MG ZS (second generation)

Powertrain
- Engine: Petrol: 1.5 L GM/SAIC L3A I4; Petrol hybrid: 1.5 L L3A Hybrid+ I4
- Electric motor: Permanent magnet synchronous (Hybrid+)
- Power output: 80 kW (107 hp; 109 PS) (1.5 petrol); 75 kW (101 hp; 102 PS) (petrol engine only, Hybrid+); 100 kW (134 hp; 136 PS) (electric motor, Hybrid+); 143 kW (192 hp; 194 PS) (combined system output, Hybrid+)
- Transmission: 5-speed manual; CVT; 3-speed E-AT automatic (Hybrid+)
- Hybrid drivetrain: Power-split (Hybrid+)
- Battery: 1.83 kWh, 350 V NMC lithium-ion

Dimensions
- Wheelbase: 2,570 mm (101.2 in)
- Length: 4,113 mm (161.9 in)
- Width: 1,797 mm (70.7 in)
- Height: 1,502 mm (59.1 in)
- Curb weight: 1,285 kg (2,833 lb)

The third-generation MG 3 was officially revealed on 26 February 2024 at the 2024 Geneva Motor Show. For the first time, it is available with a Hybrid+ hybrid electric powertrain.

Rear view

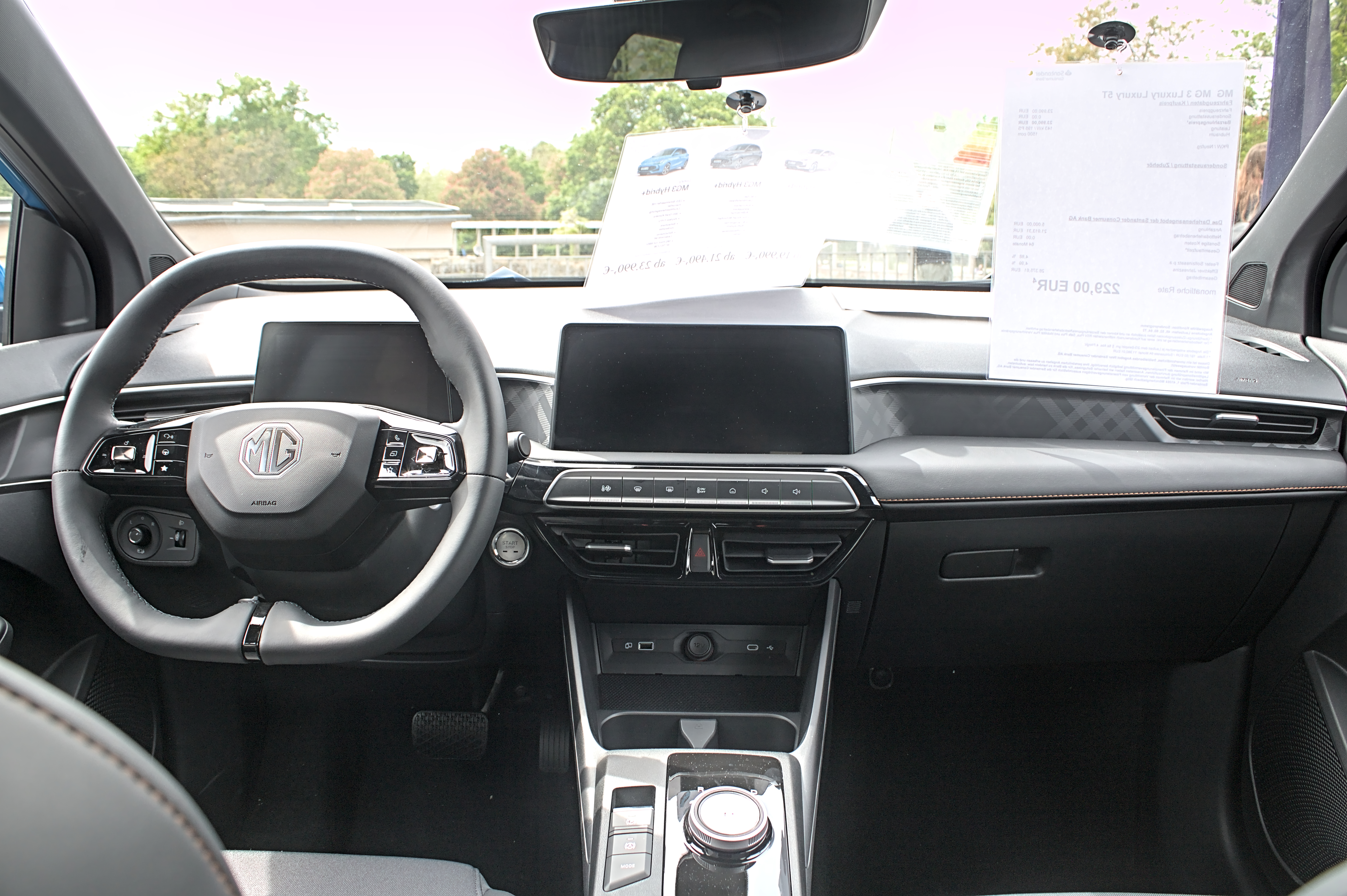
Interior

=== Markets ===
==== Argentina ====
The MG3 was launched in Argentina on 19 September 2025, as part of MG's entry to the Argentinian market by distributor Eximar. At launch, it was available with two trim levels: Comfort and Luxury, it is powered by the Hybrid+ powertrain. In June 2026, the ICE variant using the 1.5-litre petrol was introduced to the line-up as the entry-level variant.

==== Australia ====
The third-generation MG 3 was launched in Australia on 12 June 2024, with two trim levels: Excite and Essence; it is available with either a 1.5-litre petrol or a 1.5-litre Hybrid+ petrol hybrid. The entry-level Vibe trim powered by the 1.5-litre petrol was added in May 2025.

==== Brunei ====
The third-generation MG 3 was launched in Brunei on 19 January 2026, with two trim levels: Excite and Essence; it is only available with a 1.5-litre petrol engine.

==== Europe ====
The third-generation model of the MG 3 marks the first time it is available in other European markets instead of being solely limited to the UK, with European sales commenced in March 2024. For the European market, the MG 3 was initially only offered with the 1.5-litre Hybrid+ petrol hybrid. In February 2025, the 1.5-litre petrol engine without hybrid assistance was made available in the European market, as "MG’s commitment to delivering market-leading value."

==== Mexico ====
The third-generation MG 3 was launched in Mexico on 23 May 2024, with four trim levels: Cool, Style, Excite and Elegance. It is available with either a 1.5-litre petrol or a 1.5-litre Hybrid+ petrol hybrid.

==== Middle East ====
The third-generation MG 3 was launched in the Middle East on 26 February 2024, including the GCC market, Lebanon and Iraq. It is powered by the 1.5-litre petrol engine and it is offered in three trim levels; STD, COM and LUX.

==== Philippines ====
The third-generation MG 3 was launched in the Philippines on 4 June 2024, alongside the G50 Plus. For the Philippines market, the MG 3 is available with four trim levels: Standard, Comfort, Luxury and Hybrid; it is available with either a 1.5-litre petrol or a 1.5-litre Hybrid+ petrol hybrid.

==== South Africa ====
The third-generation MG 3 was launched in South Africa on 20 August 2025, with two trim levels: Comfort and Luxury; it is available with either a 1.5-litre petrol or a 1.5-litre Hybrid+ petrol hybrid.

==== Thailand ====
The third-generation MG 3 was launched in Thailand on 16 July 2024 with pricing released later on 20 August, with two trim levels: D and X; it is only available with the 1.5-litre Hybrid+ petrol hybrid.

=== Safety ===
Euro NCAP test results MG 3 Hybrid 1.5 HEV (LHD) (2025)
Test	Points	%
Overall:	4 /5 stars	
Adult occupant:	29.7	74%
Child occupant:	36.2	73%
Pedestrian:	51.3	81%
Safety assist:	12.4	69%

ANCAP test results MG 3 all variants (2024, aligned with Euro NCAP)
Test	Points	%
Overall:	3 /5 stars	
Adult occupant:	28.85	72%
Child occupant:	36.39	74%
Pedestrian:	48.03	78%
Safety assist:	10.62	58%

ANCAP test results MG 3 all variants (see Technical Report) (2024, aligned with Euro NCAP)
Test	Points	%
Overall:	4 /5 stars	
Adult occupant:	29.73	74%
Child occupant:	37.16	75%
Pedestrian:	51.30	81%
Safety assist:	12.64	70%

== Sales ==
Calendar year	Thailand	Australia	Mexico		
Calendar year	Thailand	Australia	MG3	Hybrid+	Total
2015	3,183		—	—	—
2016	5,427		—	—	—
2017	6,565		—	—	—
2018	5,908		—	—	—
2019		4,017	—	—	—
2020	4,856	7,158	—	—	—
2021	4,556	13,774	—	—	—
2022	337	16,168	—	—	—
2023		15,430	—	—	—
2024	1,138	12,563	11,243	927	12,170
2025		8,350	9,730	661	10,391
