= Rover Streetwise =

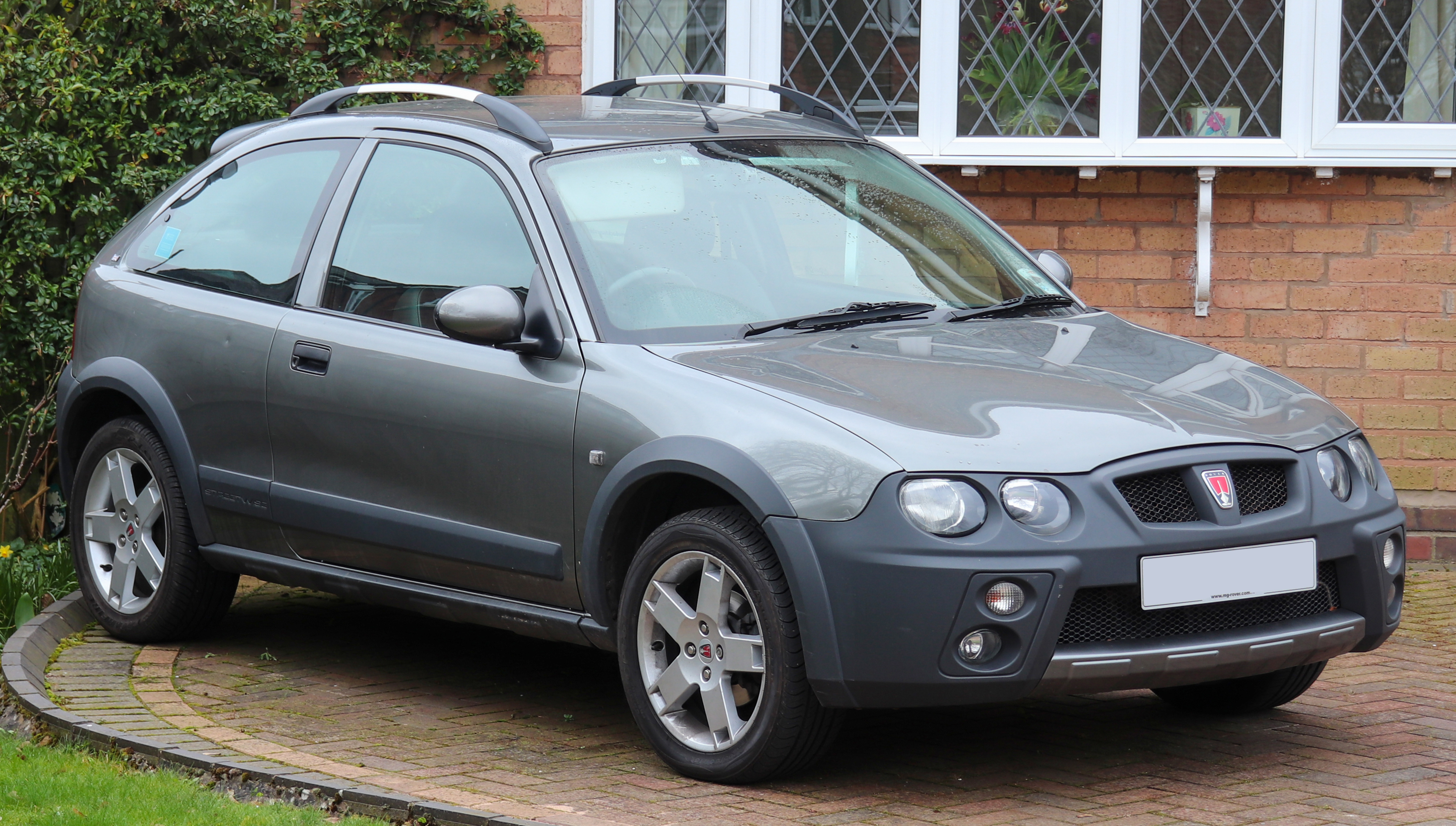

Overview
- Manufacturer: Rover (MG Rover)
- Production: 2003–2005
- Assembly: United Kingdom: Longbridge, England (Longbridge plant)
- Designer: Peter Stevens

Body and chassis
- Class: Compact car
- Body style: 3-door hatchback 5-door hatchback
- Related: Rover 25; MG 3 SW

Powertrain
- Engine: petrol: 1.4 L K-series I4; 1.6 L K-series I4; 1.8 L K-series I4; diesel: 2.0 L L-series turbo I4

Chronology
- Successor: MG 3 SW

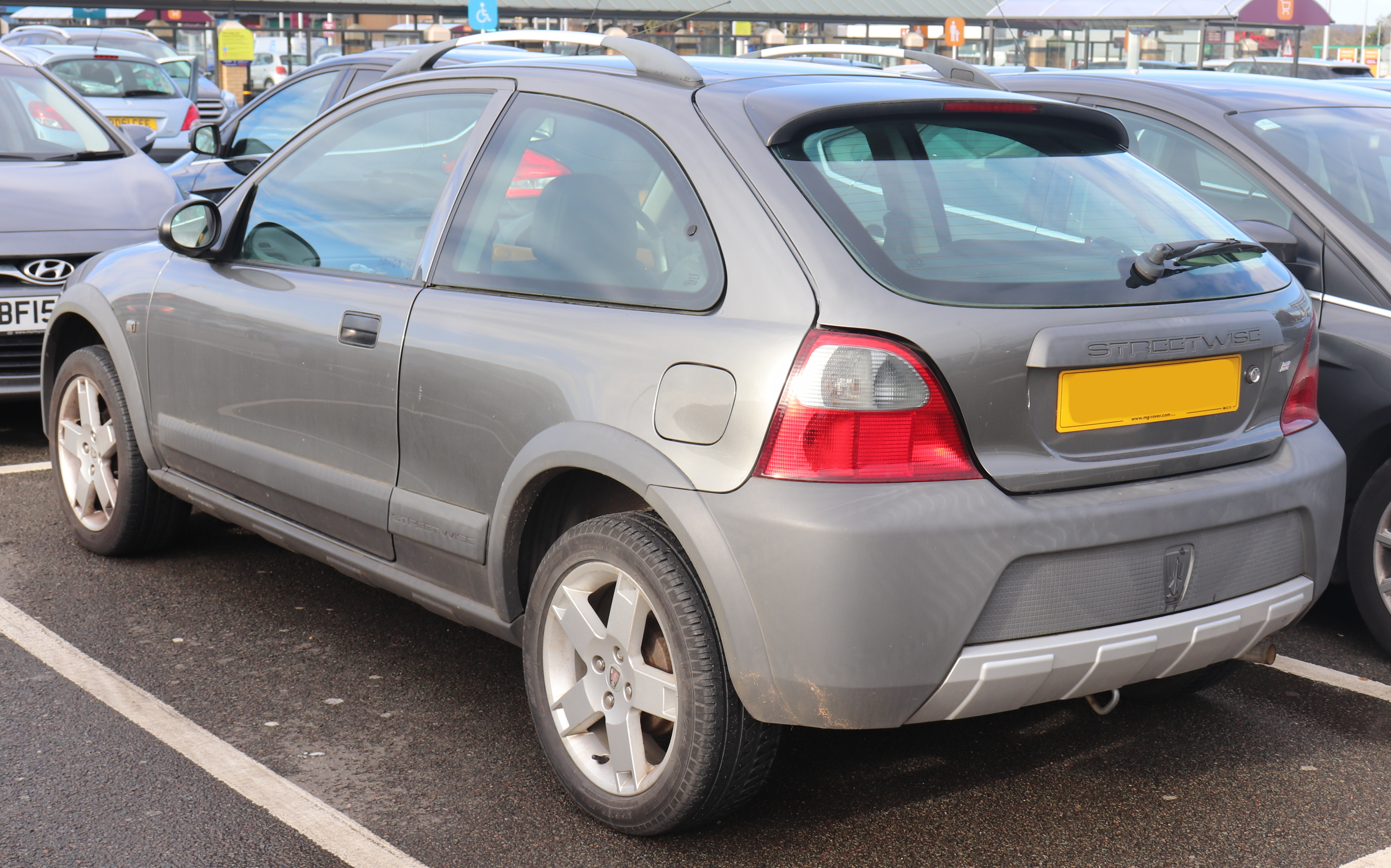
Rover Streetwise, rear view

The Rover Streetwise is a compact British car made by MG Rover. It was based on the Rover 25, but had an increased ride height and chunkier bumpers. The car was marketed by Rover as an 'urban on-roader'. Production ended in April 2005, due to the bankruptcy of MG Rover, but reappeared in March 2008 in China as the MG 3 SW, following the purchase of MG Rover's assets by Nanjing Automobile Group.

== History ==
The Rover Streetwise was an attempt by Rover to appeal to younger drivers. Rover had modernised the existing models in 1999 with a facelift for the 25, 45 and the Rover designed 75 models but Rover was suffering falling sales and a tarnished brand after the sale of Rover to the consortium of Phoenix in March 2000 by BMW.

Although new models were in the planning stages, the 25 and 45 models would be at least ten years old before the new models were launched. Phoenix owned the rights to the MG brand, and had marketed the ZR, ZS and ZT with some success, restyling the existing 25, 45 and 75 models. This included tweaked suspension, new wheels, altered dashboard inserts, different seats and bodykits.

With the MG brand proving popular, MG Rover Group turned their attention to the Rover brand. The cars badged as Rover had a rather staid image, and were commonly associated with elderly motorists. Thus, MG Rover attempted to appeal to a younger market.

MG Rover decided to design a car for a niche market, and chose the ‘urban on roader’ look, similar to the Audi A6 Allroad, Škoda Octavia Scout, Volvo XC70 and the Volkswagen Polo Fun/CrossPolo. The Streetwise ceased production in April 2005, when Rover ceased trading and went into administration.

== Design ==
The tough-looking Streetwise was designed as a two-wheel drive urban car with 4x4 looks. The Streetwise had a 10mm higher ride height than the basic 25, and although it shared many of the common characteristics of the 25, it was visually different with large impact absorbing grey or black plastic bumpers.

Unlike the rest of the Rover and MG range, the Streetwise bumpers were not colour coded. The front indicators were redesigned to complement the circular headlamps, and most models came with chunky sixteen inch wheels as standard. To extend the load space, the Streetwise was fitted with multi purpose roof bars, which also served to distinguish the Streetwise from the ZR and the 25, in addition to the standard 60/40 split rear seats.

The Streetwise offered a choice of sporty interiors, available in four or five seats (optional). The standard four seats had two separate rear seats and a separating centre console, and body hugging front sports seats on all models, trimmed in half leather on SE and later GSi models. All models came with a driver's airbag, PAS, remote central locking with perimetric alarm and ABS.

The S added electric front windows, body-coloured door mirrors, 16" alloy wheels with security wheel nuts, a CD tuner with rear speakers and steering wheel remote audio controls. Top spec SE models further added air conditioning, electric door mirrors, a leather steering wheel and gear stick, part leather seats with rear headrests, choice of seat facing colourway, front fog lamps, and body coloured bumper inserts.

Other subtle changes included a revised centre console and a restyled blue instrument dials. All Streetwises came with Trafficmaster Alert, an early warning device to warn the drivers of congested routes. The Streetwise also came with rear parking sensors, as an option or as standard on higher models.

== Engines ==
The Streetwise engines were available as 1.4, 1.6, 1.8 stepspeed (Automatic), and a 2.0 TD. The 1.6 and the 1.8 were less common.

Years	Model & Transmission	Engine	Power	Torque	Top Speed	0–100 km/h	Economy (MPG imp)	Emissions (CO_{2})
Petrol							Economy (MPG imp)	Emissions (CO_{2})
2003–2005	1.4 16v 84 Manual	1.4 L, 4 in L	84 PS (62 kW; 83 hp)	110 N·m (81 lb·ft)	169 km/h (105 mph)	11.8 secs	41.3 mpg	164 g/km
2003–2005	1.4 16v 103 Manual	1.4 L, 4 in L	103 PS (76 kW; 102 hp)	123 N·m (91 lb·ft)	180 km/h (112 mph)	10.2 secs	41.3 mpg	164 g/km
2003–2005	1.6 16v Manual	1.6 L, 4 in L	111 PS (82 kW; 109 hp)	145 N·m (107 lb·ft)	190 km/h (118 mph)	9.3 secs	37.0 mpg	179 g/km
2003–2005	1.8 16v Stepspeed	1.8 L, 4 in L	117 PS (86 kW; 115 hp)	160 N·m (118 lb·ft)	185 km/h (115 mph)	9.5 secs	34.7 mpg	194 g/km
Diesel
2003–2005	2.0 TD 101 Manual	2.0 L, 4 in L	101 PS (74 kW; 100 hp)	240 N·m (177 lb·ft)	182 km/h (113 mph)	9.9 secs	53.8 mpg	150 g/km

== MG3 SW ==
In February 2008, the Streetwise, rebadged as the MG3 SW, was relaunched in China by Nanjing Automobile Group.
