= Rover 200 Coupé =

Rover 200 Coupé Rover Coupé
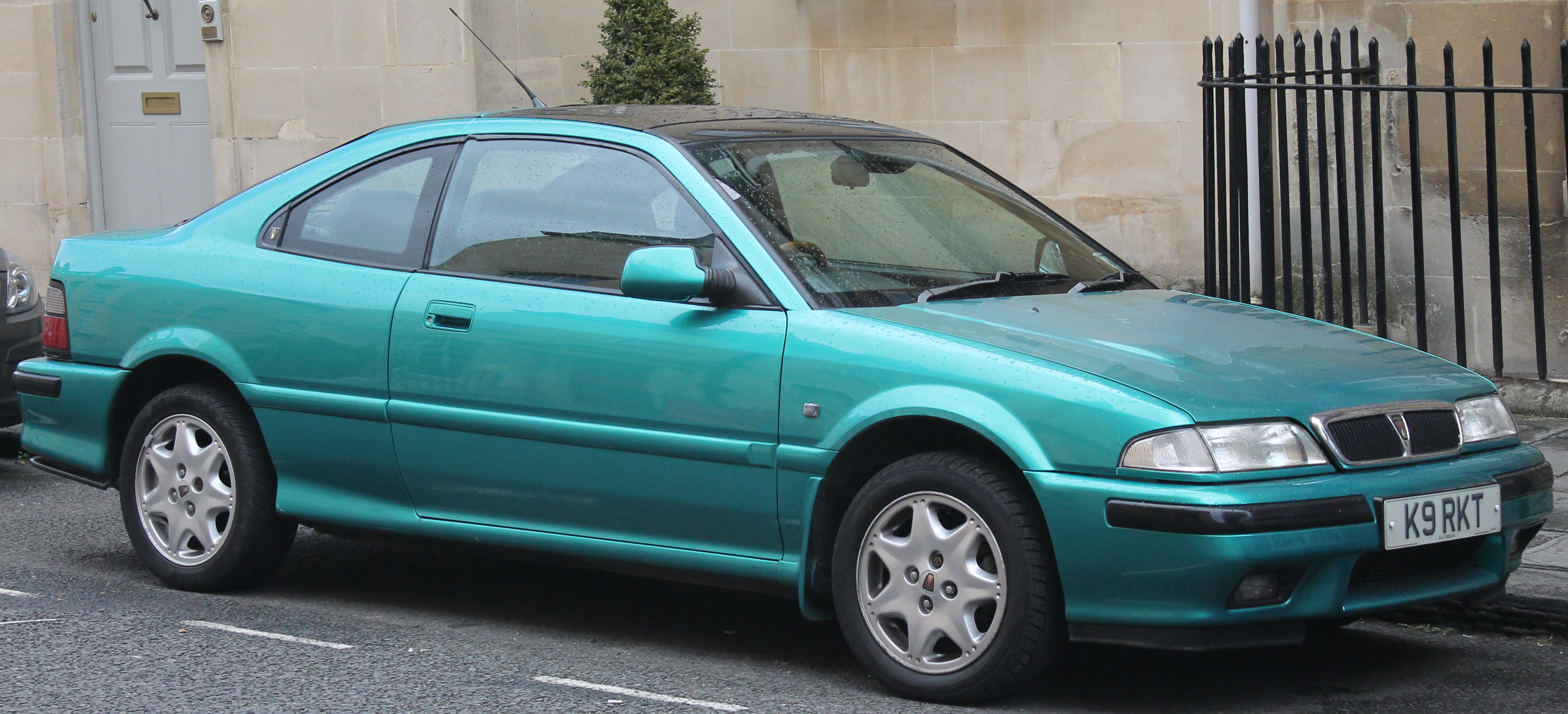

Overview
- Manufacturer: Rover
- Production: 1992–1998
- Assembly: United Kingdom: Longbridge, Birmingham (Longbridge plant)

Body and chassis
- Class: Sports car (S)
- Body style: 2-door coupé
- Layout: FF layout
- Related: Honda Concerto; Rover 200

Powertrain
- Engine: petrol: 1.6 L K-series I4; 1.6 L Honda D16A6 I4; 1.6 L Honda D16A8 DOHC I4; 1.8 L K-series VVC I4; 2.0 L T-series I4; 2.0 L T-series turbo I4

Dimensions
- Wheelbase: 2,550 mm (100.4 in)
- Length: 4,270 mm (168.1 in)
- Width: 1,680 mm (66.1 in)
- Height: 1,370 mm (53.9 in)

The Rover 200 Coupé is a two-door coupé that was produced by Rover and based on the Rover 200 Mark II, with most of the body panels and the bumpers unique in the range. The car was launched on 6 October 1992, at the Paris Motor Show. It was given the project code name 'Tomcat' when in development.

When introduced, the range flagship, the 220 Turbo Coupé, was the most powerful and fastest production Rover model ever built.

The range was revised in 1996, with new engines, and was renamed Rover Coupé. Production ceased in 1998.

== Styling ==
The Rover 200 Coupé was equipped with a specially shaped split glass roof system with a central T-Bar. The twin panels could be tilted or detached independently, and the bar itself could also be removed and stored in the boot in a special protective cover. The glass was an advanced, semi reflective material, coated with titanium. Transmission of solar heat was restricted to only six per cent, eliminating the need for a sun blind.

The lines of the 200 Coupé resulted from a completely new monoside and front and rear roof panels, new front and rear bumpers and a deep front spoiler extension with large intake grille.

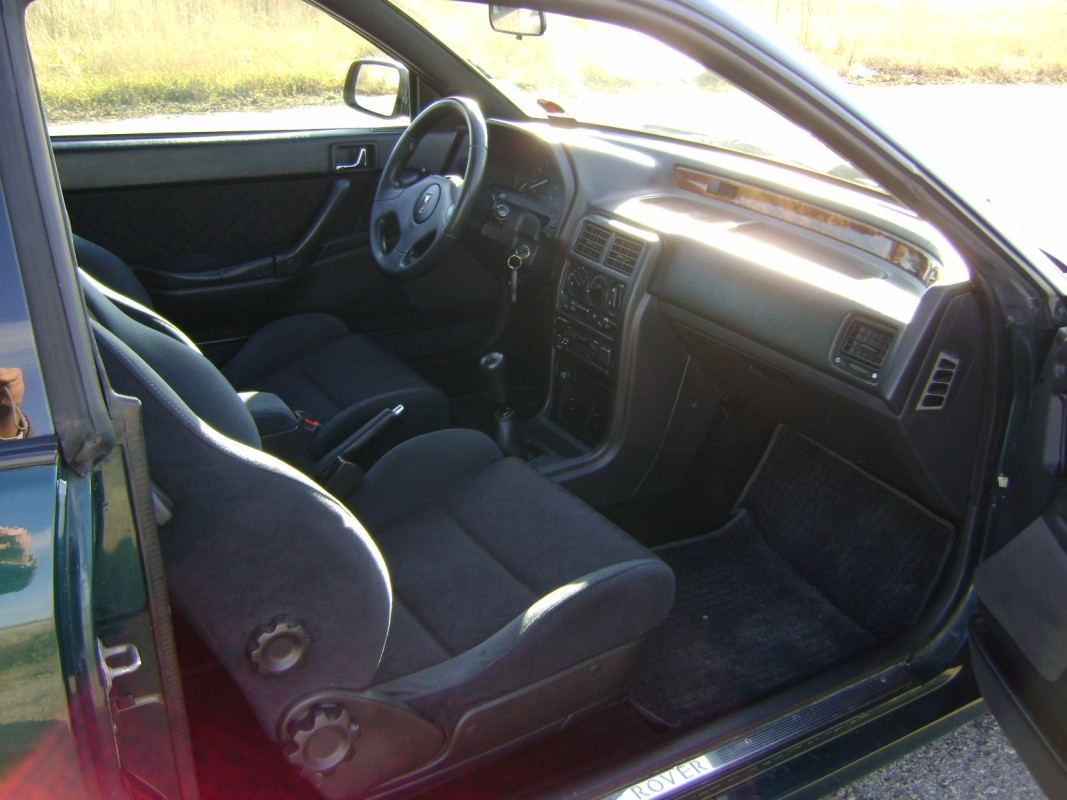
Early style interior

The interior was designed to accommodate four people, with rear seats individually styled. With the application of burr walnut veneer and quality fabrics, the interior was in the Rover traditions of elegance and refinement. Optional leather trim was also available. The Rover 200 Coupé featured infra red remote central door locking as standard. It also saw the application of ultrasonic alarm system developed originally for the Rover 800 range, giving both perimetric and volumetric protection.

== Rover 200 Coupé (1992–1995) ==
A specially developed version of the established 'Torsen' torque sensing traction control system previously only applied to four wheel drive and some rear wheel drive vehicles (Maserati Biturbo), was developed to help optimise handling. It was standard on the 220 Turbo Coupé, and optional for the first year of production on the naturally aspirated 220 version. Critics at the time reported that the handling was marred by the power being rather clumsily transmitted through the front wheels. As a result, the handling dynamics fell short of its rivals.

At launch, three engine types gave the Coupé a broad appeal: a Honda D-Series 1.6-litre engine 111 PS (82 kW; 109 bhp), and two Rover 2.0 T-Series engines; a naturally aspirated version producing 136 PS (100 kW; 134 bhp) and a turbo version 200 PS (147 kW; 197 bhp). All versions had manual transmission as standard, with an automatic option only with the 1.6 version.

In 1994, changes were introduced to the 200 Coupé range, most obviously with a chrome grille being added to bring in line with the rest of the 200 series. Cost saving changes were also seen, such as a reduction in the amount of leather used, ignition barrel light removed and dash light dimming deleted. The alarm system received several changes to keep up with current security requirements.

Ash Grey was the standard trim colour on all derivatives, but the optional full leather trim set could be specified in either Ash Grey or Sand Stone Beige. Exterior colours initially were: White Diamond, Flame Red, Black, Quicksilver Metallic, Nordic Blue Metallic, Polynesian Turquoise Metallic, Nightfire Red Pearlescent and Tahiti Blue Pearlescent (a new colour exclusive to the Coupé, later introduced to other cars in the Rover range). In 1994, Nordic Blue and Quicksilver were replaced with British Racing Green, Platinum Silver and Charcoal. Black, pearlescent or metallic paint were optional on all models.

=== 216 Coupé ===
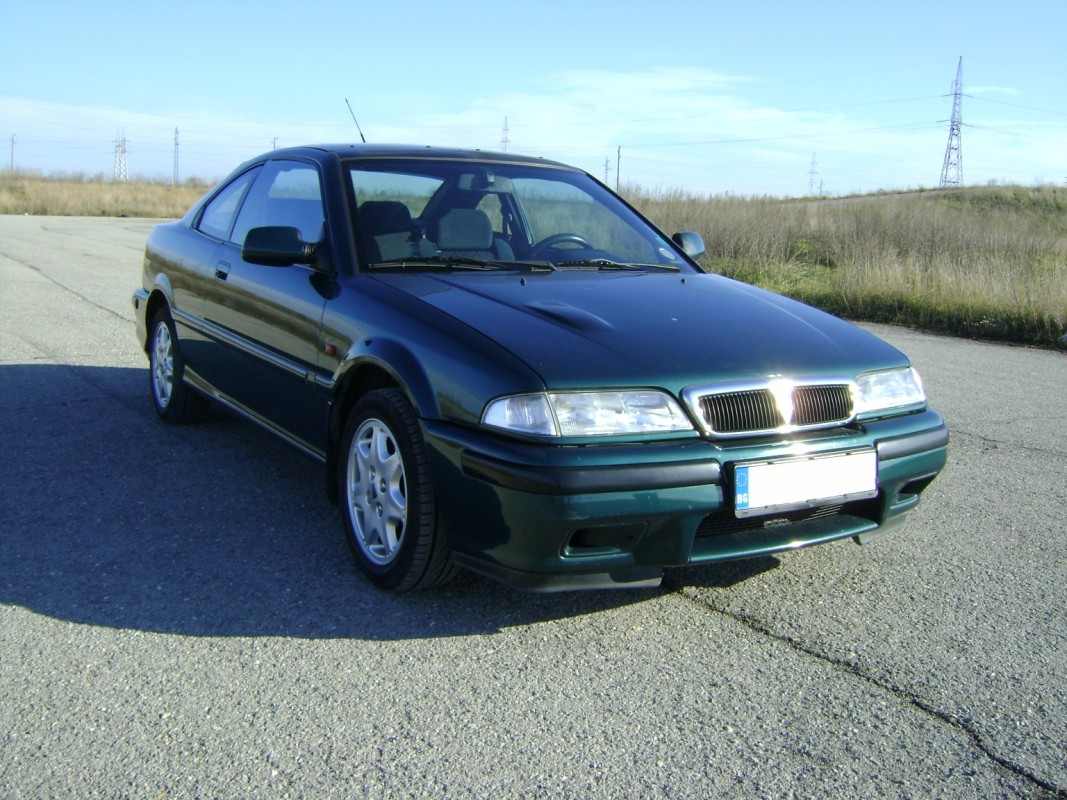
1994 216 Coupe in British Racing Green

The 1.6-litre model was designed to appeal to the cost conscious Coupé buyer. Priced at £14,495, the 111 PS (82 kW; 109 bhp) version achieved a 0 to 60 mph time of 9.5 seconds and a maximum speed of 120 mph (193 km/h). Excessive stock of the 216 Coupé led Rover to bring out a new model, the 216 SE, prior to the new 1996 range was launched. This was dressed up with the rear body coloured spoiler and front fog lamps, aimed to generate additional sales to clear the way for the new models.

- Positive centre feel power steering
- Ventilated front disc brakes
- 15" 7 spoke alloy road wheels with 185/55 VR tyres
- Locking wheel nuts
- Infra-red remote central door locking
- Comprehensive alarm system with engine immobilisation
- Two-piece glass sunroof with T Bar
- Sports style seats with lumbar adjustment for both front seats
- Electronic 3-band stereo radio/cassette with four speakers
- Roof mounted radio aerial
- Electric front windows
- 50/50 split folding rear seat backrest
- Height adjustable steering wheel
- Tinted glass

Options included:

- 4 speed automatic transmission with torque lock-up
- Anti-lock braking system (including rear disc braking)
- ICE upgrade including 6 disc CD changer and RDS
- Full leather trim set
- Driver seat height adjustment
- Air conditioning

=== 220 Coupé ===
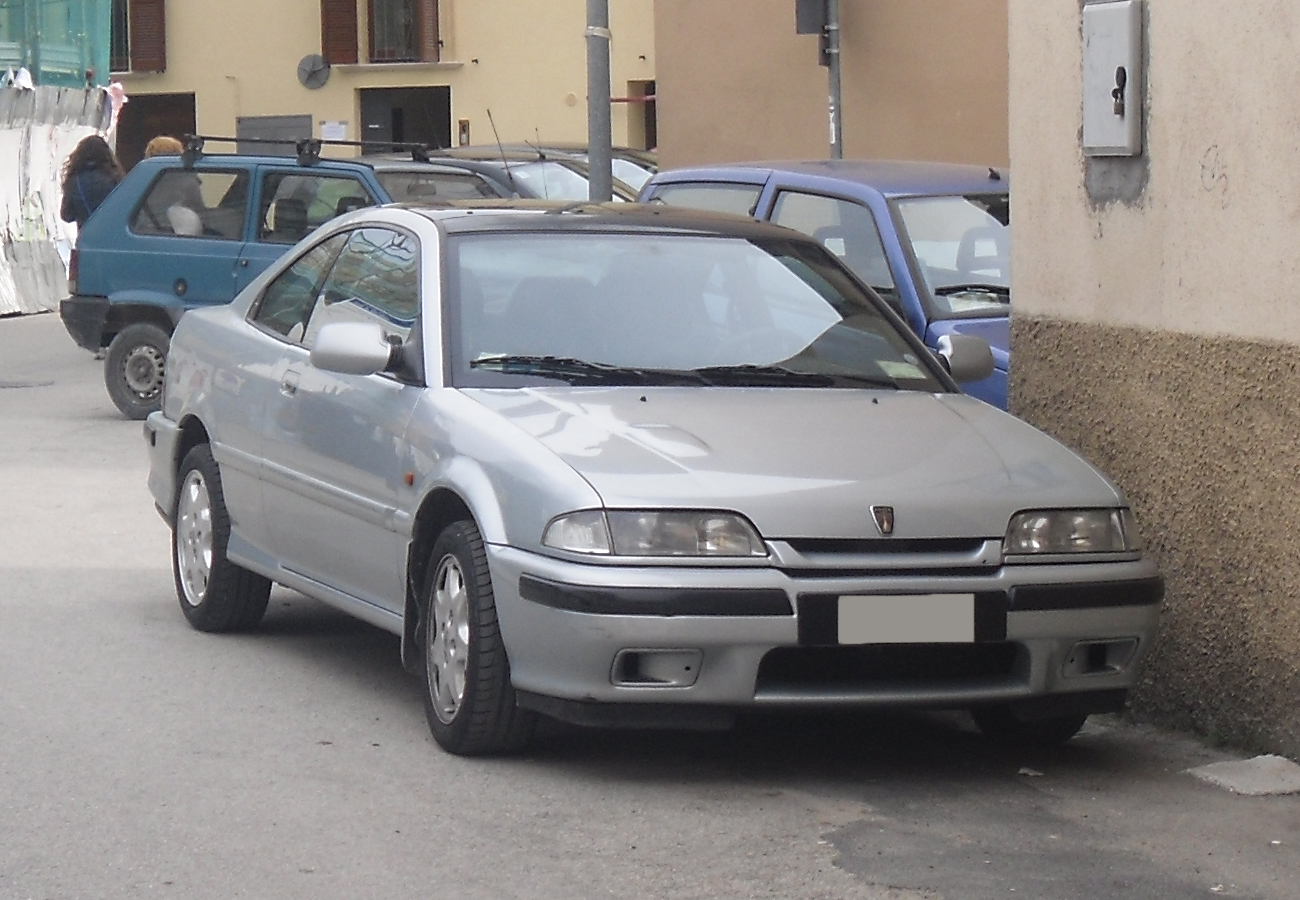
Rover 200 Coupe with original front design

This model featured the T series 2.0 litre 16 valve engine, later introduced into the rest of the 200/400 range in 1993. It replaced the M16 unit used in previous models. The 220 Coupé was priced at £16,670. In naturally aspirated form, the 16 valve T-Series produced 136 PS (100 kW; 134 bhp) at 6000 rpm and a top speed of 127 mph (204 km/h). 0-60 mph was achieved in 8.2 seconds.

Over the 216 Coupé, the 220 featured:

- Rear disc brakes
- Anti lock braking system
- Front fog lamps
- R750 RDS ICE
- Leather seat borders
- Boot mounted body coloured spoiler

Options included:

- 'TorSen' differential gearbox (deleted from option after first year of production)
- ICE upgrade including 6 disc CD changer
- Full leather trim set
- Driver seat height adjustment
- Air conditioning

=== 220 Coupé Turbo ===
The flagship of the range, the 220 Coupé Turbo's performance came from the T-Series 2.0 litre 16 valve engine with turbocharging producing 200 PS (147 kW; 197 bhp) at 6000 rpm and 174 lb⋅ft (236 N⋅m) The fastest ever production Rover achieved 150 mph (241 km/h) and a 0 to 60 mph time of 6.2 seconds and 30 to 70 mph in 5.7 seconds in a test by Autocar in October 1992.

Torsen torque sensing traction control, uprated suspension and anti lock brakes as standard. The differential is a completely mechanical device so by most manufacturer's standards this would not have been considered to be a 'Traction Control System'. However, the LSD was the reason why the Rover was marketed as having traction control. Anti lock braking (ABS) was standard on the 2.0 litre models. The car was priced at £18,315. Features of the Rover 220 Coupé Turbo over the naturally aspirated 220 included:

- Michelin Pilot tyres 195/55 on 15" six spoke 'Turbo' alloy road wheels
- Leather trimmed steering wheel and gear knob
- Turbo designation on rear appliqué panel

Options included:

- ICE upgrade including six disc CD changer
- Full leather trim set
- Driver seat height adjustment
- CFC free air conditioning

== Rover Coupé (1996–1998) ==
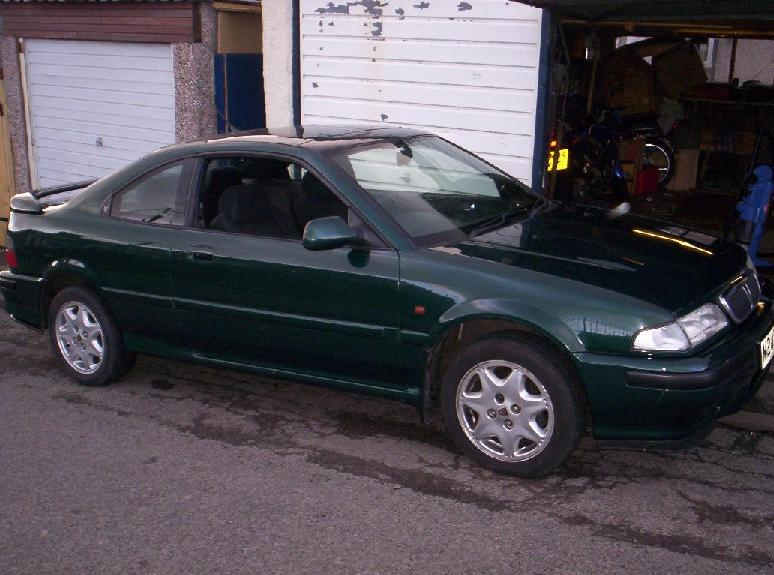
Rover 220 Coupe

In 1996, Rover announced revisions to the Coupé, with the range also losing the 200 model name. Two, all new, models were introduced to replace the previous models. The Coupé 1.6 was now fitted with Rover Group's own K-Series 16 valve double overhead camshaft power unit instead of the previous Honda unit. The 2.0 and Turbo models were replaced by the 1.8 VVC Coupe.

Inside, the interior was completely revamped and featured the new rounder dash as fitted to the newer shape Rover 200. The alarm system on all models was again changed and now featured Thatcham approval. The interior trim was lightened from the dark Ash Grey to a lighter Picadilly Grey. The 1.6 was fitted with cloth trim in either red or grey centres whilst the VVC came with the leather side bolsters as seen in previous models. All three models had the option of full smokestone leather.

Exterior paint could be specified in seven colours, including one all new colour: Flame Red, Charcoal, Platinum, British Racing Green, Tahiti Blue, Nightfire Red and Amaranth. Near the end of production, Diamond White again became available and another new colour, Anthracite was also available, although this is exceptionally rare.

In 1998, Rover Group ceased production of the Coupé, bringing the R8 range to an end. The Rover Coupé body shape was never revamped, to bring into line with the new shape 200 and 400.

=== Coupe 1.6 ===
The SE model ensured it continued into the new range and again featured a body coloured rear spoiler and front fog lamps over the standard 216 Coupé. The K-Series 1.6-litre engine produced the same 111 PS (82 kW; 109 bhp) as the previous Honda engine and could reach the same speed. The automatic transmission was again available for the 216 and 216 SE Coupé models only. The 1.6 was fitted with steel wheels with plastic trims or could be specified with a cost option six spoke 'turbo' alloy wheels. The SE came with an all new five spoke alloy wheels.

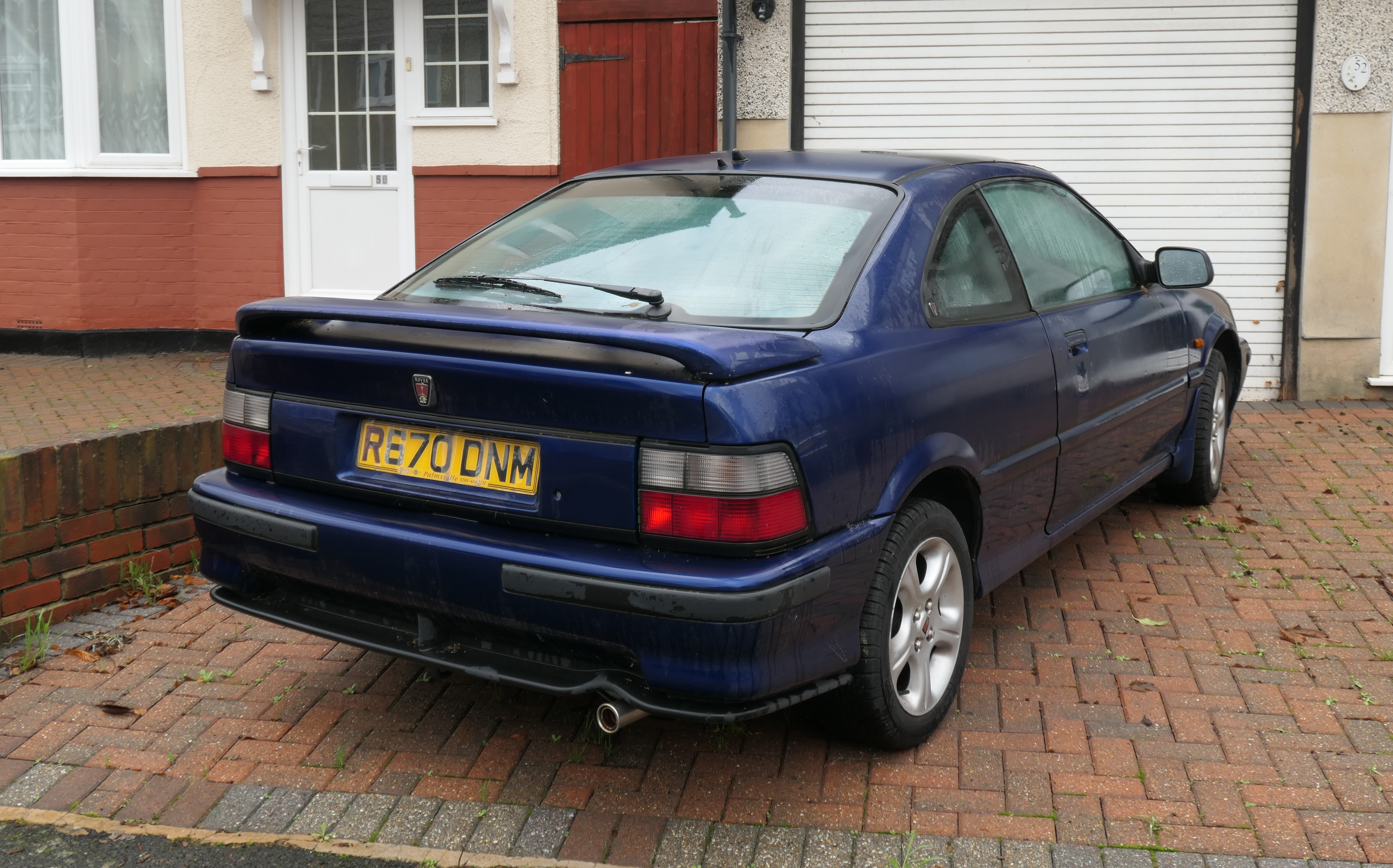
1998 Rover 218 Coupe VVC

=== Coupé 1.8 VVC ===
Launched to replace the 220 and Turbo, the VVC Coupé used Rover Group's K-Series engine with the addition of variable valve control as used in MG F. The VVC produced 145 PS (107 kW; 143 bhp), reached 131 mph (211 km/h) and a 0-60 mph time of 7.8 seconds, significantly slower than the previous Turbo model.

== Export versions ==
The 200 Coupé was sold throughout Europe, Japan and in New Zealand. The 216 Coupé sold outside the United Kingdom home market came fitted with double over head camshaft Honda power unit, rather than the single over head camshaft unit fitted to the cars for the United Kingdom. A batch of approximately 330 220 Coupé Turbo models were exported to Japan in 1995.

== Rover 200 Coupé Racing Series ==
In 1993, Rover Group produced 36 specifically modified 200 Coupé Turbo models. The cars were not undersealed and were seam welded and fully race prepared. Some cars came fitted with a 1.6 Honda D Series DOHC Engine from the Rover 216 GTI. The code name Tomcat from the project days was used to create a new race series, the Dunlop Rover Tomcat Race Series. The cars competed against each other around the United Kingdom & Europe for two years until Rover dropped their backing.

The series was renamed the Stafford Land Rover Super Coupé Cup and the cars continued to battle it out against each other. Many of the cars are still in existence and some still compete competitively against similar cars that have fallen fate of the end of single make series racing.
