= Phoenix Venture Holdings =

English company

Phoenix Venture Holdings Ltd
- Company type: Holding Company
- Industry: Automobiles
- Founded: 2000; 26 years ago
- Fate: Dissolved in 2006
- Headquarters: Longbridge, Birmingham, England, United Kingdom
- Key people: John Towers; Peter Beale; Nick Stephenson and John Edwards
- Subsidiaries: MG Rover; Powertrain Ltd

Phoenix Venture Holdings (PVH), also known as the Phoenix Consortium, was a British company formed by four businessmen (John Towers, Peter Beale, Nick Stephenson and John Edwards). Following BMW's break-up of the Rover Group a financially complex deal involving a £500 million "dowry payment" from BMW, resulted in PVH purchasing the Rover marque in May 2000 for the notional sum of £10, relaunching the car company as MG Rover. MG Rover and related companies placed themselves in administration on 8 April 2005.

== History ==
=== Establishment ===
BMW had acquired the Rover Group in 1994, but by 1999 it had become a major financial liability due to disappointing sales of some of its model ranges. In January 2000, it was reported that UK sales had fallen from more than 190,000 in 1998 to 143,000 in 1999 - a fall of more than 25% in sales for the company, despite overall new car sales increasing by 7%. Even Rover's newest model, the Rover 75 (launched in the spring of 1999), had failed to meet sales expectations.

Since September 1999 the venture capital company Alchemy Partners, run by Jon Moulton and Eric Walters, had been in talks with BMW about acquiring Rover. When news of the talks became public on 16 March 2000, Alchemy was widely expected to take control of at least some of the Rover Group, which BMW was prepared to sell. By that time, it was already decided that BMW would retain Mini (with the launch of an all-new Mini only a year away) and sell Land Rover to Ford. These were widely seen as the two most viable parts of the Rover Group.

Alchemy intended to name the company the MG Car Company, producing the MG F roadster and possibly developing additional, limited production sports cars. The Rover brand would have been dropped and all volume production of family cars abandoned, despite these cars making up the bulk of Rover sales - with more than 100,000 being sold in Britain alone during 1999. A large percentage of the workforce at Longbridge would also have been made redundant.

Jon Moulton withdrew the Alchemy bid when the Government added extra conditions to the sale, and a march through Birmingham led by Prof Carl Chinn opposed the Alchemy bid.

=== MG Rover ===
On 6 April 2000, John Towers — the most prominent of the four men known as the Phoenix consortium — presented a counter-offer to BMW. The Transport and General Workers Union (T&G), the UK Department of Trade and Industry (DTI), and the British public in general all threw their support behind Towers and the Phoenix Consortium, as Phoenix were the only potential bidders proposing to retain high-volume car production and full employment at the Rover plant in Longbridge, Birmingham. On 8 May, following a last-minute injection of finance from the First Union Bank of North Carolina, a deal with Phoenix was agreed. The sale was completed the next day. Due to UK regulations that hold the prior owner of a company responsible for all redundancy payments if the said company declares bankruptcy within 3 years of sale, BMW guaranteed that Phoenix Venture Holdings (initially named MG Rover Holdings) would have enough money to keep Rover Group in business for at least 3 years following the sale. The agreed "dowry" from BMW was made up of a £427million interest-free loan and stocks of cars. Kevin Howe was appointed MG Rover's managing director in July 2000.

Phoenix's short-term plan was to expand the MG range with sporting versions of existing Rovers, introduce new versions of the Rover 25, 45 and 75 models, reengineer and redesign the MG F, and eventually replace the entire model range with new cars developed through joint venture with another carmaker. The MG-badged versions of the Rover models were launched in the summer of 2001, and were reasonably popular. A 1.1 litre engine had already been added to the Rover 25 range, to give it a competitor at every level with most rival superminis. The MG F was updated shortly afterwards to become the MG TF, and a number of concept cars were shown to the public, hinting at all-new models which MG Rover was hoping to launch in the near future.

The consortium continued to enjoy strong UK press support for several years following the Phoenix coup, despite no all-new models being launched by the company. By 2003, MG Rover was the ninth best selling carmaker in Britain, whereas the Rover Group (which had still included Land Rover and Mini) had been the third biggest seller just five years earlier. It still had a 3.72% share of the new car market, accounting for more than 95,000 sales.

By the beginning of 2005, however, sales figures of MG Rover cars were declining sharply, not helped by the fact that most rival companies had launched all-new competitors in the previous five years. During 2004, the media had regularly reported that the company's sales were in decline. The Rover 25 and 45, for instance, were updated versions of designs which had first been launched in 1995, and all of their major rivals had been replaced once - and in some cases twice - since then.

=== Collapse of MG Rover ===
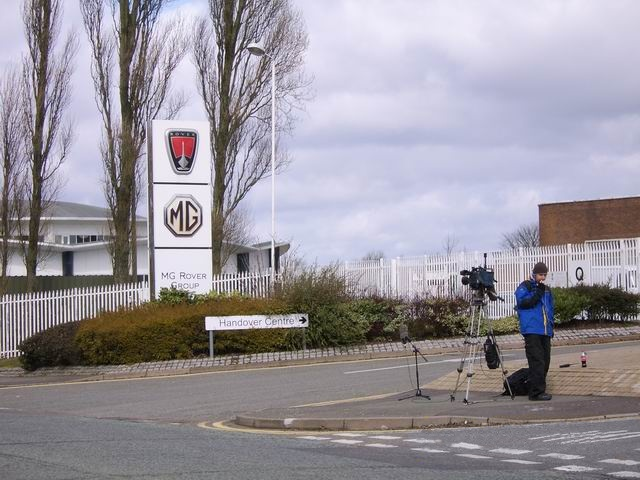
MG Rover Longbridge plant following the collapse of the company, 2006

Four years later and after spending £16m the Government finally released the report investigating the collapse of the company. The report, which was only concerned with dealing with the directors and their actions while MG-Rover Group was still trading, revealed that the five executives involved took £42m in pay and pensions from the troubled firm before it collapsed.

The report also commented on the personal relationship between Nick Stephenson and Dr Qu Li, who was paid more than £1.6m in the 15-month period up to April 2005 for consultancy services. Additionally, fellow Director Peter Beale was accused of installing a software application, Evidence Eliminator, which may have destroyed documentation relevant to the investigation. The investigators further accused Mr Beale of giving "untruthful" evidence during interviews.

In return the directors have accused the findings of being a whitewash and a witch-hunt, and it remains unknown the exact details of the actions of key government ministers at the time of the collapse.

Conservative business spokesman Kenneth Clarke said it was right the report criticised the Phoenix Four, whose behaviour was "disgraceful". Peter Mandelson said the Phoenix group had not shown an "ounce of humility" about the firm's demise and they owed an apology to the firm's employees and creditors. However his comments that steps will be taken to disbar the five executives have been discredited, and the report at no point uses language stronger than 'inappropriate' in describing the activities of the Group Directors.

== Trading businesses ==
Phoenix Venture's main trading businesses are/were:

- Studley Castle Ltd.
- MGR Financial Ltd. - joint venture with the Royal Bank of Scotland
- MG Rover Exports Ltd. - administered by PriceWaterhouseCoopers
- Phoenix Distribution Ltd. - administered by PriceWaterhouseCoopers
- Phoenix Venture Motors Ltd. - administered by PriceWaterhouseCoopers
- MG Rover Group Ltd. - administered by PriceWaterhouseCoopers, assets sold to Nanjing Automobile
- Powertrain Ltd. - administered by PriceWaterhouseCoopers, assets sold to Nanjing Automobile
- MG Sport and Racing Ltd. - administered by PriceWaterhouseCoopers

== Other assets ==
- Studley Castle
- Powertrain Ltd

For accounting purposes, Phoenix Venture Holdings also includes various non-trading subsidiary companies that exist in name only.

These businesses include:

- MG Rover Cars UK Ltd. - incorporated 22 March 2005;
- MG Rover Powertrain Ltd. - incorporated 24 September 2003;
- MG Rover Lease Plan Ltd. - incorporated 23 January 2002;
- MG Rover OUV Ltd. - incorporated 23 January 2002;
- MG Rover Group Trustees Ltd. - incorporated 30 April 2001;
- MG Rover Group Senior Trustees Ltd. - incorporated 25 April 2001;
- MG Rover Group Contract Trustees Ltd. - incorporated 24 April 2001;
- MG Rover Executive Trust Company Ltd. - incorporated 5 October 2000;
- MG Rover Heritage Ltd. - incorporated 5 October 2000;
- MG Rover Property Holding Ltd. - incorporated 5 October 2000;
- MG Rover Dealer Trust Company Ltd. - incorporated 9 June 2000;
- MG Rover Employee Trust Company Ltd. - incorporated 9 June 2000;
- Techtronic (2000) Ltd. - incorporated 6 April 2000;
- Rover Financial Services (GB) Ltd. - incorporated 3 April 1997;
- Phoenix Venture Leasing 2 Ltd. - incorporated 22 February 1995;
- Phoenix Venture Leasing Ltd. - incorporated 11 October 1987;
- MG Rover PAW Ltd. - incorporated 7 April 1986;
- MG Rover Dealer Properties Ltd. - incorporated 14 February 1986;
- Rover Cars Ltd. - incorporated 15 May 1984;
- MG Rover Overseas Holding Ltd. - incorporated 29 October 1980;
- Wolseley Motors Ltd. - incorporated 8 June 1979;
- MG Rover Wholesale Ltd. - incorporated 28 March 1946; and,
- Rover Company Ltd. - incorporated 13 June 1896

== MG Motor ==
Following MG Rover's collapse, in July 2005, Nanjing Automobile Corporation (NAC) purchased the MG marque, the Longbridge plant, and its production tooling for £53 million (US$97 million). NAC outbid the larger SAIC Motor, which had also sought to acquire the brand. Although SAIC was able to secure the intellectual property rights for the Rover 75 and Rover 25 models, it was unable to acquire the Rover trademark, which was purchased by Ford from BMW in 2006. SAIC responded by creating the Roewe brand to produce and market the former Rover vehicles in China.

On 12 April 2006, NAC formally established NAC MG UK Limited as the UK-based holding company for the Longbridge plant and the MG marque. Production of MG vehicles, including the MG TF, MG3, and MG7, resumed at an NAC facility in Nanjing on 27 March 2007, with production tooling shipped from Longbridge. In August 2008, production of the MG TF LE500, MG TF135 and MG TF 85th Anniversary models also restarted at the Longbridge plant in the UK.

On 26 December 2007, NAC merged into SAIC, becoming its subsidiary. This merger granted SAIC full control of NAC MG and resolved a production bottleneck for its Roewe brand, as NAC owned the rights to Rover engine production and other key technologies. In early 2009, NAC MG UK Limited was renamed MG Motor UK Limited and became the national sales company for the UK market.
