= Evidence Eliminator =

- Developer: Robin Hood Software
- Operating system: Windows
- Available in: English
- Type: Privacy
- License: Proprietary software
- Website: http://www.evidence-eliminator.com

Evidence Eliminator is a computer software program that runs on Microsoft Windows operating systems at least through Windows 7. The program deletes hidden information from the user's hard drive that normal procedures may fail to delete. Such "cleaner" or "eraser" programs typically overwrite previously allocated disk space, in order to make it more difficult to salvage deleted information. In the absence of such overwrite procedures, information that a user thinks has been deleted may actually remain on the hard drive until that physical space is claimed for another use (i.e. to store another file). When it was offered for sale, the program cost between $20 early on to $150 later.

== History ==
Evidence Eliminator was produced by Robin Hood Software, based in Nottingham, England, up to version 6.04.

== Controversy ==
There has been controversy surrounding Evidence Eliminator's marketing tactics. The company has used popup ads to market the program, including claims that the user's system was being compromised. In response, Robin Hood Software produced a "dis-information page" addressing these concerns. Radsoft, a competitor to Robin Hood, criticised its operation.

== Legal ==
On June 1, 2005, Peter Beale, one of the "Phoenix Four" used Evidence Eliminator to remove all trace of certain files from his PC the day after the appointment of DTI inspectors to investigate the collapse of MG Rover.

In a 2011 case, MGA v. Mattel, a federal court found that a former employee used the program to delete information that he was accused of giving to MGA while employed at Mattel.
