= VVC =

VVC may refer to:

- Variable Valve Control, an automobile variable valve timing technology
- Versatile Video Coding, a video compression standard developed by ISO/IEC MPEG and ITU-T VCEG
- Victor Valley College, of Victorville, California
- Virtual value chain, a business model
- All-Russia Exhibition Centre, abbreviated as GAO "VVC" (Gosudarstvennoye Aktsionernoye Obshchestvo "Vserossiyskiy Vystavochny Centr")
- La Vanguardia Airport (IATA code VVC)
- Vulvovaginal candidiasis, more commonly known as vaginal yeast infection
- Vamos Vamos Cojedes, a regionalist political party in the state of Cojedes, Venezuela
