= MG TF =

MG TF may refer to two roadster automobile models produced by MG Cars:

- MG TF (1953), produced from 1953 to 1955
- MG TF (2002), produced from 2002 to 2005, and then from 2007 to 2011
