= John Towers (businessman) =

British businessman

- Born: 30 March 1948 (age 77)
- Citizenship: British
- Occupation: Businessman
- Years active: 1966–2005
- Employer(s): MG Rover Group; Rover Group; Phoenix Venture Holdings; Perkins Engines

John Towers CBE (born 30 March 1948) is a British businessman, who was the owner and managing director of MG Rover Group from 2000 until the company entered administration in 2005. This followed a succession of senior appointments within Rover, which he had joined from Massey Ferguson in 1988.

Towers started his career in 1966 as a student apprentice with Perkins Engines of Peterborough, which by that time had become a subsidiary of Massey Ferguson. He rose within Perkins to become Director of Engineering before leaving in 1988 to join the Rover Group.

Together with Peter Beale, Nick Stephenson and John Edwards, Towers formed Phoenix Venture Holdings (PVH) which bought Rover Group for £10 in April 2000. In addition they also bought the Studley Castle, a conference hotel.

They subsequently purchased Midland Powertrain, MG Rover's engine plant from BMW for £20. Finally, for £50 along with an undisclosed sum from the Royal Bank of Scotland, they purchased Rover Capital, (now MG Rover Capital) a book of Rover car loans.

Kevin Howe was appointed MG Rover's Managing Director in July 2000.

In April 2005, MG Rover went into administration, following the collapse of takeover talks with Shanghai Automotive Industry Corporation (SAIC). Towers was heavily criticised for his role in the company's demise, and the Phoenix Consortium's conduct relating to Rover Group was initially referred to the Serious Fraud Office (SFO), although after initial investigations the SFO concluded that no further action would be taken. Following publication of a government report into the failure of MG Rover, Towers – along with the other directors of Phoenix – has been disqualified from holding any company office in the United Kingdom or has undertaken not to do so.

Towers ran MG Rover until 2005, when it collapsed with the loss of 6,500 jobs. PVH was found to have given management "unreasonably large" payouts, a government-commissioned report found, which were "out of all proportion". Towers awarded himself £8.958m whilst nearly all employees lost their jobs.

Nanjing Automobile subsequently brought MG out of administration, but have since moved production to China.
