= Powertrain Ltd =

Defunct British car engine manufacturer

MG Rover Powertrain Limited
- Industry: Engines and Gearboxes
- Founded: 2000
- Defunct: 2005
- Fate: Liquidated
- Headquarters: Longbridge, Birmingham, UK
- Key people: John Towers
- Products: K-Series Engine; L-Series Diesel Engine; Rover PG1 Gearbox
- Parent: Phoenix Venture Holdings

Powertrain Ltd was a British company based in Birmingham which made some cars, manufactured and marketed car engines and transmissions. The company was owned by MG Rover Group and Phoenix Venture Holdings and was based in the South Works at Rover's Longbridge plant. The companies main products were the K-Series four-cylinder petrol engine, KV6 six-cylinder petrol engine and the L-Series four-cylinder diesel engine. The company mainly produced engines for MG Rover between 2000 and 2005 but also supplied Land Rover with the L-Series and K-Series engines for the Land Rover Freelander which was developed by Rover Group in the 1990s during the ownership by BMW and British Aerospace. As well as Land Rover, K-Series engines were also supplied to many small mass production car companies like MG Rover such as FSO and SAPIA.

== History ==
The company was formed as part of MG Rover Group after the sale of the Rover and MG assets from BMW to Phoenix Venture Holdings for £10.00 in 2000 when BMW broke up the Rover Group. The MG Rover Group had to purchase the Powertrain business from BMW after 2000 for a separate sum of money to the £10.00 for the MG Rover business. Before the administration of Powertrain Limited, the MG Rover Group and its parent company, PVH sold the assets of the K-Series four and six cylinder engine to SAIC for £67 Million when the 25 and 75 platforms and technology were also sold to SAIC.

The company was placed into administration on the 8 April 2005. On 22 July 2005 the joint administrators PricewaterhouseCoopers announced the sale of the assets of Powertrain and the MG Rover Group to Nanjing Automobile (Group) Corporation.

Prior to the company going into administration, the Health and Safety Executive reported 101 cases of a respiratory disease outbreak at its Longbridge factory.

Powertrain produced engines for the MG Rover Group, Land Rover and several other companies around the world due to the success of the K-Series engine

== Products ==
Their main products were:

- K-series four-cylinder unleaded engines
- KV6 V6 unleaded engine
- L-series turbo diesel engine
- PG1 gearbox

In addition to supplying engines and transmissions to MG and Rover cars, Powertrain Ltd also supplied engines to other vehicle manufacturers including Land Rover, Lotus Cars, Poland FSO (K-series), Caterham Cars, SAIPA as well as many Chinese automakers.
