= Variable Valve Control =

Automobile variable valve timing technology

VVC (Variable Valve Control) is an automobile variable valve timing technology developed by Rover and applied to some high performance variants of the company's K Series 1800cc engine.

== About ==
In order to improve the optimisation of the valve timing for differing engine speeds and loads, the system is able to vary the timing and duration of the inlet valve opening. It achieves this by using a complex and finely machined mechanism to drive the inlet camshafts. This mechanism can accelerate and decelerate the rotational speed of the camshaft during different parts of its cycle. e.g. to produce longer opening duration, it slows the rotation during the valve open part of the cycle and speeds it up during the valve closed period.

The system has the advantage that it is continuously variable rather than switching in at a set speed. Its disadvantage is the complexity of the system and corresponding price. Other systems will achieve similar results with less cost and simpler design (electronic control).

For a more detailed description, see the sandsmuseum link below.

== Applications ==
=== MG Rover cars ===
- MG F / MG TF
- MG ZR
- Rover 200 / 25

=== Non MG/Rover cars ===
- Lotus Elise
- Caterham 7
- Caterham 21
- GTM Libra

== See also ==
- Variable Valve Timing
- Rover K-Series engine
