= MG Rover Group =

Former British car manufacturer

- Industry: Automobiles
- Predecessor: Rover Group
- Founded: May 2000; 26 years ago
- Defunct: April 2005; 21 years ago
- Fate: Administration, with £1.4 billion in debt, later liquidated
- Successor: MG Motor
- Headquarters: Longbridge, Birmingham, United Kingdom
- Number of locations: Longbridge plant, Birmingham; Cofton Hackett
- Key people: John Towers, Chairman; Peter Stevens Chief Designer Kevin Howe, Chief Executive
- Brands: MG; Rover
- Parent: Phoenix Venture Holdings
- Subsidiaries: MG Sport & Racing; MG XPower; Qvale Mangusta; BL Heritage Brands
- Website: web.archive.org/web/*/http://www.mg-rover.com

MG Rover Group was a British carmaker that existed between 2000 and 2005. It was the last domestically owned mass-production car manufacturer in the British motor industry. The company was formed when BMW sold the car-making and engine manufacturing assets of the original Rover Group to Phoenix Venture Holdings in 2000.

MG Rover went into administration in 2005 and its key assets were purchased by Nanjing Automobile Group, with Nanjing restarting MG sports car and sports saloon production in 2007. During that year Nanjing merged with SAIC Motor (the largest vehicle manufacturer in China). In 2009 the UK subsidiary was renamed MG Motor UK. The MG TF was manufactured at the former MG Rover Longbridge plant and sold in the UK from 2008 to 2010. In 2011 the first all new MG for 16 years (the MG 6) was launched in the UK (assembled at the Longbridge factory). In 2013 a supermini was added to the line up (the MG 3), this went on to help MG Motor become the fastest growing car manufacturer within the UK in 2014.

The Rover brand, which had been retained by BMW and licensed to MG Rover, was sold to Ford, which had bought Land Rover from BMW in 2000. The rights to the dormant Rover brand were sold by Ford, along with the Jaguar Cars and Land Rover businesses, to Tata Motors in 2008.

MG Rover Group was formally dissolved on 28 May 2023, more than 18 years after it was originally put into administration in April 2005.

== History ==
=== Establishment ===
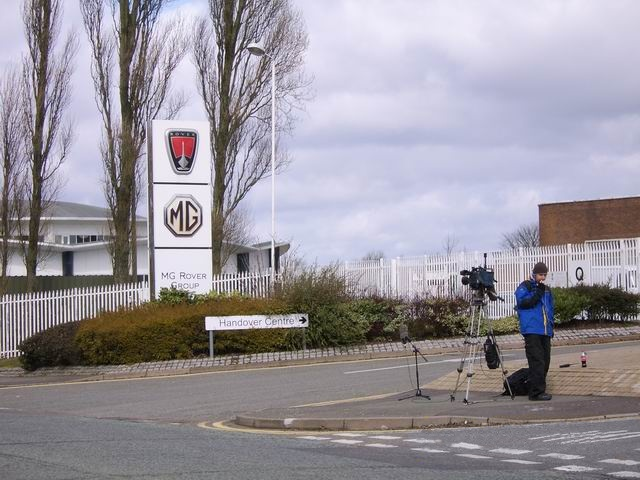
The MG Rover factory at the Longbridge plant, 2006

MG Rover was formed from the parts of the former Rover Group volume car production business which BMW sold off in 2000 due to constant losses and a declining market share. BMW had acquired the Rover Group from British Aerospace in 1994 and had since sold the Land Rover business to Ford, and split off the MINI business as a new BMW subsidiary based in Cowley. MG Rover took control of the volume component of the former Rover Group, which in turn had evolved from British Leyland and the British Motor Corporation - formerly Austin and Morris), which by now consisted solely of the Longbridge plant in Birmingham.

Of the Rover Group's other major plants; Solihull had already been divested as part of the sale of Land Rover to Ford, whilst the Cowley and Swindon plants were retained by BMW for the production of the new MINI family of vehicles. As part of these changes, all remaining Rover volume production at Cowley (essentially now just the Rover 75 as the Rover 600/800 ranges had already been discontinued by this point), was moved to Longbridge, whilst MG Rover would be allowed to continue manufacturing the original Mini at Longbridge until the new MINI was launched by BMW a year later.

=== Phoenix Consortium ownership ===
When BMW sold off its interests, MG Rover was bought for a nominal £10 in May 2000 by a specially assembled group of businessmen known as the Phoenix Consortium. The consortium was headed by ex-Rover Chief Executive John Towers. When Phoenix took over, their first loss for the last eight months of 2000 were reported to be around £400 million. By 2004, the company had reduced the losses to around £80 million but never made a profit.

MG Rover's best year for car sales was their first full year of business, in 2001 – when they sold over 170,000 cars. In 2004 their sales had declined to around 120,000. The company ceased trading on 8 April 2005, with debts of over £1.4 billion, after a proposed alliance with SAIC collapsed.

In relation to this, accounting firm Deloitte was fined £14 million (US$22 million) in September 2013 for failing to manage conflicts of interest. Deloitte had acted as corporate finance advisers to firms involved with MG Rover and the Phoenix Consortium, including tax advice while Deloitte audited MG Rover. An independent tribunal refused to grant the right to appeal a finding that Deloitte failed to consider public interest, as of November 2013.

=== Aborted deal with SAIC ===
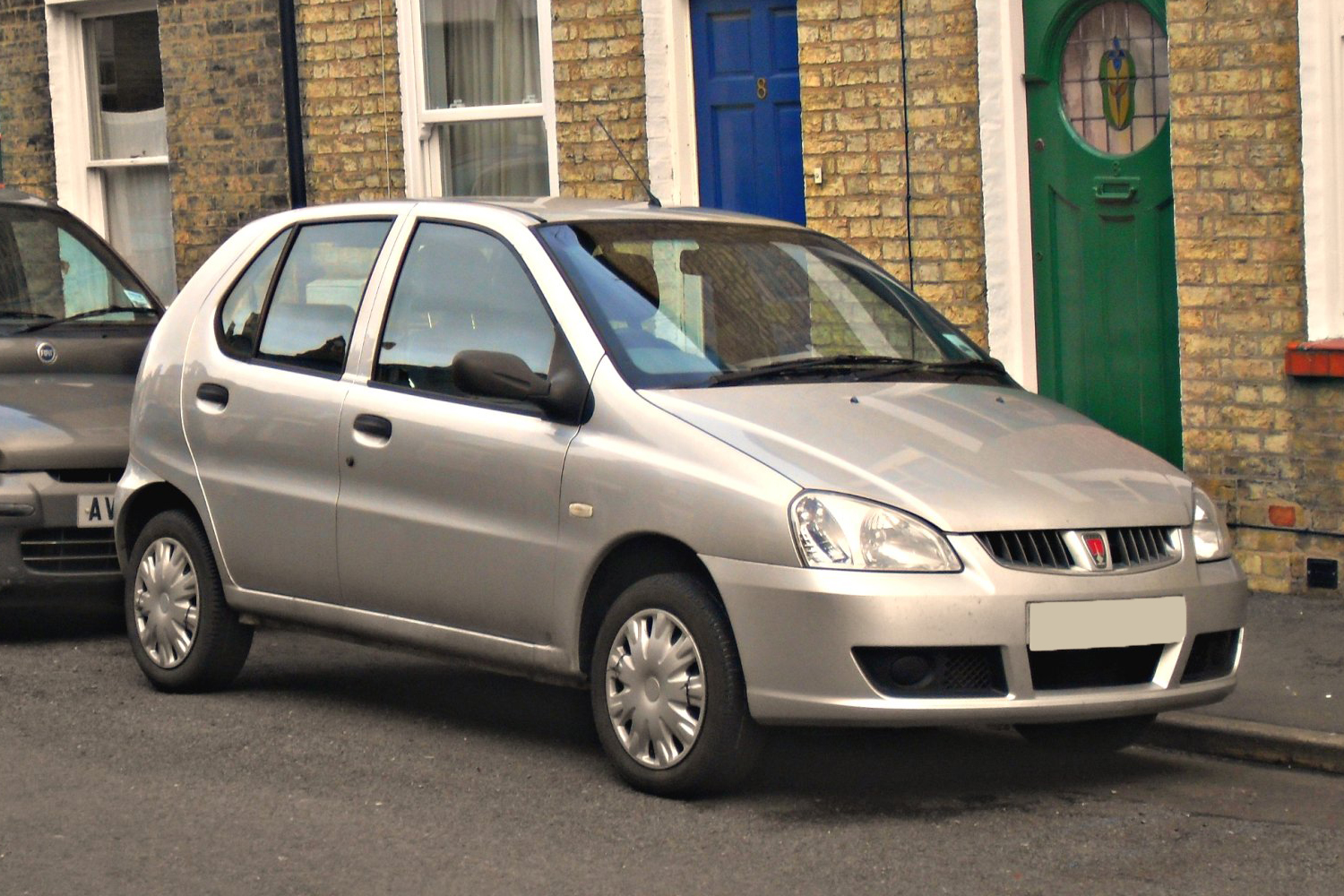
The Rover CityRover (2003), a collaborative venture between MG Rover and Tata Motors

In June 2004, it was learned that Shanghai Automotive Industry Corporation had signed a joint venture partnership to develop new models and technologies with MG Rover. This led to much speculation among the British media suggesting the Chinese company was poised to launch a takeover. Later that year, in November, news broke of an agreement between the two companies to create a joint venture company to produce up to a million cars a year, with the production shared between MG Rover's Longbridge site and locations in China. SAIC were to have a 70% stake in this company in return for a £1 billion investment, with MG Rover owning the remaining 30%. However, this agreement had to be ratified by the Chinese government, specifically its National Development and Reform Commission (NDRC). The Commission held the opinion that if BMW could not make a success of Rover, then it would be hard for SAIC to do so. On 8 December 2004, Tata of India, which had cooperated over the export of the Tata Indica as the CityRover, threatened to cease its agreement with MG Rover if the SAIC tie-up went ahead, according to the Indian press. Tata claimed the report was inaccurate two days later.

In January 2005, it was revealed that British Prime Minister Tony Blair had intervened to support the alliance between MG Rover and SAIC. MG Rover could not give a date on which the agreement would be finalized. In April 2005, it was reported that the partnership deal with SAIC was in trouble because the British Government had decided to withdraw its offer of a £120 million loan to keep the deal going. On 7 April 2005 the company announced that it was suspending production because of component shortages. Later in the day, it was announced by Patricia Hewitt, the Secretary of State for Trade and Industry, that the company was being placed in receivership. Her statement was based on a conversation with MG Rover chairman, John Towers. It was later denied by MG Rover Group, although the company admitted that it had engaged PricewaterhouseCoopers, the accountancy firm, to advise on its current financial situation. In the event, MG Rover placed itself in administration on 8 April 2005, a different status from receivership under British law. On 8 April 2005, British Prime Minister Tony Blair and Gordon Brown, the Chancellor of the Exchequer, and Richard Burden, Labour M.P. for Birmingham Northfield visited Tony Woodley at the offices of the Transport and General Workers' Union in Birmingham and stated that there might be some hope for the future of the company, although not the original deal agreed with SAIC.

On 10 April 2005, MG Rover announced that they had received a £6.5M loan from the British Government. This would cover workers' wages for one week while buy-out proposals were made to SAIC. The same week, SAIC denied it had ever made an offer to buy MG Rover and threatened to sue anyone who attempted to make the 25 and 75 models. SAIC purchased the technical rights to manufacture Rover's 25 and 75 models, and for the Powertrain Ltd business, for £67M. It did not acquire the Rover name, which was still owned by BMW at the time.

=== Financial ruin and liquidation ===
On 15 April 2005, it was announced that SAIC had once again rejected pleas to buy out the company. With no other rescue deal in the pipeline, the administrators were not in a position to seek further funding from the government and announced that redundancy notices to Longbridge staff (who numbered more than 6,000) would be issued. As well as the job losses at Longbridge, the months which followed the collapse of MG Rover resulted in many job losses in the supply chain, as well as jobs in MG Rover dealerships, as these businesses either went bankrupt, were faced with having to make job cuts, or in the case of some dealerships switched to different brands. By the end of April 2005, Sir Richard Branson had reportedly expressed an interest in buying the remaining assets of the company for the purpose of reviving the marque in order to enter the hybrid automobile market, and several other parties were also rumoured as wishing to buy the remnants. These included two Russian businessmen, although one of them denied any interest in buying the company's assets. The Iranian state-owned car manufacturer, SAIPA who had worked with MG Rover installing the K series engine in a car for the Iranian market that was based on the old Mazda 121 and Kia Pride, were also rumoured to be potential buyers.

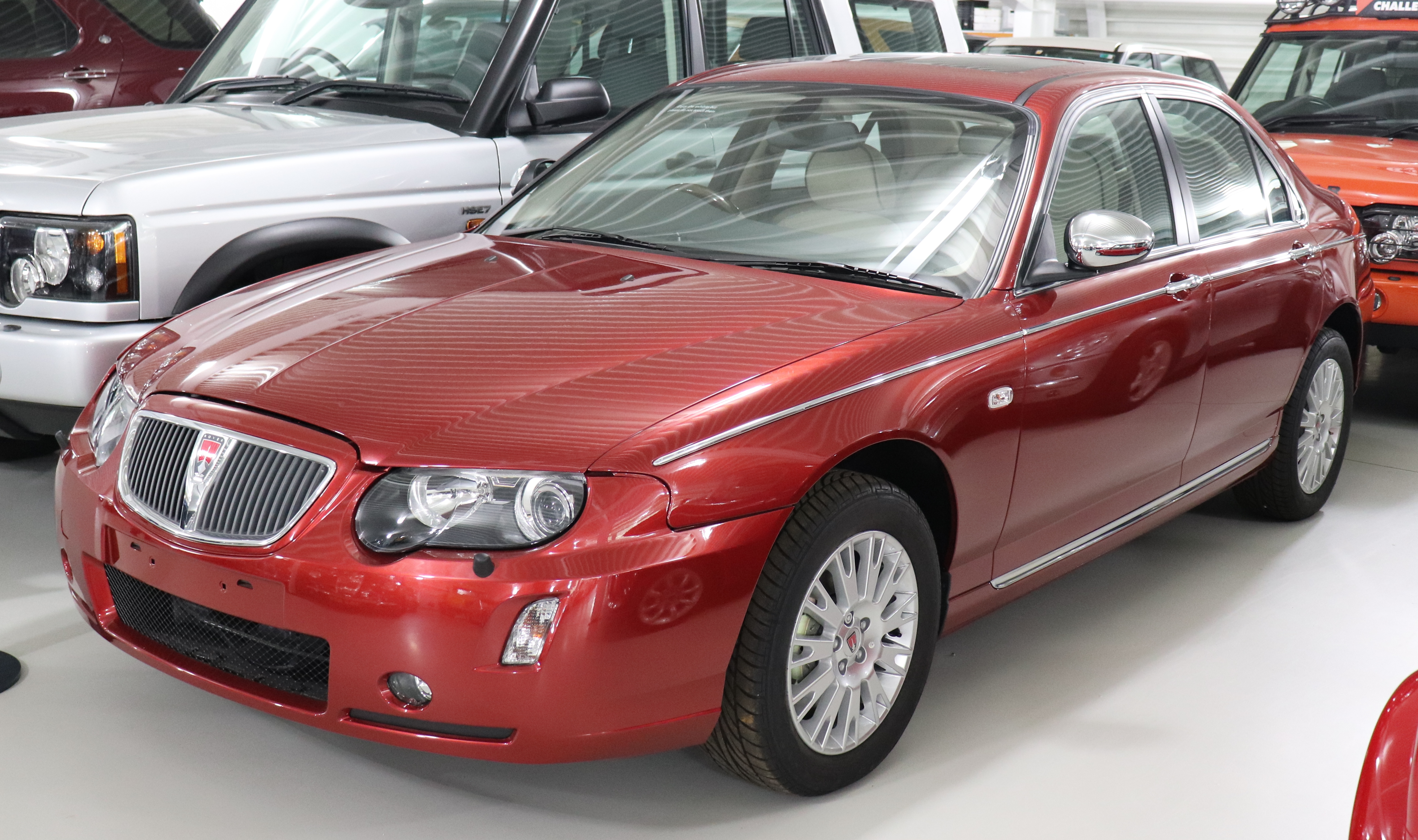
The last production Rover 75 model, a CDTi Connoisseur, 2005

SAIC had claimed that it had already acquired intellectual property rights in some Rover products for £67 million in the autumn of 2004, including the Rover 25, the Rover 75 and the Rover Powertrain K-series engine, but the Administrators advised that there was still interest in saving some other parts of the company, including MG, and 13 May 2005 was set as the deadline for bids from potential investors. On 20 May 2005, the Administrators announced that, after considering numerous proposals, they had entered talks with two unnamed "overseas companies" with a view to restarting one or more of the Longbridge production lines. Nevertheless, the following week they informed creditors that they by then expected the company to proceed instead to a creditors' voluntary liquidation, setting the date for a preliminary Creditors' Meeting to be held in Birmingham on 10 June 2005. At that meeting, creditors learned that so little of value was left in the company that there would probably be negligible or even no repayment of its outstanding debt and that, although three bidders were then still negotiating to acquire the company intact as a going concern, the Administrators had instructed their agents to prepare for the piecemeal sale of the very few remaining assets in the event that satisfactory negotiations for the sale of the entire business were not concluded.

On 14 July 2005, it was reported that Magma Holdings, a financial group including former Ford Motor Company and General Motors executives, working in conjunction with SAIC, would be making an offer for the assets of both MG Rover and engine maker Rover Powertrain which, if successful, would see at least some production being restarted at Longbridge, and that talks with the other two interested parties – China's Nanjing Automobile Group and Project Kimber (a consortium of Birmingham businessmen led by David James) – were still in progress. More than 6,000 workers at MG Rover lost their jobs when the company went into liquidation. As many as 25,000 jobs were reported to have been lost in related supply industries, meaning that the total number of job losses brought on by MG Rover's collapse was somewhere in the region of 30,000.

=== Nanjing ===
On 18 July, Magma Holdings and SAIC formalized their bid with a reported offer of £60M, with a number of additional conditions. However, that offer was not well received, and on 22 July, the Administrators announced that the principal remaining assets of the group had been sold to the Nanjing Automobile Group for around £53M, with a deposit of around $5M. Nanjing Automobile Group indicating that their preliminary plans involved relocating the Powertrain engine plant to China and splitting car production into Rover lines in China and MG lines in the West Midlands (though not necessarily at Longbridge), where a UK R&D and technical facility would also be developed. But on 27 August, The Daily Telegraph reported that the balance of around £47M, due on 22 August had not been paid. Citing confidentiality, the Administrators declined to comment.

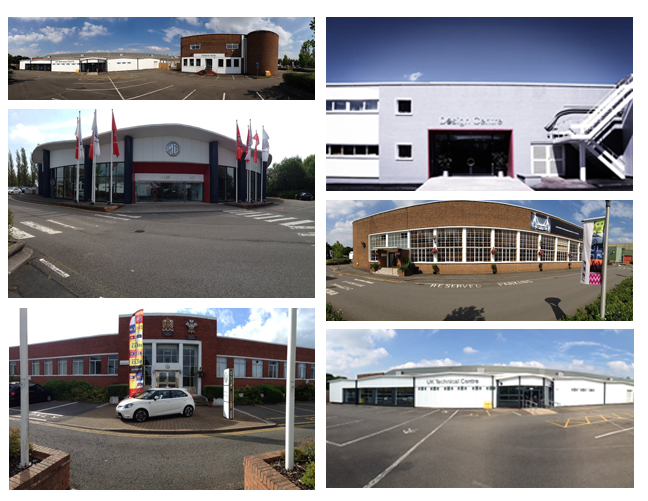
MG Motor UK HQ - SAIC UK Technical & Design Centre

Because the Rover 45 range produced at Longbridge had still had significant Honda content, originating from the companies' legacy partnership with Rover and British Leyland, Honda executives moved quickly to terminate the licensing agreement and removed tooling and assembly equipment for the car from Longbridge. Nanjing Automobile started shipping equipment from Longbridge to China on 15 September and, according to a report in The Times on Saturday, 17 September, were close to a deal with SAIC under which they would manufacture the Rover 25 and Powertrain engines while SAIC would produce a stretched Rover 75. Nanjing Automobile Group was reported to be in exclusive negotiations with GB Sports Cars, a venture by former Rover managers, to re-establish MG production at Longbridge.

In late October, key ex-workers received letters from Nanjing Automobile Corp offering 10 months' work dismantling plant at Longbridge for reassembly in China while talks with GB Sports Cars continued. However, after announcing that the UK government had not offered any substantial assistance in either grants or loans, Nanjing Automobile was also reported to have begun negotiations with at least two other potential partners, including "a wealthy San Francisco family", and, in early November, Nanjing committed to making every effort "to resume production [at Longbridge] at the beginning of 2007". In August 2008, more than three years after the facility had closed due to MG Rover's bankruptcy, assembly at Longbridge of a lightly revised MG TF roadster for the European market, from Chinese-built semi-knocked-down (SKD) kits, restarted.

SAIC Motor merged with Nanjing Automobile in 2007, whilst nearly three-quarters of the massive Longbridge factory had been demolished and its land sold off - the old South Works is the only part of the plant which has survived. By 2011 MG Motor UK as it is now known started production of the first all new MG in 16 years, the MG6. In 2013 a new super-mini was added to the line up, the MG3. This was launched in summer 2013 and during 2014 helped in making MG Motor the fastest growing vehicle manufacturer within the UK. During the spring of 2015 a new MG6 was launched and plans for a new SUV were unveiled for the following year.

== Official reports ==
The UK Government commissioned reports into the collapse of the company. The National Audit Office reported in March 2006 on the financial support provided to the company. It commended the DTI's contingency planning in 2004, but questioned whether the loan made in April 2005 achieved value for money.

In May 2005, the DTI commissioned accountants BDO Stoy Hayward to make a report under section 432 of the Companies Act 1985 on the collapse of the company; this took four years to complete at a cost of £16.3 million. In July 2009, the firm issued its report to Secretary of State for Business, Innovation and Skills Peter Mandelson, and it was published on 11 September 2009. The report revealed that five executives took £42 million in pay and pensions from the troubled firm as it collapsed. This was possible as Techtronic, the company that held the £427 million loan from BMW and was owned by the Phoenix Four, charged MG Rover interest and therefore made a profit. The report focused its criticism on the Phoenix Four and chief executive Kevin Howe who oversaw its collapse.

Other findings included evidence of a personal relationship between Nick Stephenson and a consultant who he paid more than £1.6 million in the 15-month period up to April 2005. Meanwhile, "Evidence Eliminator" software installed by Mr Beale deleted documents which were likely to have been relevant to the investigation. The investigators further accused Mr Beale of giving "untruthful" evidence during interviews.

Conservative business spokesman Kenneth Clarke said it was right the report criticised the Phoenix Four, whose behaviour was "disgraceful". Peter Mandelson said the Phoenix group had not shown an "ounce of humility" about the firm's demise and they owed an apology to the firm's employees and creditors.

The Serious Fraud Office declined to mount an investigation into the matter, but Mandelson instructed lawyers to prepare a case to disqualify the key figures at Phoenix from future company directorships. In May 2011, the Phoenix Four were disqualified as acting as company directors for varying lengths of time, totalling 19 years.

== Sales ==
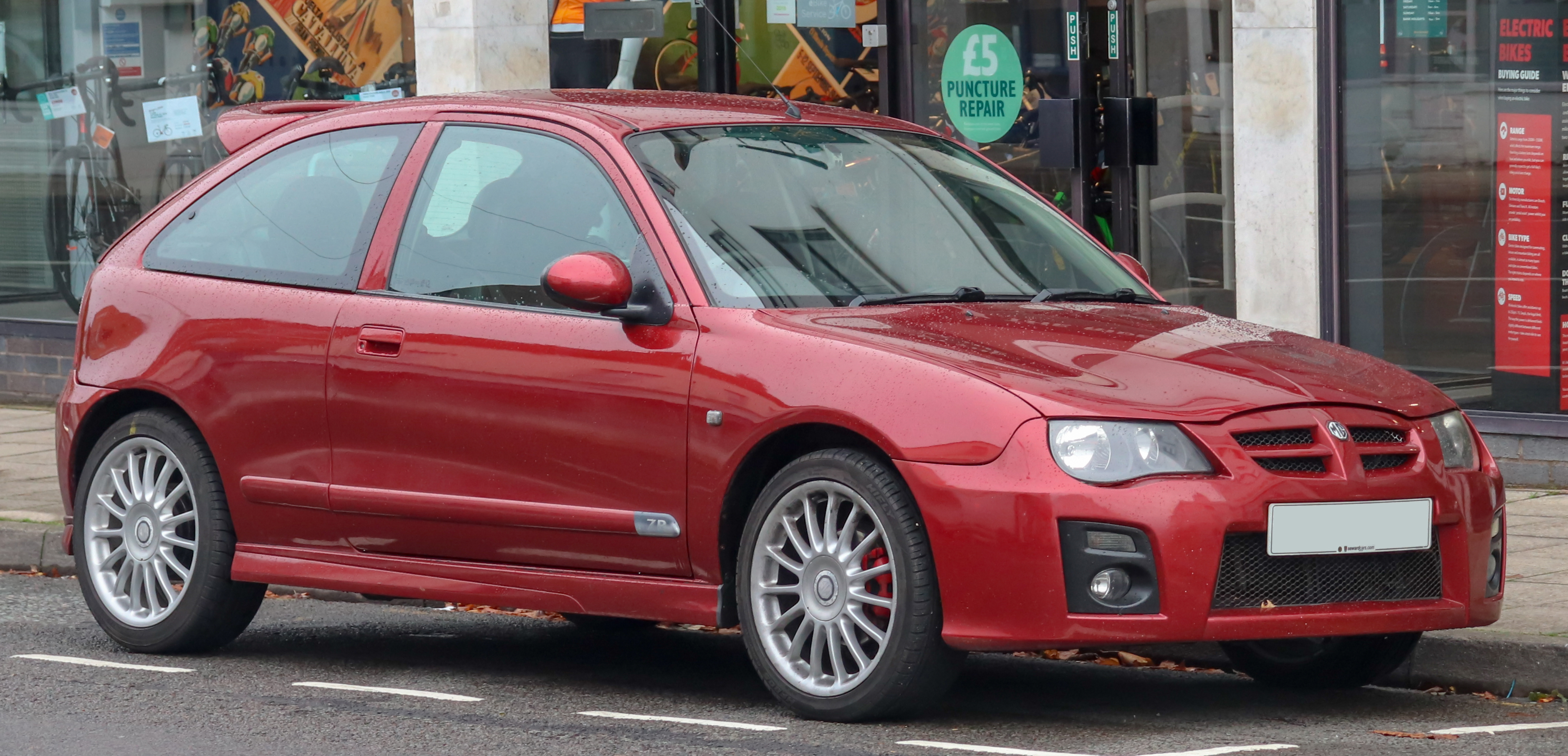
The MG ZR proved popular for MG Rover when introduced in 2001

The MG Rover range initially consisted of five cars: the Mini, Rover 25, Rover 45, Rover 75 and MG F along with car-derived van derivatives of the 25. The Mini was only built under temporary licence during the first five months of MG Rover's existence, and since the 1980s had only been built in limited numbers. After production finished, previous owner BMW regained the rights to use the brand, and did so on an all-new car that was launched in 2001, the MINI.

The Rover 25 and Rover 45 were recently facelifted versions of visibly ageing mid-1990s designs, but production figures had been slightly decreased due to a fall in demand, even though the Rover 25 had been Britain's best-selling car of the month in April 2000. Both cars still had significant Honda content within their design (for example, the 25 still used underpinnings based on the 1989 Honda Concerto and the related Series II Rover 200, whilst the 45 was essentially a rebadged Honda Civic/Domani outfitted with a K-series engine) - a legacy from Rover's one time partnership with Honda, which necessitated paying the Japanese company significant royalties on every car sold which further dented the profitability of those models.

The acclaimed Rover 75 was little over a year old, and after a slow start sales were rising. An estate version was launched following the shift of production from Cowley to Longbridge. The replacement for the MG F, the MG TF sports car was, inevitably, a relatively low-volume product, but it had consistently been the most popular car in its sector since its 1995 launch.

The Rover 25 and Rover 45 endured disappointing sales throughout MG Rover's existence, though their MG ZR and MG ZS sports variants proved popular from their launch in 2001. The Rover 75 and its MG ZT sports variant enjoyed more popularity.

The range further expanded in 2003 with the launch of the smallest model, the Indian-built CityRover, built as part of a venture with Tata, and a flagship model, the MG XPower SV, based on the Qvale Mangusta. Both cars, however, failed to achieve the sales figures that MG Rover had hoped for.

Year	European sales	European market share
2000	197,940	1.32%
2001	159,685	1.06%
2002	142,355	0.97%
2003	135,227	0.94%
2004	114,069	0.71%
2005	46,583	0.29%
2006	7,783	0.05%

== Vehicles ==
MG Rover made the following vehicles during its lifetime:

Model	Picture	Years	Class
MG F		1995–2001	Roadster
MG TF		2002–2005	Roadster
MG ZR		2001–2005	Hot hatch
MG ZS		2001–2005	FF-layout Mid-size/Medium Family
MG ZT		2001–2005	5-door Executive car/Large Family
MG XPower SV		2003–2005	Sports car
Rover 25		1999–2005	Small Family Hatchback
Rover 45		1999–2005	Mid-size/Medium Family
Rover 75		1999–2005	5-door Executive car/Large Family
Rover CityRover		2003–2005	5-door Family Supermini
Rover Streetwise		2003–2005	3/5-door Crossover

== Timeline ==
=== MG Rover (2000–2005) ===
- May 2000: MG Rover was formed as the part of the former Rover Group's mass-market car business which BMW sold to the Phoenix Consortium for a nominal £10. BMW retains the Mini arm of the company and the Land Rover arm of the company is sold to Ford for £1.85 billion. Production of the Rover 75 is switched from Cowley to Longbridge following BMW's decision to retain the Cowley plant.
- 2001: MG Rover buy the factory and the rights to the platform of the Mangusta car from Qvale of Italy for an estimated £10 million.
- 2001: The Rover 75 Tourer is launched.
- 2001: The MG ZR, MG ZS and MG ZT (based on the Rover 25, Rover 45 and Rover 75 respectively) are launched as sporting alternatives to the standard Rover models.
- 2002: A revised version of the MG F is launched as the MG TF.
- 2002: MG Rover agrees to collaborate with Tata of India, with the intention of importing the Tata Indica to Europe from next year under the Rover brand.
- 2002: MG Rover also goes into talks with Brilliance China Auto with plans to build MG Rovers in a plant in China
- 2003: MG Rover launches the new MG XPower SV and SV-R sportscars, prices start at around £65,000. The car is based on the Qvale Mangusta and uses the Ford 4.6-litre V8 engine with two different power outputs.
- 2003: MG Rover launches the new CityRover - a small 5-door hatchback city car, based on the Tata Indica, the first product of the collaboration with Tata Motors. The car is built in India.
- 2003: MG Rover launches V8 variants of the Rover 75 and the MG ZT.
- 2003: MG Rover launch a restyled version of the Rover 25, the Rover Streetwise. Referred to as an "urban on-roader", it has SUV-like styling.
- 2003/04: MG Rover sell the Longbridge factory to St. Modwen Properties on a lease-back basis to raise funds.
- 2004: MG Rover launches facelifted versions of the Rover 25/45/75 and MG ZR/ZS/ZT with revised front and rear ends, with the intention of replacing these models with all-new replacements from 2006. Rover 25/45/Streetwise and MG ZR/ZS also get revised fascias.
- 2004: MG Rover enters in talks with Shanghai Automotive Industry Corporation (SAIC) about a possible collaboration, following the collapse of a proposed venture with Malaysian carmaker Proton.
- 2004: MG Rover sell design rights to the Rover 25 and 75 to SAIC to raise money to help keep the business afloat in the face of falling sales.
- 2005: Negotiations on possible joint venture with SAIC stall, and MG Rover collapses. Price Waterhouse Coopers called in as administrators. MG Rover car production ends and the Longbridge plant closes with the loss of more than 6,000 jobs.

=== Nanjing Automobile Group (2005–2016) ===
- 2005: Nanjing Automobile Group acquires the entire assets of MG Rover.
- 2005/06: Nanjing Automobile Corporation announces plans to build cars at Longbridge after signing a deal to lease the site for 33 years.
- 2006: SAIC sets up a new marque called Roewe after it failed to buy the Rover marque, and later launches a model based on an extended Rover 75 platform, called the Roewe 750.
- 2006: Ford buys the rights to the Rover marque, meaning that only the MG marque can be used on the new range of Nanjing-built cars.
- 2007: Nanjing Automobile Corporation restarts MG TF production in China.
- 2007: SAIC and Nanjing Automobile Corporation announce a tie-up and on the 26 December NAC becomes a part of SAIC.
- 2008: Production of the limited edition MG TF LE500 commences at the Longbridge plant.
- 2009: Production of the standard MG TF 135 commences at Longbridge.
- 2010: Final assembly of the MG6 from Chinese kits starts at Longbridge
- 2010: MG TF production ends due to falling demand
- 2011: MG 6 Fastback production commences
- 2016: MG production at Longbridge ends

== Sponsorship ==
MG Rover sponsored Aston Villa Football Club from 2002 to 2004, with Villa's home kit advertising Rovers and the away kit advertising MGs. Also, the company had sponsored the popular ITV murder drama series Midsomer Murders, in which a range of MG Rover cars were presented.

== Brands ==
All of the following brands were controlled by MG Rover, and were formerly the property of British Leyland.

- 1895 Wolseley
- 1905 Austin
- 1912 Morris
- 1913 Vanden Plas as a coachbuilder and as a car brand (outside the US & Canada)
- 1923 MG was created by Cecil Kimber based on Morris components
- 1930 American Austin a brand name created by Austin for US market
- 1947 Princess was created by Vanden Plas as a luxury car name
- 1987 Sterling created as a separate brand in the US by the Rover Group

The Rover brand was used under licence from BMW, and was sold to Ford following the collapse of MG Rover; it was subsequently bought in 2008 by TATA.

The MG XPower brand was created by MG Rover for their motorsport subsidiary, MG Sport and Racing Ltd. in 2001. It was subsequently used for the MG XPower SV sportscar, a higher powered version of the Qvale Mangusta, in 2005. After the demise of MG Rover, assets of MG Sport and Racing relating to the XPower SV were acquired from PWC, the Administrators, by the newly formed MG Sports and Racing Europe Ltd. However this company's use of the "MG" trademark resulted in a legal dispute with Nanjing Automobile (Group) Corporation, which had also acquired assets of the defunct MG Rover Group. This case was won by Nanjing in February 2010.
