= MG F / MG TF =

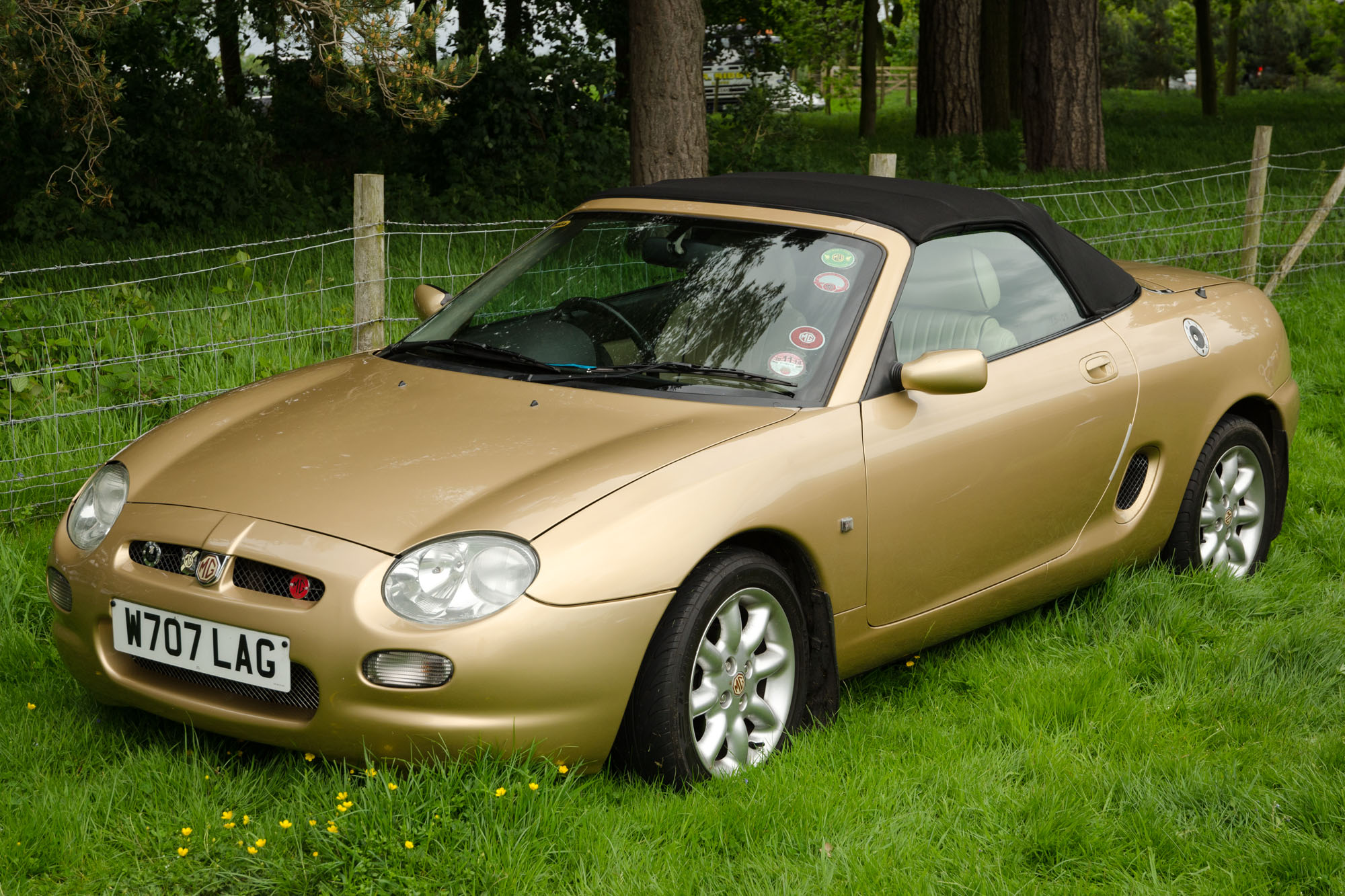
- 2000 MG F

Overview
- Manufacturer: Rover Group (1995–2000); MG Rover (2000–2005); MG Motor (2007–2011)
- Production: 1995–2011

Body and chassis
- Class: Roadster
- Body style: 2-seat convertible
- Layout: transverse mid-engine, rear-wheel drive

Chronology
- Predecessor: MGB
- Successor: MG Cyberster

The MG F and MG TF are two-seater roadster cars that were sold under the MG marque by three manufacturers between 1995 and 2011. The F and TF have a rear mid-engine, rear-wheel-drive layout with a two-door convertible design.

The MG F was the first new model designed as an MG since the MGB that was produced from 1962 to 1980, the marque spent the 1980s being used to denote performance models from then-parent Austin Rover Group, and was briefly seen on the MG RV8, a limited edition relaunch of the MG MGB which was sold between 1993 and 1995.

The MG F was initially designed by Rover Group during the period it was owned by British Aerospace and was brought to market after the business had been sold to the German car manufacturer BMW. BMW owned Rover Group and manufactured the model from 1995 to 2000. BMW broke up Rover Group in 2000, divesting the Rover and MG passenger car businesses to a management buy-out who formed the independent MG Rover business. MG Rover manufactured the MG F from 2000 onwards, heavily updating it to become the MG TF in 2002.

MG Rover entered administration in 2005, resulting in the production of the MG TF model ceasing. Some of the assets of the MG Rover business were sold to Nanjing Automobile and the MG TF resumed production under the Nanjing-owned MG Motor in 2007. The model, by then heavily outdated, was not a sales success and production ceased for a second and final time in 2011.

== History ==
MG had stopped producing sports cars in 1980 when British Leyland closed their Abingdon, Oxfordshire plant, although the badge of MG was used on badge-engineered hatchbacks and saloons between 1982 and 1991.

In 1992, the company (by this time Rover Group) restarted production of the classic MGB as the limited edition RV8, and positive reaction led the company to continue to develop the MG F. During the 1980s, a number of new MG sports cars had been hinted at with the appearance of concept cars at motor shows, but none of these cars ever went into production. The most notable of these - the MG EX-E concept in 1985 styled by Gerry McGovern - provided some subtle styling cues that would go into the eventual MG F.

By 1991, Rover was working on a new mid-engined sports car similar in size (and expected to be similar in price) to the recently launched Mazda MX5 and Lotus Elan. The final product, the MG F, was finally unveiled on 8 March 1995, and went on sale in September that year with a 1.8-litre (110 cu in) 120-brake-horsepower (89 kW; 120 PS) engine, and was joined several months later by a 145-brake-horsepower (108 kW; 147 PS) VVC (Variable Valve Control) version. The MG F received a mild facelift in August 1999, by which time a high-performance Supersport version was reportedly in the pipeline, but this version was never launched; the highest performance MG F model was the 160-brake-horsepower (120 kW; 160 PS) Trophy model which joined the range a year after the facelift.

It was revised and renamed using the historic TF name in January 2002, but production was halted, following the collapse of the MG Rover Group in April 2005. However, after Nanjing Automobile Group acquired the rights to the MG TF, the completion of the new factory for MG in Nanjing saw production being restarted in March 2007 before finally being stopped in 2011 without an immediate successor.

== MG F ==
MG F
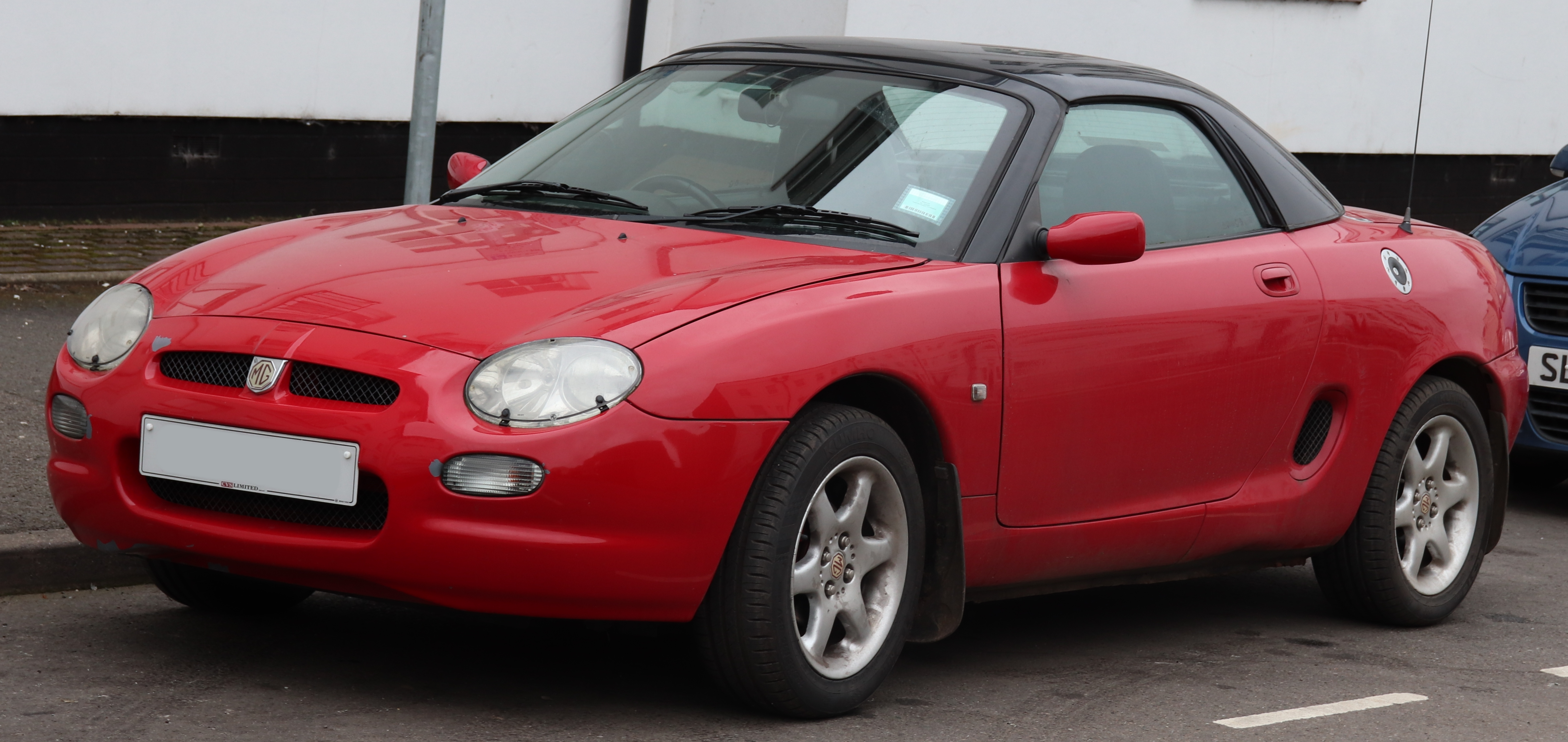

Overview
- Manufacturer: MG (Rover Group, later MG Rover)
- Production: 1995–2002
- Assembly: United Kingdom: Longbridge, Birmingham (Longbridge Plant)
- Designer: Steve Harper

Body and chassis
- Class: Roadster
- Body style: 2-seat convertible
- Layout: Transverse mid-engine, rear-wheel drive

Powertrain
- Engine: 1.6 L K-Series I4; 1.8 L K-Series I4; 1.8 L K-Series VVC I4
- Transmission: 5-speed (manual)

Dimensions
- Wheelbase: 2,388 mm (94 in)
- Length: 3,912 mm (154 in)
- Width: 1,651 mm (65 in)
- Height: 1,270 mm (50 in)

=== Mark I ===
The MG F was launched in the autumn of 1995 by the Rover Group, making it the third car to be launched after the takeover by BMW. It was powered by a 1.8-litre (110 cu in) K-Series engine with 16-valve, the basic having 118 horsepower (120 PS; 88 kW) while the more powerful VVC had 143 horsepower (107 kW; 145 PS). Rover Special Projects oversaw the development of the F's design and before finalising the styling bought-in outside contractors to determine the most appropriate mechanical configuration for the new car.

Steve Harper of MGA Developments produced the initial design concept in January 1991 (inspired by the Jaguar XJR-15 and the Ferrari 250LM), before Rover's in-house design team refined the concept under the leadership of Gerry McGovern. An interesting feature of the F was its Hydragas suspension, a system employing interconnected fluid and gas displacers.

The MG F quickly shot to the top of the affordable sports car charts in Britain and remained there until the introduction of the MG TF in 2002.

=== Mark II ===
The MG F underwent a facelift in autumn of 1999, and gave the car a revised interior as well as styling tweaks and fresh alloy wheel designs. There was also the introduction of a base 1.6-litre (98 cu in) version and a more powerful 1.8-litre (110 cu in) 160-horsepower (120 kW; 160 PS) variant called the Trophy 160 in 2001, which had a 0–60 mph time of 6.9 seconds (0–97 km/h). The Trophy was only produced for a limited time.

An automatic version with a continuously variable transmission (CVT) called the Steptronic was introduced in 2001. The MG F continued to sell well in spite of the sale of the Rover Group, which was announced in March 2000. Land Rover was sold to Ford, while the MG and Rover marques were sold to the Phoenix consortium for £10. In spite of competition from the likes of Mazda MX-5, BMW Z3 and Audi TT, the MG F still proved popular, remaining Britain's best selling convertible car. A total of 77,269 MG F's were built. And 799 Limited versions.

=== EXF ===
Project EXF represents a limited production of five single-seat MG F sports cars that allude to historic land-speed records set by MG between 1930 and 1959. Known simply as the F, the MG car features largely standard MG F components, a turbocharged 1.4-litre (85 cu in) 329-brake-horsepower (245 kW; 334 PS) Rover K-Series engine, and a drag coefficient of less than 0.25. On 20 August 1997, the F achieved a top speed of 217 mph (349 km/h) at the SpeedWeek festivities in Bonneville, Utah, United States.

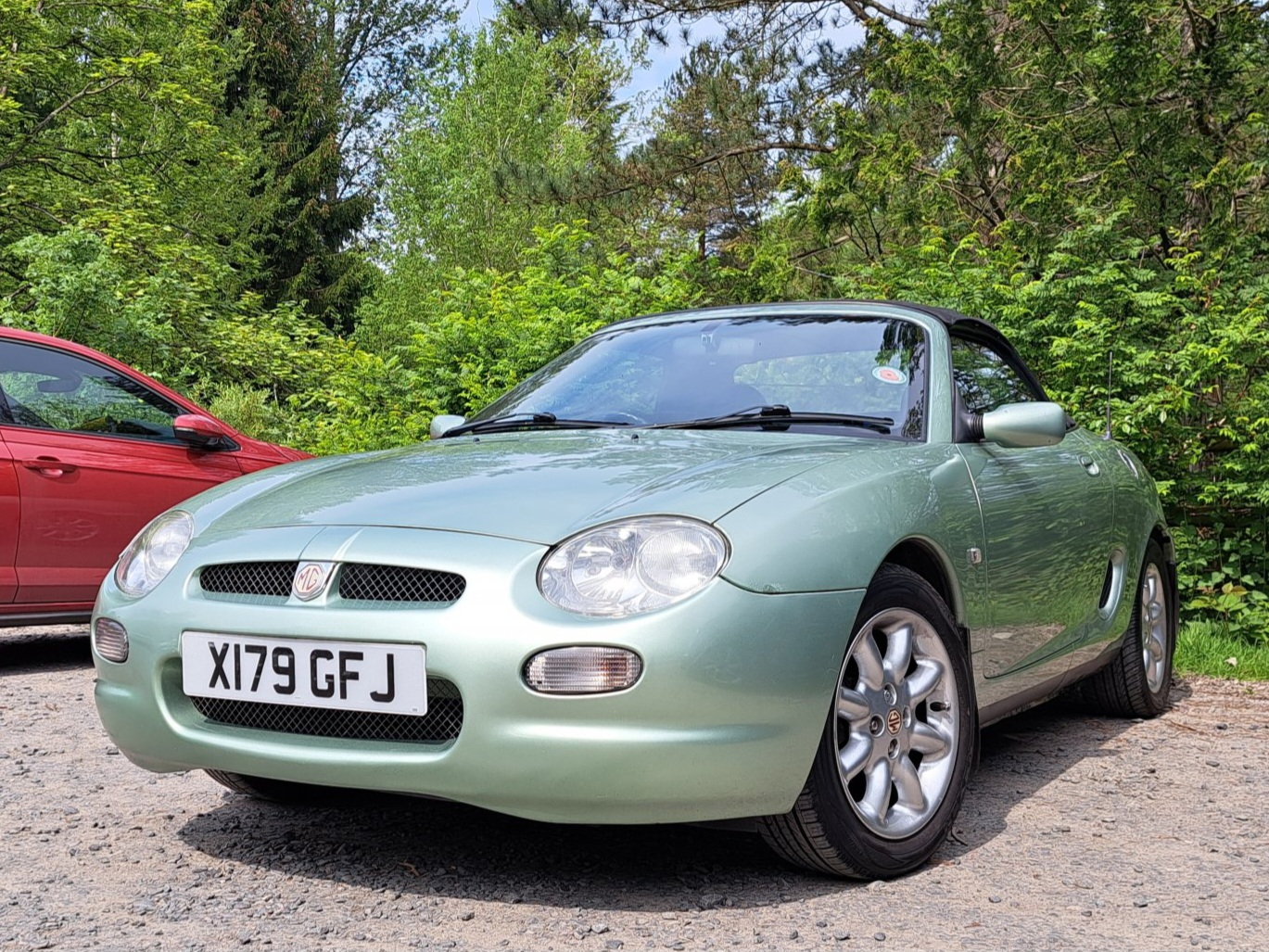
Front view

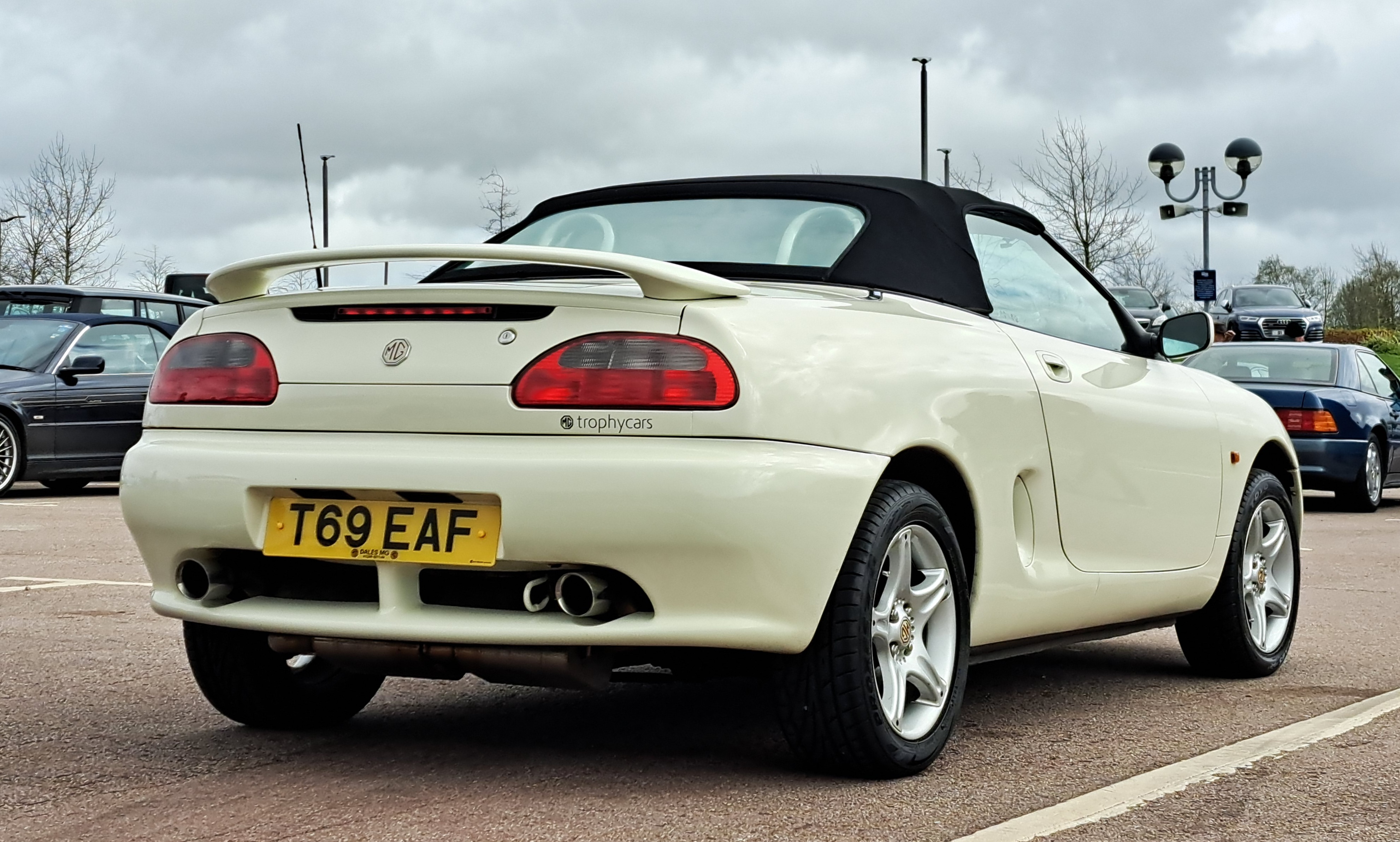
Rear view

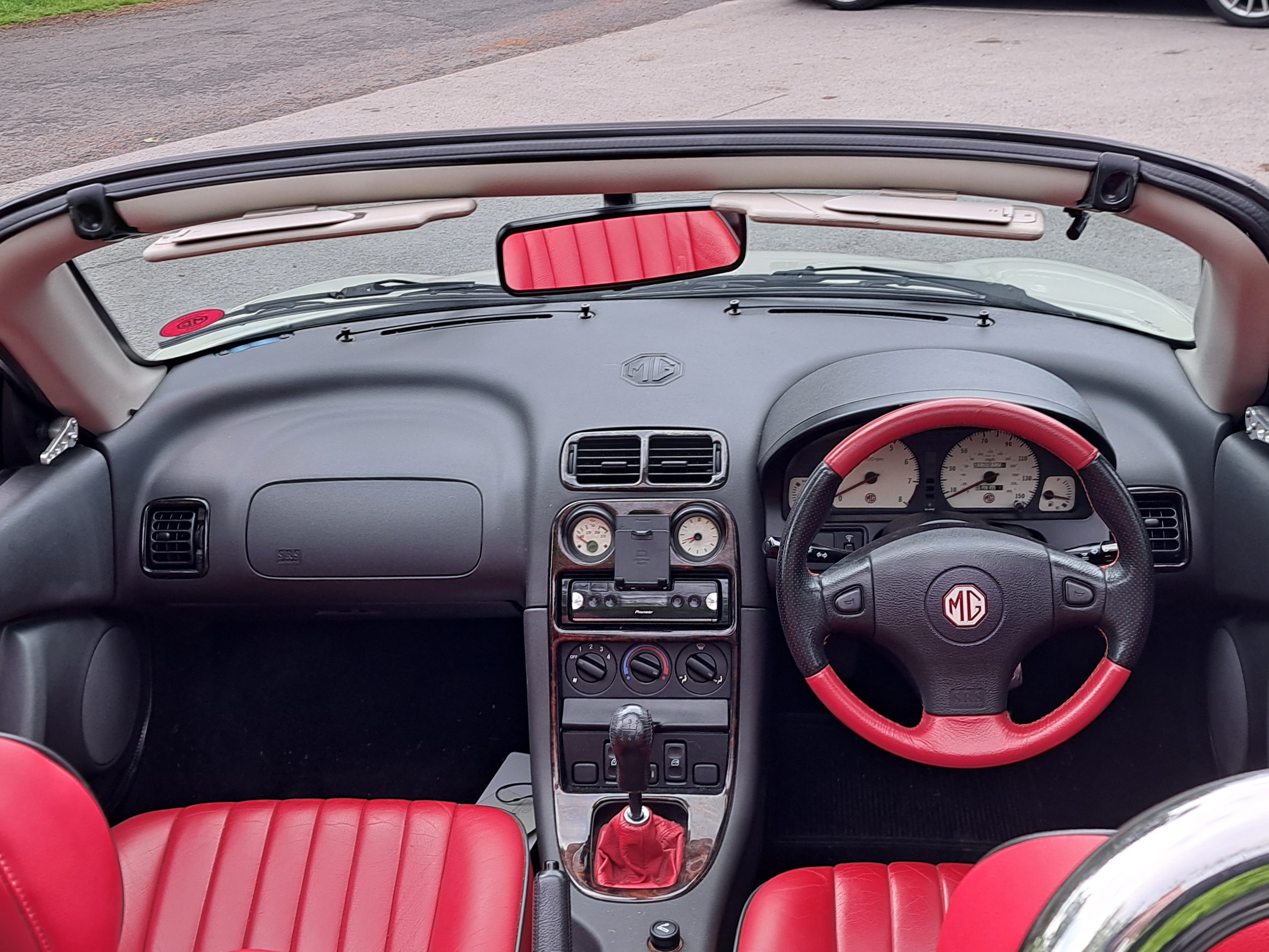
Interior

=== Engines ===
Petrol engines
| Model | Engine type | Displacement | Configuration | Power | Torque | Top speed | 0-60 mph (0–97 km/h) | CO_{2} emissions |
|---|---|---|---|---|---|---|---|---|
| 1.6 | 16K4F | 1,589 cc (1.6 L; 97.0 cu in) | I4 | 110 hp (112 PS; 82 kW) at 6250 rpm | 145 N⋅m (107 lb⋅ft) at 4700 rpm | 116 mph (187 km/h) | 9.0s | 177 g/km |
| 1.8 | 18K4F | 1,796 cc (1.8 L; 109.6 cu in) | I4 | 120 hp (122 PS; 89 kW) at 5500 rpm | 165 N⋅m (122 lb⋅ft) at 3000 rpm | 120 mph (193 km/h) | 8.5s | 182 g/km |
| 1.8 VVC | 18K4K | 1,796 cc (1.8 L; 109.6 cu in) | I4 | 145 hp (147 PS; 108 kW) at 7000 rpm | 174 N⋅m (128 lb⋅ft) at 4500 rpm | 130 mph (209 km/h) | 7.0s | 184 g/km |
| 1.8 VVC | 18K4K | 1,796 cc (1.8 L; 109.6 cu in) | I4 | 157 hp (159 PS; 117 kW) at 7000 rpm | 174 N⋅m (128 lb⋅ft) at 4500 rpm | 137 mph (220 km/h) | 6.9s | 179 g/km |

== MG TF ==
MG TF
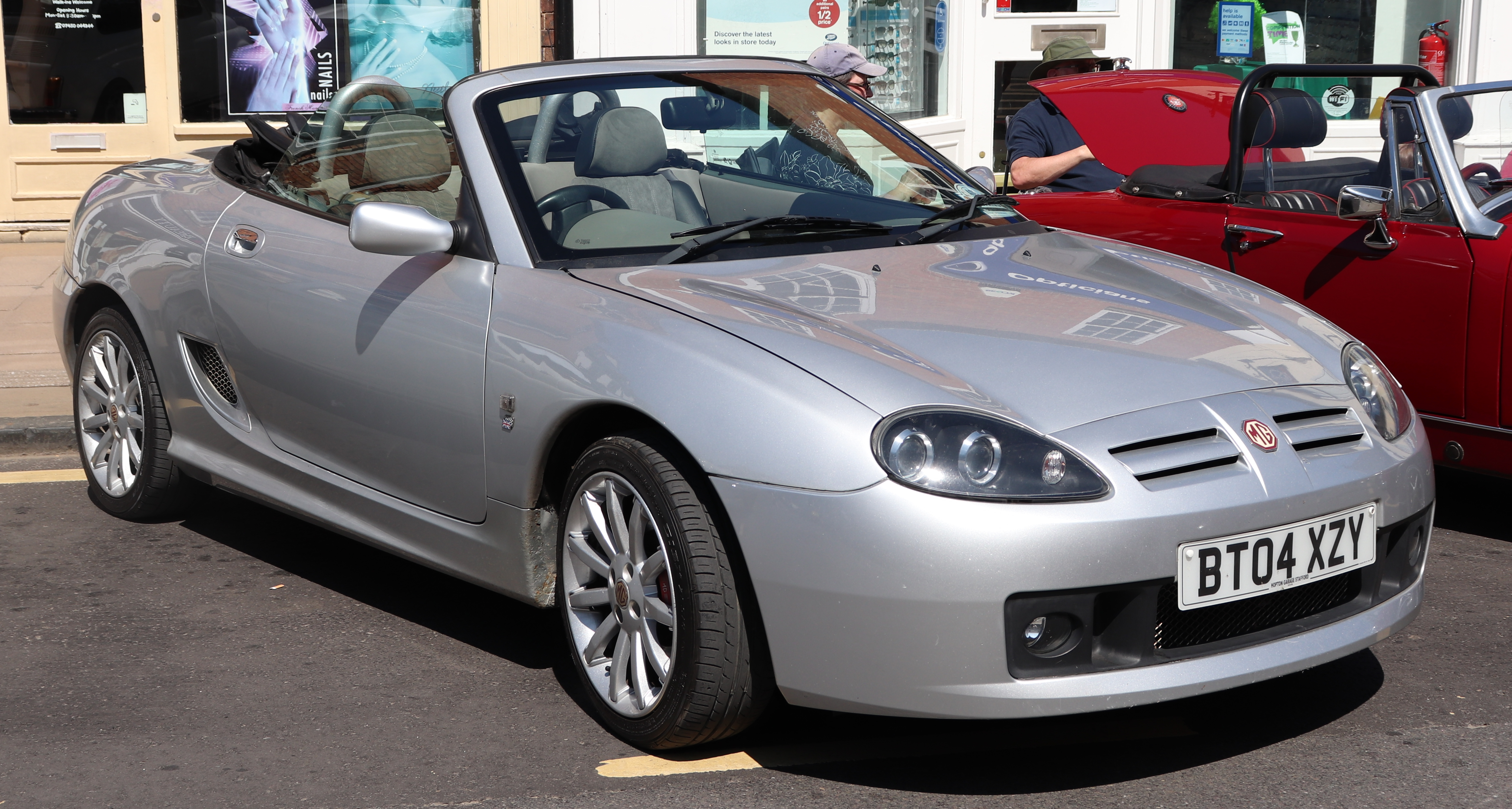

Overview
- Manufacturer: MG (MG Rover: 2002–2005); MG Motor (Nanjing, later SAIC Motor: 2007–2011)
- Production: 2002–2005; 2007–2011 (China)
- Assembly: United Kingdom: Longbridge, Birmingham (Longbridge Plant); China: Pukou, Nanjing

Body and chassis
- Class: Roadster
- Body style: 2-seat convertible
- Layout: Transverse mid-engine, rear-wheel drive

Powertrain
- Engine: 1.6 L K-Series I4; 1.8 L K-Series I4; 1.8 L K-Series VVC I4
- Transmission: 5-speed manual CVT

Dimensions
- Wheelbase: 2,380 mm (93.7 in)
- Length: 3,962 mm (156 in)
- Width: 1,651 mm (65 in)
- Height: 1,270 mm (50 in)

Chronology
- Predecessor: MGB; MG RV8

In 2002, the MG TF was released, named after the MG TF Midget of the 1950s. Based upon the MG F platform but heavily redesigned and reengineered, the most significant mechanical changes were the abandonment of Hydragas suspension in favour of conventional coil springs, the new design of the air induction system, which, along with new camshafts, produces more power than the MG F engine, and a 20% increase in the torsional stiffness of the body.

The various cosmetic changes included a revised grille and redesigned front headlights, bumpers, side air-intake grills, rear boot, etc. It generated a reasonable number of sales, despite problems that included uneven shut lines on the driver's door on United Kingdom models. Production was suspended in April 2005, when MG Rover collapsed. 39,249 MG TFs were built from 2002 until 2005.

=== Safety ===
The MG TF was assessed with four star safety performance from Euro NCAP and ANCAP.

| Euro NCAP 2003 TF | Points | Rating |
|---|---|---|
| Adult Occupant: | 26.0 out of 36 | 72% |
| Pedestrian Impact: | 19.3 out of 36 | 54% |

ANCAP test results MG TF roadster (2002)
| Test | Score |
|---|---|
| Overall | 4 /5 stars |
| Frontal offset | 14.48/16 |
| Side impact | 15.55/16 |
| Pole | Not Assessed |
| Seat belt reminders | 0/3 |
| Whiplash protection | Not Assessed |
| Pedestrian protection | Adequate |
| Electronic stability control | Not Assessed |

=== Engines ===
Petrol engines
| Model | Engine type | Displacement | Configuration | Power | Torque | Top speed | 0-60 mph (0–97 km/h) | CO_{2} emissions |
|---|---|---|---|---|---|---|---|---|
| 115 | 16K4F | 1,589 cc (1.6 L; 97.0 cu in) | I4 | 114 hp (116 PS; 85 kW) at 6,250 rpm | 145 N⋅m (107 lb⋅ft) at 4,700 rpm | 118 mph (190 km/h) | 9.2s | 169 g/km |
| 120 Stepspeed (Auto) | 18K4F | 1,796 cc (1.8 L; 109.6 cu in) | I4 | 118 hp (120 PS; 88 kW) at 5,500 rpm | 165 N⋅m (122 lb⋅ft) at 3,000 rpm | 118 mph (190 km/h) | 9.7s | 199 g/km |
| 135 | 18K4F | 1,796 cc (1.8 L; 109.6 cu in) | I4 | 134 hp (136 PS; 100 kW) at 6,750 rpm | 165 N⋅m (122 lb⋅ft) at 5,000 rpm | 127 mph (204 km/h) | 8.2s | 189 g/km |
| 160 | 18K4K | 1,796 cc (1.8 L; 109.6 cu in) | I4 | 158 hp (160 PS; 118 kW) at 6,900 rpm | 174 N⋅m (128 lb⋅ft) at 4,700 rpm | 137 mph (220 km/h) | 6.9s | 179 g/km |

== Nanjing Automobile Group production ==
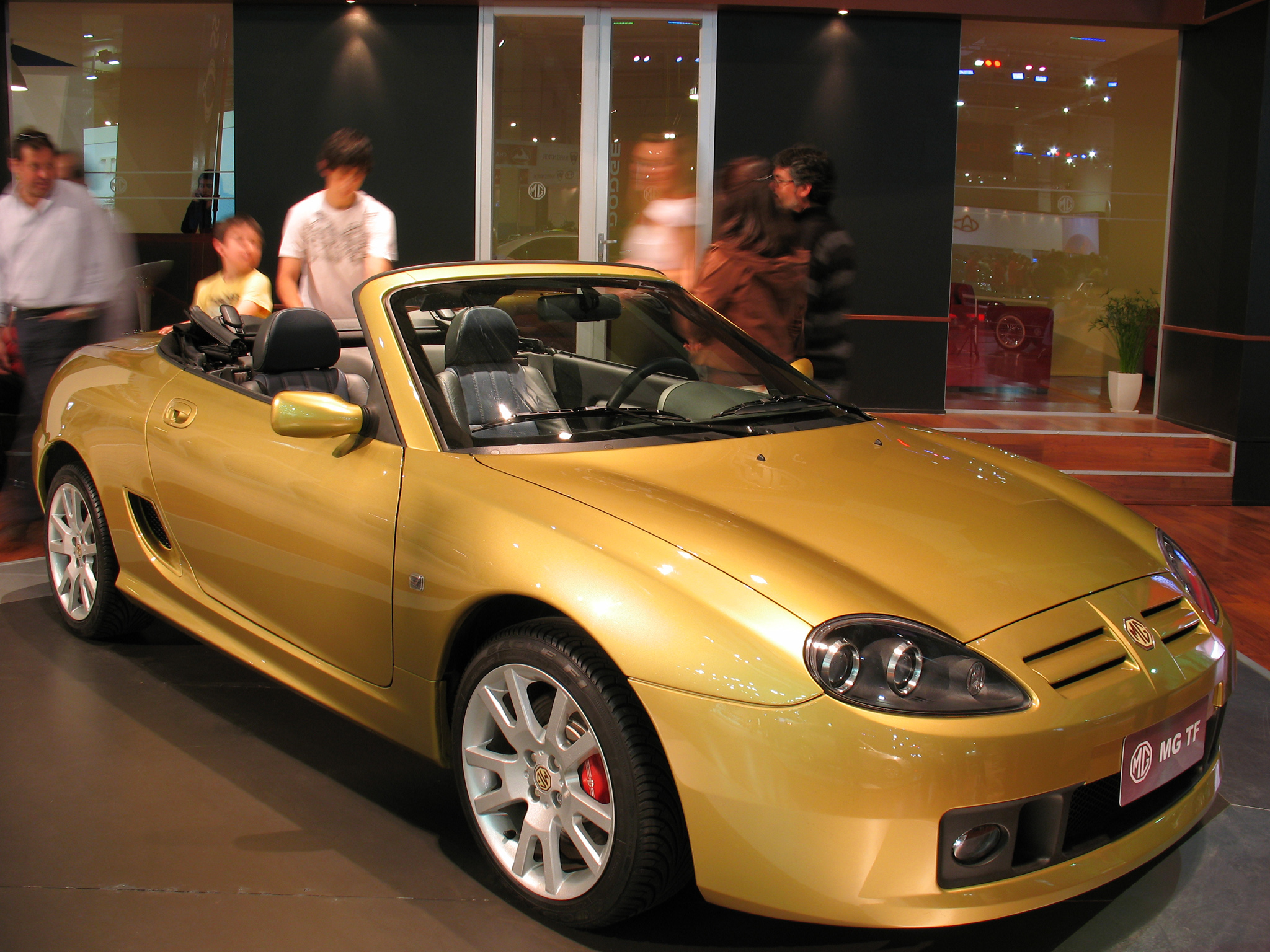
2007 Nanjing-built MG TF

In March 2007, Nanjing Automobile Group, which bought MG Rover's remaining assets during bankruptcy proceedings, restarted production of the MG TF at its Nanjing factory, with a capacity of 200,000 cars a year. Experts from the Longbridge factory were involved in building the new TFs in Nanjing.

In August 2008, more than three years after the facility had closed due to the bankruptcy of MG Rover, assembly of a lightly revised MG TF model for the European market, from Chinese built complete knock down (CKD) kits, was started by NAC MG UK at Longbridge.

The first TF model to be produced by NAC MG UK was the TF LE500. As the name suggests, this was a limited edition of five hundred cars each individually numbered. The better suspension set-up and the heated rear window from the 2005 model TF were carried over to the LE500. Styling was reminiscent of the original MGF, with an intake on either side of the MG badge, and a large single intake below the number plate.

The LE500 specification includes leather seats, hard top and soft top, wind stop, CD tuner with MP3 compatibility, rear parking sensors, sixteen-inch (41 cm) eleven-spoke alloy wheels, and front fog lights. It was priced higher than a modern Mazda MX5 despite its few changes from 2002, which had a large negative effect on sales.

The LE500 was followed by the model TF 135 and a further limited edition TF 85th Anniversary, of which only fifty were ever produced.

Production of the TF at Longbridge was suspended again in October 2009, due to low demand in face of the ongoing recession. Production resumed in the new year, but the end of production was finally announced in March 2011, due to lack of demand and component supply problems. A total of 906 TFs were produced at Longbridge under Chinese ownership.

== Concept cars ==
=== XPower 500 ===
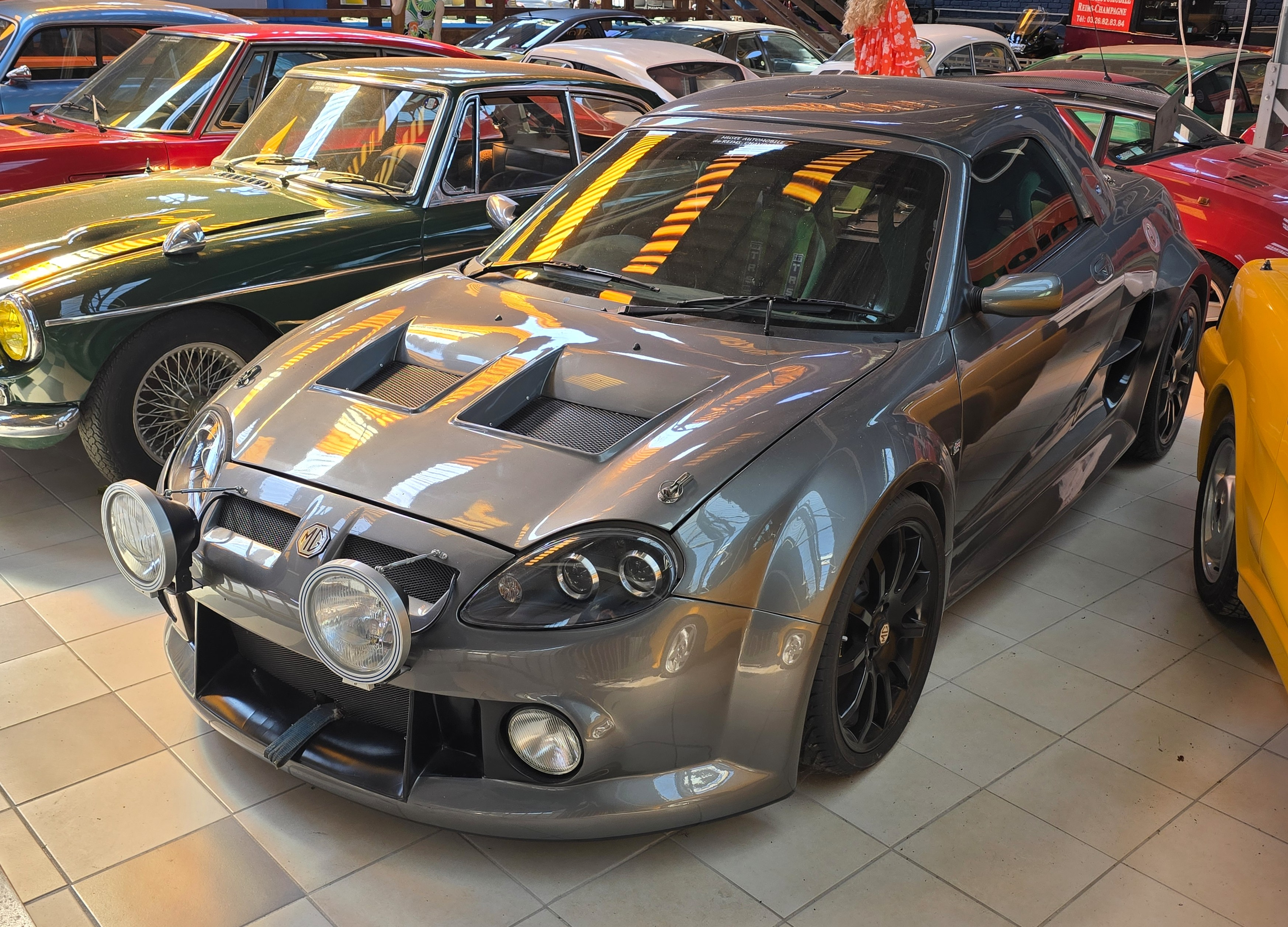
MG XPower 500 concept - on display at the Musee Automobile Reims Champagne in July 2025

Created by the XPower division of the MG Rover Group in 2001 as a one off to show the brand new XPower division and also to show what the engineers could do. The car was designed to accommodate the brand new XP-20 engine used in the MG-Lola EX257 racing car with a Garrett turbocharger with an anti-lag system which achieves 500 metric horsepower (490 bhp; 370 kW). The Power then goes through a six-speed sequential gearbox manufactured by X-Trac.

When built in 2001, the car was equipped with several upgrades over the standard car. It featured a seam-welded bodyshell with a fully-integrated T45 roll cage with strengthened subframes. The chassis comes complete with a limited-slip differential, independent racing suspension and upgraded 4-Pot AP Racing Brakes. The car has 17-inch (43 cm) multi-spoke alloy racing wheels with 225/13 R17 tyres on the front, 265/13 R17 tyres on the rear and a bespoke rear aerofoil.

Initially the XPower concept was designed for a brand new wild version of the MG TF, this never came around however and no concept car for a production XPower TF was created. Reportedly the car was set to feature a de-tuned XP-20 engine used in the XPower 500 concept and the MG-Lola race cars with around 300 metric horsepower (300 bhp; 220 kW) but the idea wasn't developed beyond the planning stage.

=== MG TF GT ===
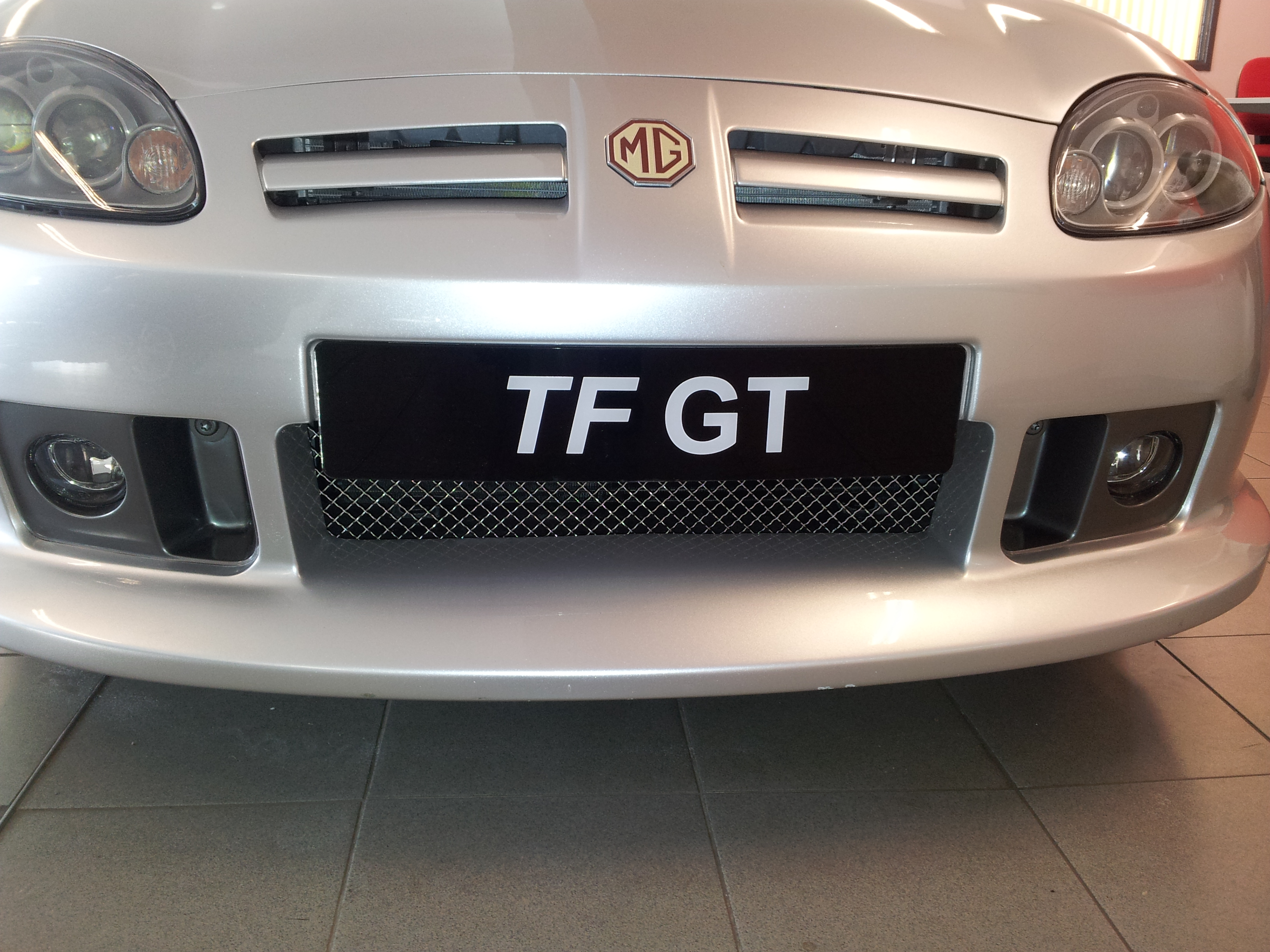
MG TF GT Prototype - on display at Hopton Garage, Staffordshire in August 2012

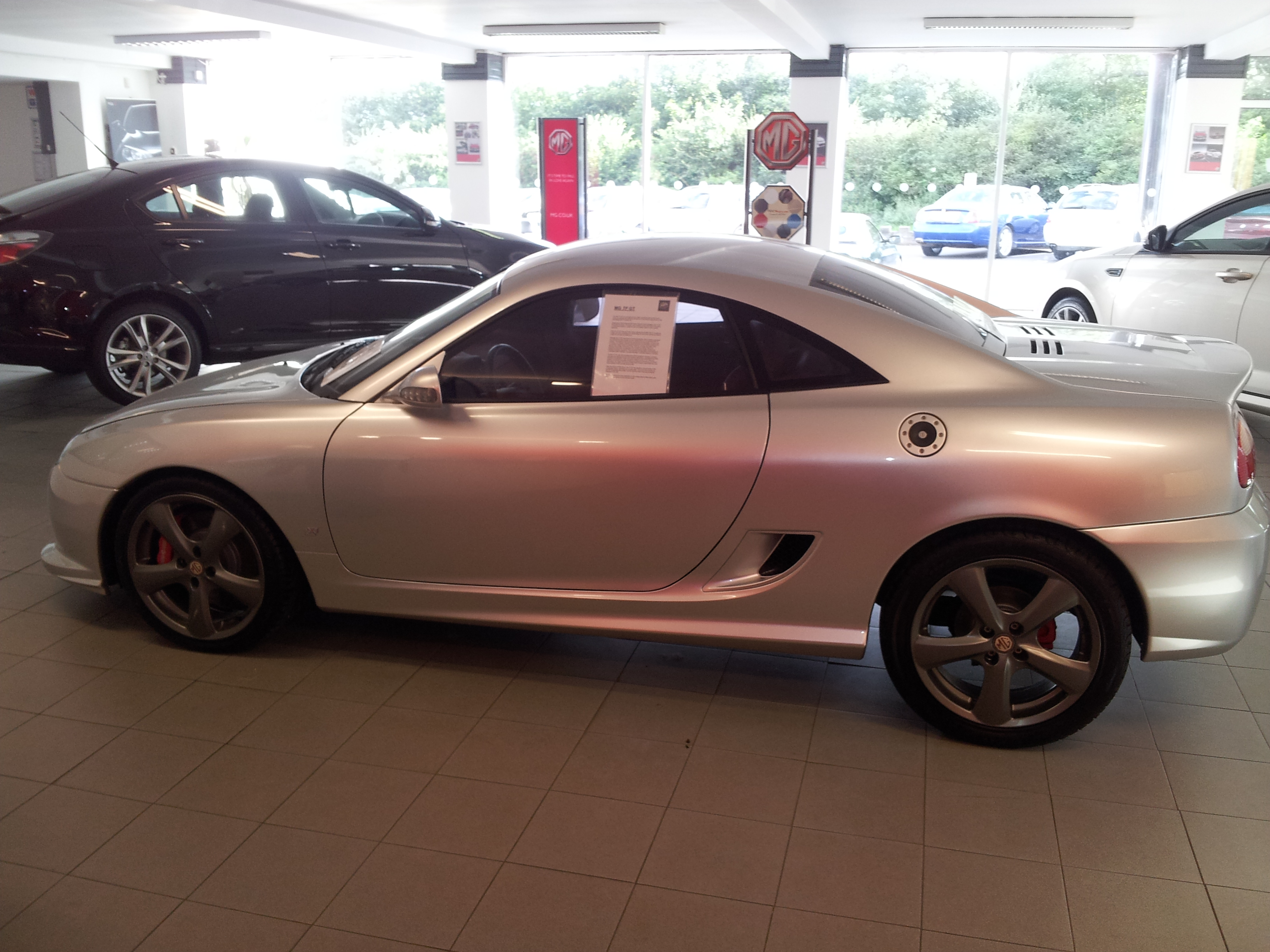
MG TF GT Prototype - side view

Designed in 2005, at Dove in Norfolk by Peter Stevens and his team, at the same time as the Rover 75 Coupé, is the coupe MG TF, called the GT, similar to the Pininfarina designed MGB GT. It was unveiled before MG Rover Group collapsed in April 2005, and was shown at several events such as the AutoRAI in Amsterdam, alongside other cars such as the MG XPower SV.

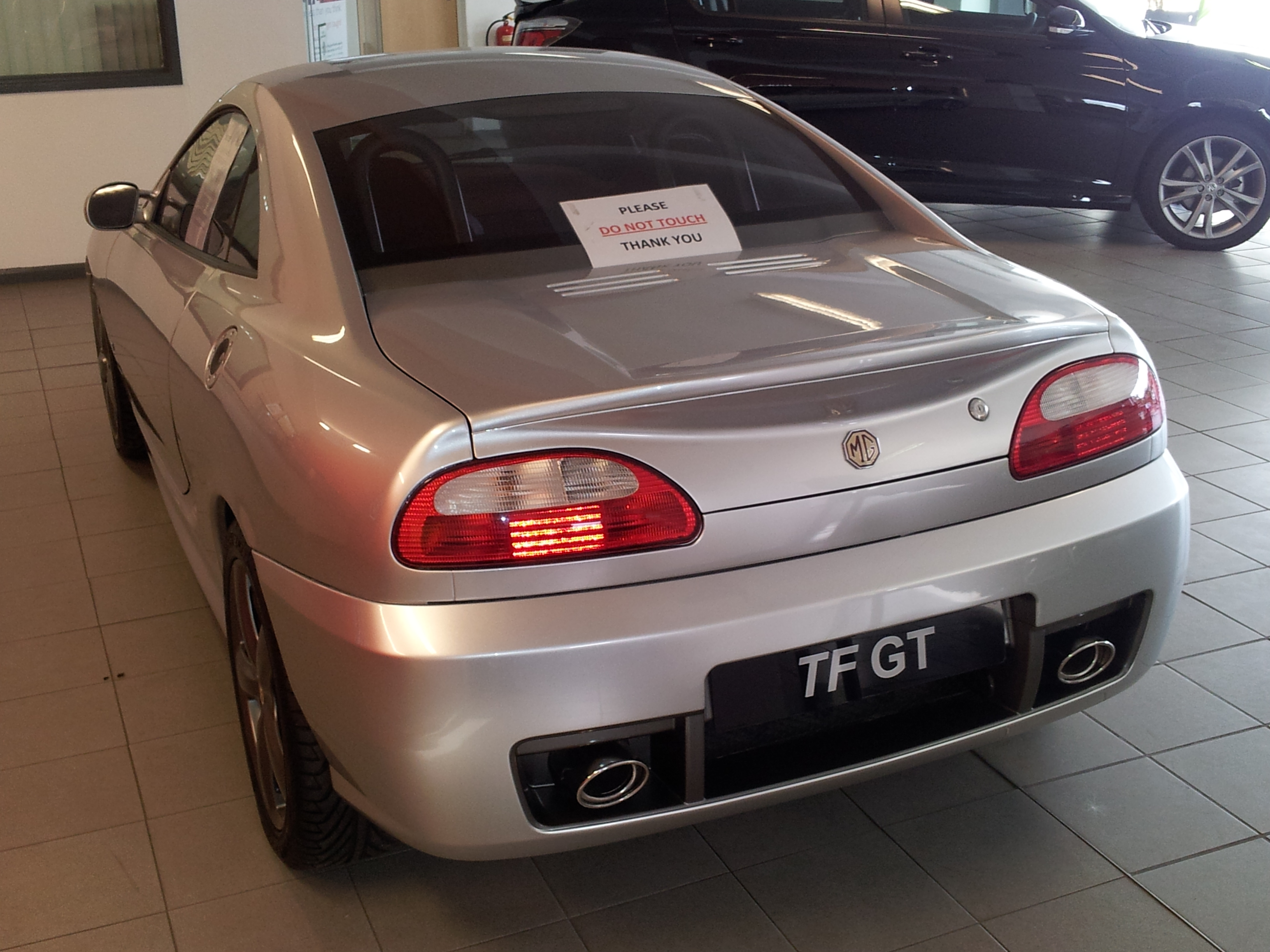
MG TF GT Prototype - rear view

The concept car was developed from a top of the range TF 160, and came with a grenadine interior (a rare option typically in the top of range TF's), brand-new lowered bucket seats, 17" OZ five-spoke wheels, a front splitter to improve aerodynamics and, for the first time in a production/factory TF, a 2.5-litre (150 cu in) Rover KV6 engine. It was reported on forums for MG that the engine was changed to a standard 160 VVC 1.8L K Series sometime in 2005, although this is disputed and is also disputed as to whether the car received a KV6 in the first place.

When launched, the car had several problems. The first of the problems with the coupe was the engine access, which, because the car is a mid rear arrangement posed several problems and made the car hard to work on; it is reported that the subframe had to be removed in order to work on the engine. The second problem is the KV6 powerplant which had to have a bespoke smaller fuel tank to fit in the engine bay as the standard fuel tank wouldn't fit. Although disputed as to whether the car received the KV6 powerplant in the first place it now seems likely however, as ex-MG engineer Chris Flanagan produced his own 2.5 KV6 MGF in 2004 and has subsequently produced further KV6 engined TFs at Retro Sports Cars Ltd in Yorkshire.

Former engineers at MG Rover reported that the car was close to entering production, and as soon as the end of 2005, the car could have been sold. However MG Rover went into receivership, and progress was halted. Nanjing were set to revive the idea and manufacture in the US in a brand new factory in Oklahoma employing 500 people. This idea also never came about with the LE500 and TF135 being the only TF produced by Nanjing at Longbridge, rather than a new purpose built facility in Oklahoma.

== Reception ==
Throughout its production, the MG sold successfully. In a number of road tests, the MG F impressed, and was a match for its main rivals the Mazda MX-5 and BMW Z3 in terms of handling, performance and practicality, but build quality, reliability and dealer support within the United Kingdom were poor in comparison to its Japanese and German rivals.

However, after Nanjing took over and restarted production, the car's sales plummeted, until production was eventually ceased in March 2011.

Parker's gave the car 2.5/5 and said its pros were "Styling, handling and brand heritage" and cons were "Dated interior, patchy build quality and poor reliability."

What Car? gave it 2/5 saying its pros were that it is "pretty and affordable" but its cons were "The driving position and steering are not what you'd expect in such a sporty car."

Auto Express reviewed it after Nanjing took over, and also had a verdict of 2/5, liking how it was "well equipped and compact" but disliking how it was priced more expensive than a basic Mazda MX-5, stating it has "barely changed since 1995, and can be mistaken for a much older vehicle" and also commenting on its cramped interior.

The engine of K Series used in the MG F has gained a reputation for head gasket failure. This is mainly due to the design and placement of the thermostat, however the installation of the head gasket was also a major factor. Other factors include insufficient width between the cylinders, build tolerances, block face stiffness, casting quality, gasket material, and cooling system layout (the engine is at the back and the radiator is at the front).

Due to the placement of the thermostat on the intake side of the water pump at the base of the block the head can overheat before sufficient heat is transmitted through the block to allow the thermostat to open. Thermal shock from cooling the block rapidly and the thermostat closing abruptly due to cold water from the radiator cooling the opening spring can result in insufficient coolant reaching as far as the head, which can cause different expansion and contraction rates between the head and the block.

This combined with the early practice of installing the head gasket with plastic locating dowels, which subsequently melted when the engines overheated, allowed the head gaskets to "walk." A redesigned head gasket, which consists of a multiple layer metal gasket or "MLS" used in conjunction with steel locating dowels, is alleged to significantly reduce the chance of a head gasket failure.

There is no other replacement engine that is a suitable substitute for the K Series. Apart from the head gasket problem, however, MGF and TF models are said to have few major faults.

The K Series engine was identical to that found in other Rover vehicles, and was originally intended for mainstream saloon and hatchback models. The design compromise of locating the thermostat on the pump intake, rather than the head outlet, stems from this original use. A common aftermarket modification is to install an Inline thermostat in the outlet pipe from the head to the radiator, with some owners reporting reliability increases. This head gasket problem is also found on K Series-engined Lotus Elise models and is also commonly solved by thermostat relocation.
