= Caterham 7 =

British super-lightweight sports car

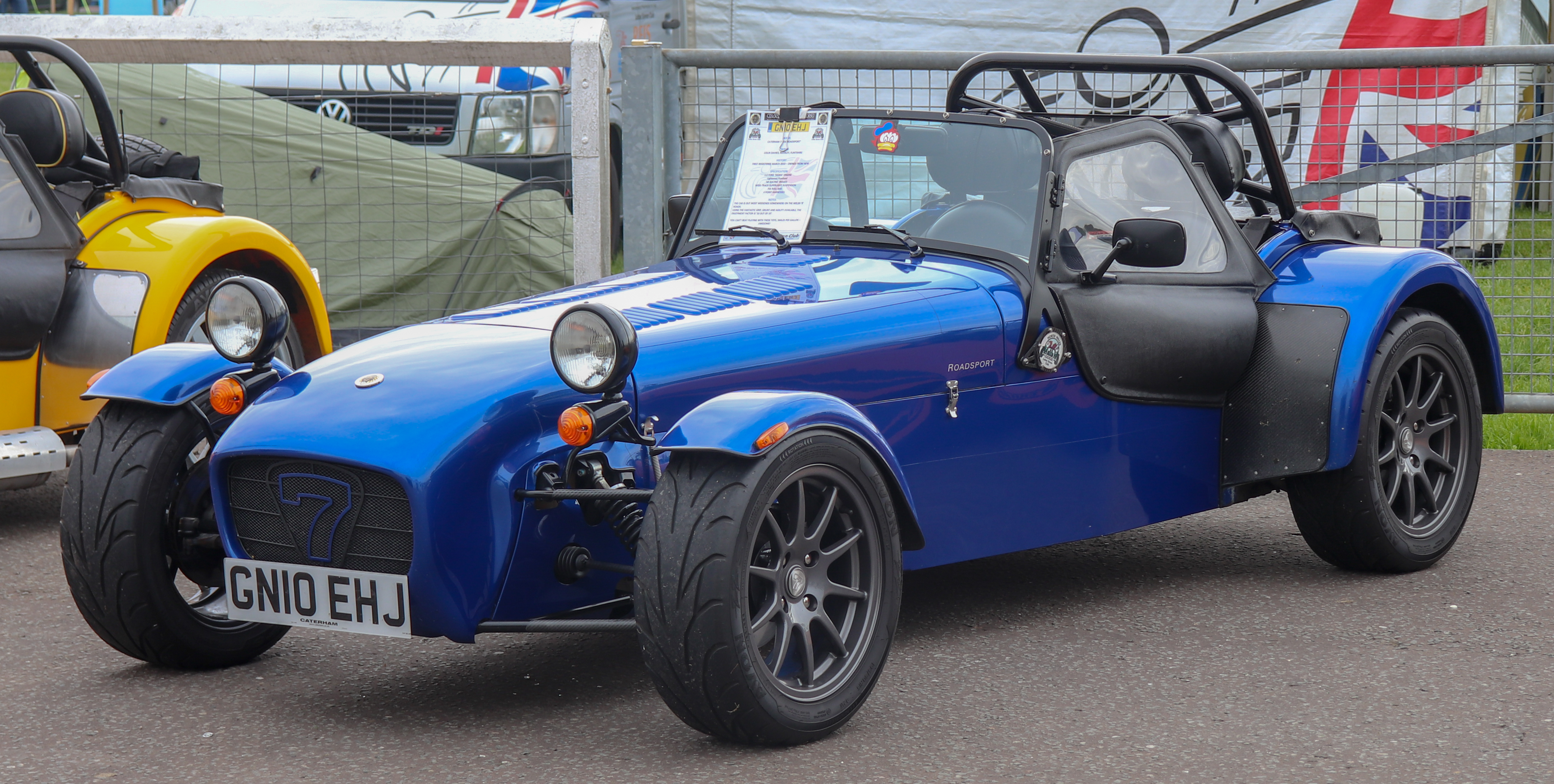
- Caterham 7 Roadsport 175

Overview
- Manufacturer: Caterham Cars
- Production: 1973–present
- Assembly: United Kingdom: Dartford

Body and chassis
- Class: Sports car
- Body style: Open two seat
- Layout: Longitudinal front-engine, rear-wheel drive

Powertrain
- Engine: 0.7 L Suzuki K6A I3 (Seven 160/165); 0.7 L Suzuki R06A turbo I3 (Seven 170); 1.4–1.8 L Rover K-Series I4; 1.6 L Lotus-Ford Twin Cam Cosworth BDR I4 (Seven DBR 1600); 1.6 L Ford-Kent I4; 1.6 L Ford Sigma TI-VCT I4 (Seven 270); 2.0 L Vauxhall twin-cam I4 (JPE); 2.0 L Vauxhall twin-cam turbo I4 (S7 Competition R); 2.0 L Ford Duratec I4 (Seven 360/420); 2.0 L Caterham Duratec I4 (Superlight); 2.0 L Caterham-Ford Sigma I4 (Supersport); 2.0 L Ford Duratec supercharged I4 (Seven 620); 2.4 L Roush RST-V8 supercharged V8 (Seven RST-V8)
- Transmission: 5-speed manual 6-speed manual 6-speed sequential manual

Dimensions
- Kerb weight: 545 kg (1,202 lb)

Chronology
- Predecessor: Lotus Seven
- Successor: Caterham 7 CSR (for Caterham 7 SV)

The Caterham 7 (or Caterham Seven) is a super-lightweight sports car produced by Caterham Cars in the United Kingdom. It is based on the Lotus Seven, a lightweight sports car sold in kit and factory-built form by Lotus Cars, from 1957 to 1972.

After Lotus ended production of the Lotus Seven, Caterham bought the rights to the design, and today make both kits and fully assembled cars. The modern Caterham Seven is based on the Series 3 Lotus Seven, though developed to the point that no part is the same as on the original Lotus.

Various other manufacturers offer a sports car in a similar basic configuration, but Caterham owns various legal rights to the Lotus Seven design and name. The company has taken legal action in the past in order to protect those rights, although in South Africa, it lost its case against Birkin on the basis that it never obtained the claimed rights from Lotus.

== History ==
Colin Chapman had been a Royal Air Force pilot, studied structural engineering, and went on to become a innovator in motorsports design. He founded Lotus Engineering Ltd. His expertise on light, powerful cars and performance suspensions guided much of his development work with the basic design philosophy of, "Simplify, then add lightness". His Lotus 7 had its debut at the 1957 Earl's Court Motor Show in London. They were priced at £1,036 including purchase tax but it cost £536 in kit form as no purchase tax was required. It weighed 725 lb (329 kg). Fast and responsive, the Lotus 7 was one of Chapman's masterworks, an advanced machine that surpassed the earlier Lotus 6 as a vehicle that could perform well on the track and be driven legally on the road.

In 1973, Lotus decided to shed its kit car image and concentrate on limited series motor racing cars and up-market sports cars. As part of this plan, it sold the rights to the Seven to its only remaining agents, Caterham Cars in England and Steel Brothers Limited in New Zealand. At the time the current production car was the Series 4, but when Caterham ran out of the Lotus Series 4 kits in 1974 they introduced its own version of the Series 3, as the Caterham Seven. The modern-day Road sports and Superlights (in "narrow-bodied chassis" form) are the direct descendants of this car and therefore of the original Lotus 7.

=== Chassis and suspension ===
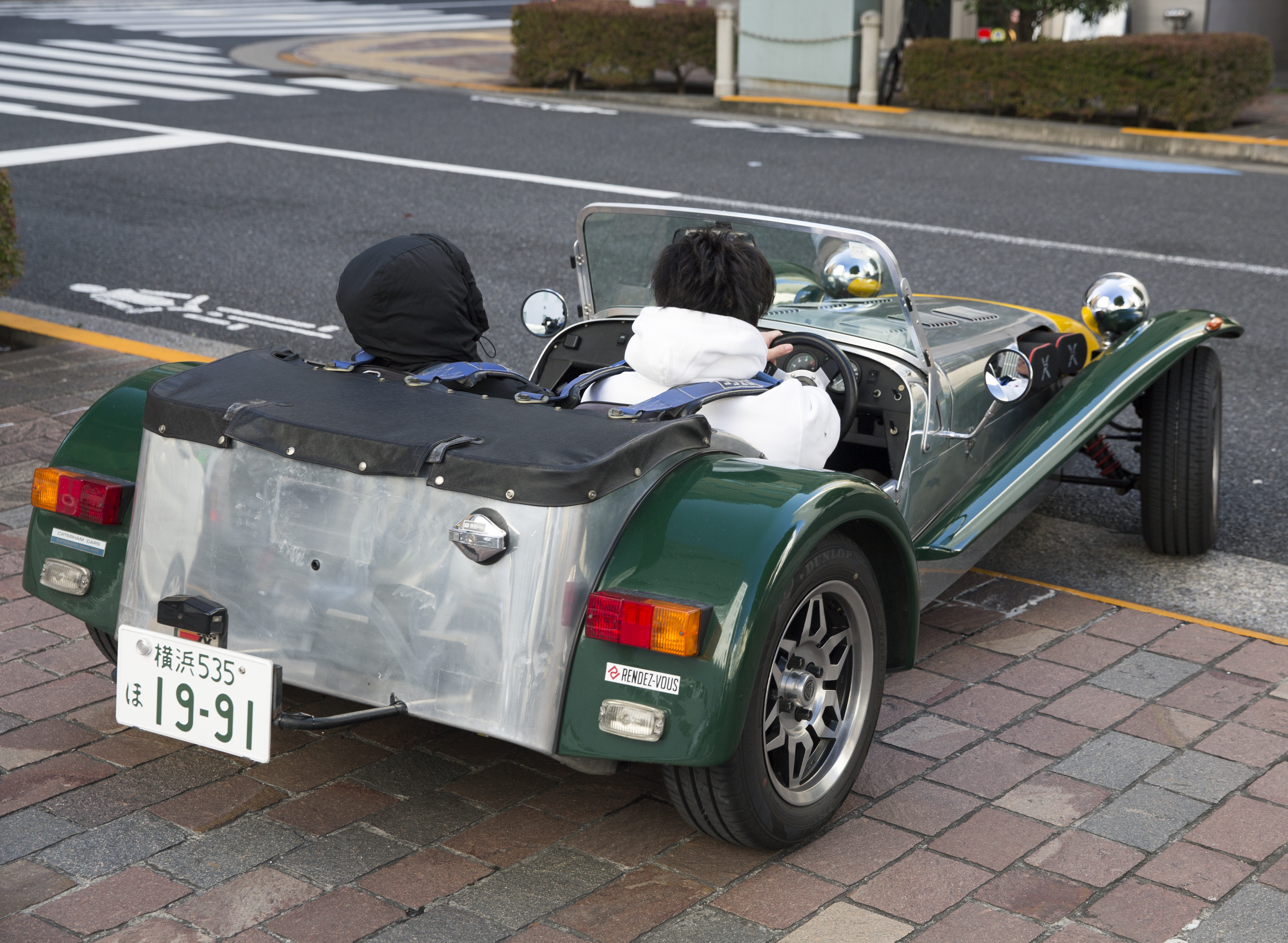
Rear view (1700 Super Sprint; 1991)

As with the Lotus Mark VI before it, the original Lotus Seven used an extremely light space-frame chassis with stressed aluminium body panels. Although the chassis has had numerous modifications to strengthen it and accommodate the various engine and suspension setups (and to try to find more cockpit space for the occupants), this basic formula has remained essentially the same throughout the Seven's life (with the exception of the Series 4, which used steel for the cockpit and engine bay and glassfibre for the bodywork). Early cars used a live rear axle, initially from various Fords, later from the Morris Ital. De Dion rear suspension was introduced in the mid-1980s and both geometries were on offer until 2002 when the live-axle option was phased out (though later reintroduced for the 160/165 and 170/Super Seven 600 versions). Late 90s and early 2000s versions (such as the Superlight) employed adjustable double-wishbone suspension with front anti-roll bar and a de-Dion rear axle, located by an A-frame and Watt's linkage.

The Caterham 7 range was based exclusively on this Series 3 chassis until 2000, when the SV (Series V, or Special Vehicle) chassis was released, aimed at accommodating the increasing number of prospective buyers who could not fit comfortably in the Series 3 cockpit. The SV chassis offers an extra 110 mm (4.3 in) of width across the cockpit, at a cost of 25 kg (55 lb) of extra weight, and both chassis sizes are available today in earlier Superlight and current 360, 420, 620 and Super Seven 2000 configurations, though only the S3 chassis is offered on the 170 and Super Seven 600.

The SV chassis subsequently provided the basic dimensions for the Caterham CSR. The suspension was completely redesigned, bringing the front suspension inboard, using pushrods, and replacing the De-Dion rear axle with a lighter, fully independent, double-wishbone layout with new coil/damper units. Additional chassis modifications resulted in a 25% increase in torsional stiffness. The CSR was released in October 2004, with a Cosworth Duratec engine and was available from the factory in either 200 bhp (149 kW) or 260 bhp (194 kW) form.

=== Engines ===
==== Lotus TwinCam ====
Early cars used the Lotus TwinCam engine (subsequently manufactured by Vegantune), followed by Ford Crossflow engines. In 1977 it was announced that Caterham Cars had taken over the rights to build and develop the Twin Cam engine. Caterham also had the big-valve version (with twin Dell'Orto carburettors) emissions tested and obtained a certificate of compliance. In the end, Caterham had engine tuners Vegantune build the engines, using reconditioned twin cam heads, to supply the very important Japanese market. Caterham also had Vegantune develop a version of the Twin Cam using Ford's 1598-cc block (rather than basing it on the earlier 1498 cc unit) with their own, improved DOHC cylinder head. Called the VTA, this variant launched in 1983. Supplied to Caterham Cars as a replacement for the Twin Cam in the Caterham Seven, the VTA featured belt-driven cams. The engine used the later Crossflow block and displaced 1.6 or 1.7 litres. Power was 140 to 160 hp (104 to 119 kW). Around 40 units were supplied to Caterham but quality control was very uneven and Caterham eventually switched over to the Cosworth BDR engine or the single-cam 1700 Supersprint. The first Cosworth BDR-engined Sevens appeared around 1983, in 1600 cc 140 bhp (104 kW) form, followed by 1700 cc 150 bhp (112 kW) versions three years later.

==== Vauxhall ====
By 1990 the top of the range engine had become the two-litre Vauxhall HPC, as fitted to the Vauxhall Calibra, producing 165–175 bhp. A few HPC "Evolution" models were built with engines developed by Swindon Race Engines producing between 218 bhp (163 kW) and 235 bhp (175 kW). In 1993 Caterham created the JPE special edition (named for Formula 1 driver Jonathan Palmer) by using a two-litre Vauxhall Touring Car engine, producing around 250 bhp (186 kW) and reducing weight to around 530 kg (1,168 lb) by such measures as removing the windscreen in favour of an aeroscreen. The JPE was quoted at 0–60 mph times of around 3.5 seconds and, with Jonathan Palmer at the wheel, set a 0–100 mph-0 record of 12.6 seconds. Around 1997 the cross flow range was replaced by 8v and 16v Vauxhall units which, in various guises lived on until the end of the VX-powered Caterham Classic, in 2002.

==== Rover ====
The Rover K-series made its appearance in 1991, initially as the 1.4-litre engine from the Metro GTi. This engine became the backbone of the range for the next 15 years. The 1.6-litre K-series appeared in 1996 and the 1.8-litre a year later. 1996 also saw the addition of the 'Superlight' range, a range that successfully focussed initially on reducing weight and subsequently on the bespoke tuning of the K-series to ever-higher outputs. Weight was saved by removing the spare wheel (and carrier), carpets, heater, and often the windscreen (replaced with an aeroscreen), hood, and doors. Lightweight "Tillet" GRP seats were usually fitted along with carbon-fibre front wings and nosecone (note however that items such as heaters and windscreens could still be specified by the Superlight customer if they so wanted). The wide-track suspension was added to the superlight, increasing the track at the front to match that at the back. The later Superlight-R offered the dry-sumped VHPD (Very High-Performance Derivative) variant on the 1.8-litre K-series. Output was now up to around 180 bhp (134 kW), in a car that now weighed as little as 490 kg (1,080 lb).

Three years later Caterham took the same concept to a new level and created the iconic Superlight R500, still based on the Rover 1.8-litre K-series but now tuned (by Minister Racing Engines) to around 230 bhp (172 kW) at 8,600 rpm in a car weighing just 460 kg (1,014 lb). The R500 was initially available in kit-form but quickly became a factory-build only item. Quoted performance figures are; 0–100 mph in 8.2 seconds (although EVO magazine quotes 8.8 seconds). The engine required frequent "refreshing" in order to keep it on the road and a series of engine revisions were undertaken throughout the R500's life in order to increase reliability. This culminated in 2004 with perhaps the most extreme production Caterham of all; the R500 EVO was bored out by Minister to 1,998 cc and delivered 250 bhp (186 kW). At £42,000, the R500 EVO sold poorly; it is believed that just three were sold. It did, however, succeed in setting a series of performance car benchmarks several of which last to this day; the 0–100 mph-0 record was set at 10.73 seconds (in second place was a Ferrari Enzo costing ten times as much) and, until the end of 2006 it remained the fastest production car timed by EVO magazine around the Bedford Autodrome West Circuit, ahead of a Porsche Carrera GT. Only the Radical SR3 1300 has subsequently posted a faster time than the R500 EVO.

==== Ford ====
After the demise of Rover and Powertrain, Caterham started the process of phasing out the Rover K-series engine and replacing them with Ford engines; the Sigma engine for Road sports and later 270 and 310 models, and the 2.0-litre and 2.3-litre Duratec engines for the more powerful Superlight, CSR, 360, 420, 620 and Super Seven 2000 ranges.

In 2013, the 620R had installed a Ford Duratec direct injection 2.0-litre (1,999 cc) supercharged straight-four engine rated at 315 PS (311 bhp; 232 kW) at 7700 rpm and 297 N⋅m (219 lb⋅ft) at 7350 rpm of torque.

==== Suzuki-engined models ====
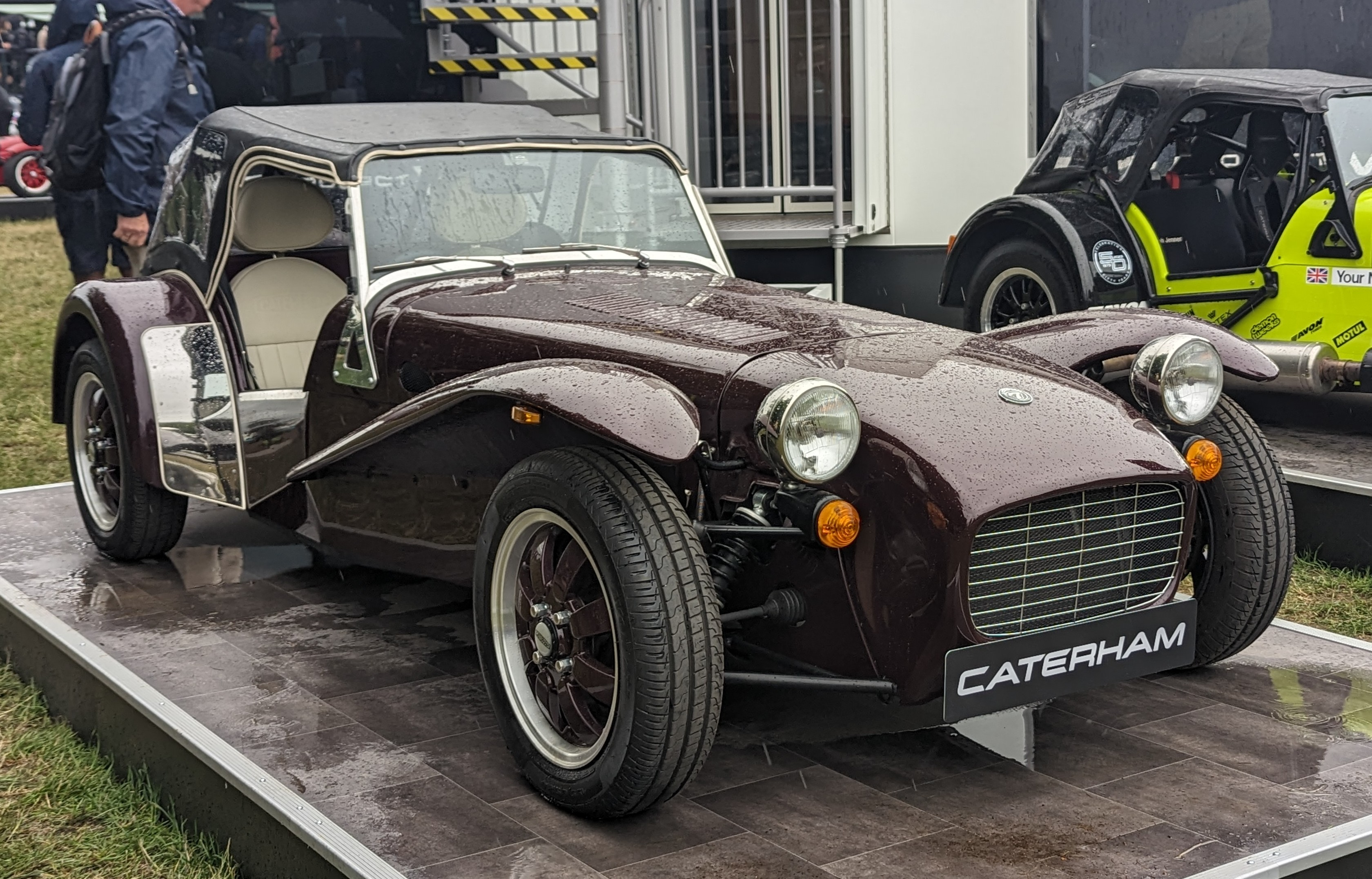
Seven 600 at Goodwood in 2023.

In 2013, Caterham also launched the 160/165 at the opposite end of the spectrum. This used a Suzuki 660 cc three-cylinder turbo K6A engine, producing 80 hp (60 kW; 81 PS), with S3-style body work only. The live rear axle and transmission were borrowed from the Suzuki Jimny. The model was only available in S (road) specification and continued until 2018. UK examples (160) have a full windshield; European export models (165) were only equipped with a small "aero screen" as the windshield frame did not meet EU field of vision requirements. When European pollution and fuel consumption guidelines testing were changed to WLTP (from the earlier NEDC) in September 2018, the 165 and the 355 both had to be discontinued in mainland Europe as Caterham was unable to meet the new requirements.

The 160 was replaced in 2021 by the 170, available in both R (track) and S (road) specifications. The 170 uses a newer Suzuki 660 cc three cylinder turbo R06A engine, producing 84 hp (62 kW); this car meets the WLTP testing requirements and is available to the same specifications in continental Europe as well as the United Kingdom. The 170 features narrower front and rear bodywork resulting in the smallest Seven Caterham have produced, and the lightest of the current range, weighing in at 440 kg (970 lb) in R specification. Again, this variant is only available in the S3 body. In 2022 a further variant, the Super Seven 600, was added: this features the same engine and chassis, but with more traditional clamshell front wings and a variety of other heritage styling changes.

==== Motorcycle-engined models ====
Caterham has had a somewhat tentative relationship with the installation of motorbike engines into their cars. Since 2000, a Canadian firm has been selling Caterham 7 models using the GSX1300R engine used in the Suzuki Hayabusa. It reportedly does 0–62 in under 3 seconds. In 2000 the Honda CBR1100 engine was installed into a 430 kg (948 lb) superlight chassis to create the Caterham Blackbird, delivering 170 bhp (127 kW) at 10,750 rpm, albeit with no more than 92 lb⋅ft (125 N⋅m) of maximum torque. The Blackbird offered near R500 performance for rather less money (Top Gear quoted 0–60 of 3.7 seconds and a top speed of 143 mph (230 km/h) at a new cost of £25,750). In 2001 a Honda Fireblade engine was offered in a live-axle chassis, via James Whiting of Ashford, Middlesex. Quoted power was 128 bhp (95 kW) at 10,500 rpm. Both of these models have since ceased production.

There has also been at least one installation of the RST-V8, created by Moto Power; a 2-litre, 40 valve 340 bhp (254 kW) V8 made from a pair of motorcycle engines joined at the crank. An early, pre-production review of the car/engine combination exists on the EVO website. In Feb 2008, the "Caterham 7 Levante" was announced, featuring a supercharged version the RST-V8, offering over 500 bhp (370 kW), installed in a modified Caterham chassis, with bespoke bodywork. Made by RS Performance (described in the press release as "Caterham's new performance arm"), the Levante is intended to be a limited run of 8 cars at a cost of £115,000 each.

== Racing ==
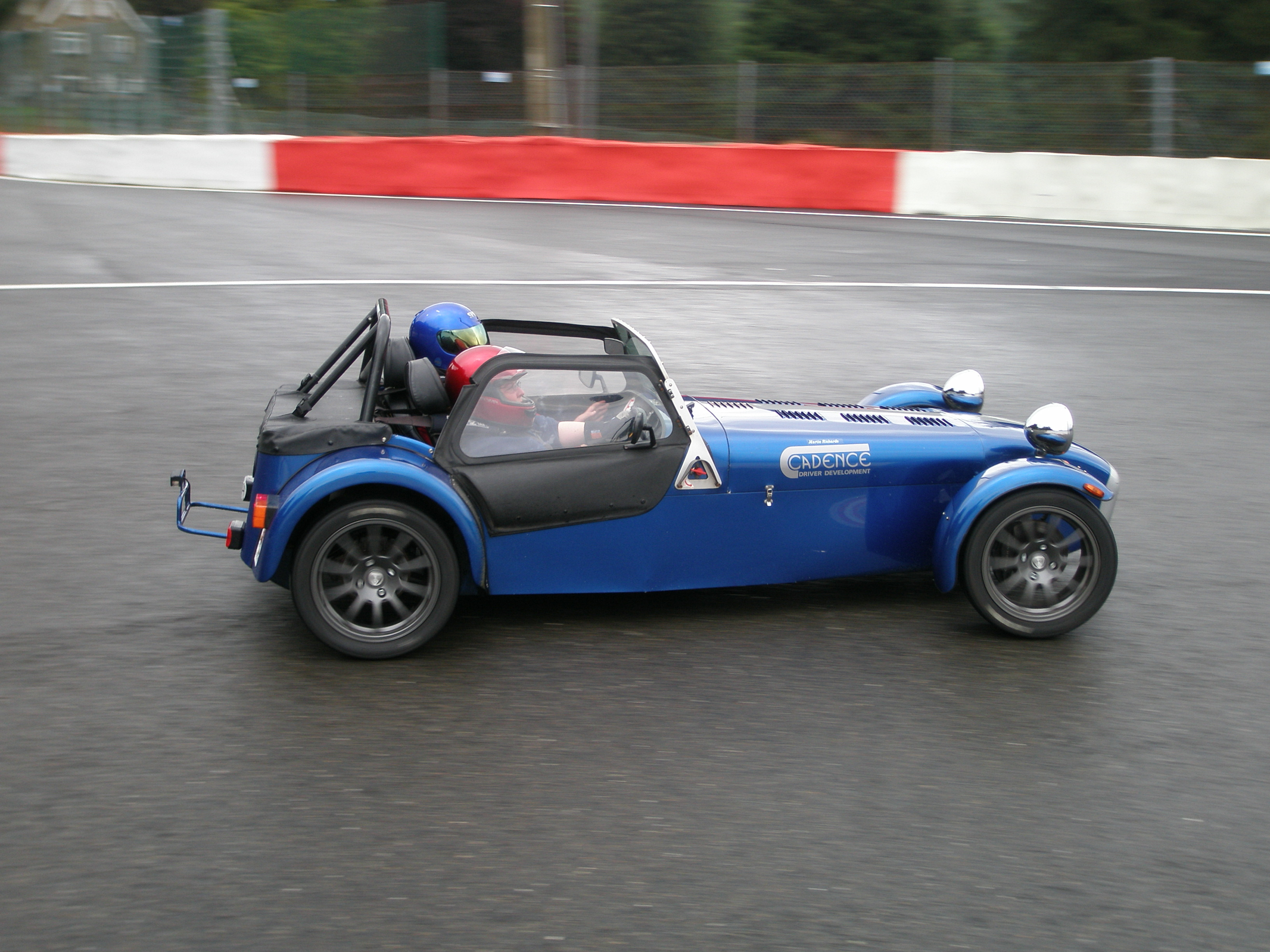
Caterham 7 on track at Spa-Francorchamps

The Lotus 7 was conceived by Chapman as a car to be raced. Whilst still a prototype, in September 1957, it was raced at the Brighton Speed Trials and by the end of 1958 Graham Hill was winning races with the Coventry Climax-engined 'Super Seven'. The car has had a strong racing history throughout its life under both Lotus and Caterham stewardship. Amongst the marque's more famous races was the victory in the Nelson Ledges 24-hour race in Ohio when, against a field including works teams from Honda and Mazda, a four-man team from Caterham (including both Jez Coates and Robert Nearn) won by seven laps (after 990 laps) in a modified Vauxhall HPC.

After dominating open class races for decades, Caterham Super 7 Racing, a one-make championship for Caterhams, began in 1986. Caterham 7 races have since expanded to include club and competitive races in the United Kingdom, continental Europe, Canada, the United States and Asia. In 1995 the Caterham Academy, a novices-only format, was introduced in the UK. For £17,995 (2009 price), entrants get a modified Roadsport kit (although a factory-built option is available for extra cost) with a sealed 120 bhp (89 kW) engine and 5-speed gearbox. Having completed the ARDS license qualification, the season then consists of four sprints followed by four circuit races. The academy is designed as the first step in a well-established chain of Caterham race formats, such as the Caterham Motorsport Ladder which consists of Road sports B then Road sports A, R300, Superlight and Eurocup, or the Caterham Graduates Racing Club.

The car was banned from production car racing in the UK in 1976 for being too successful. This prompted Caterham Cars' boss Graham Nearn to produce T-shirts which read "Caterham Seven, the car that's Too Fast to Race ...". More significantly, Nearn also reached out to his local MP, Sir Geoffrey Howe, arguing that it was unreasonable to ban a British product from a British championship. The RAC lifted the ban in 1980, but initially only allowed Caterhams to be raced under rather severe restrictions, requiring a full windshield be fitted and limiting the engine to the 84 hp (63 kW) Crossflow unit. These restrictions were later gradually lifted. In 2002 an R400 won its class (and came 11th overall out of 200 starters) at the Nürburgring 24-hour race by 10 laps, ahead of the competition that included Porsche and BMW racecars, leading, once again, to a ban on entry in subsequent years.

== Current range ==
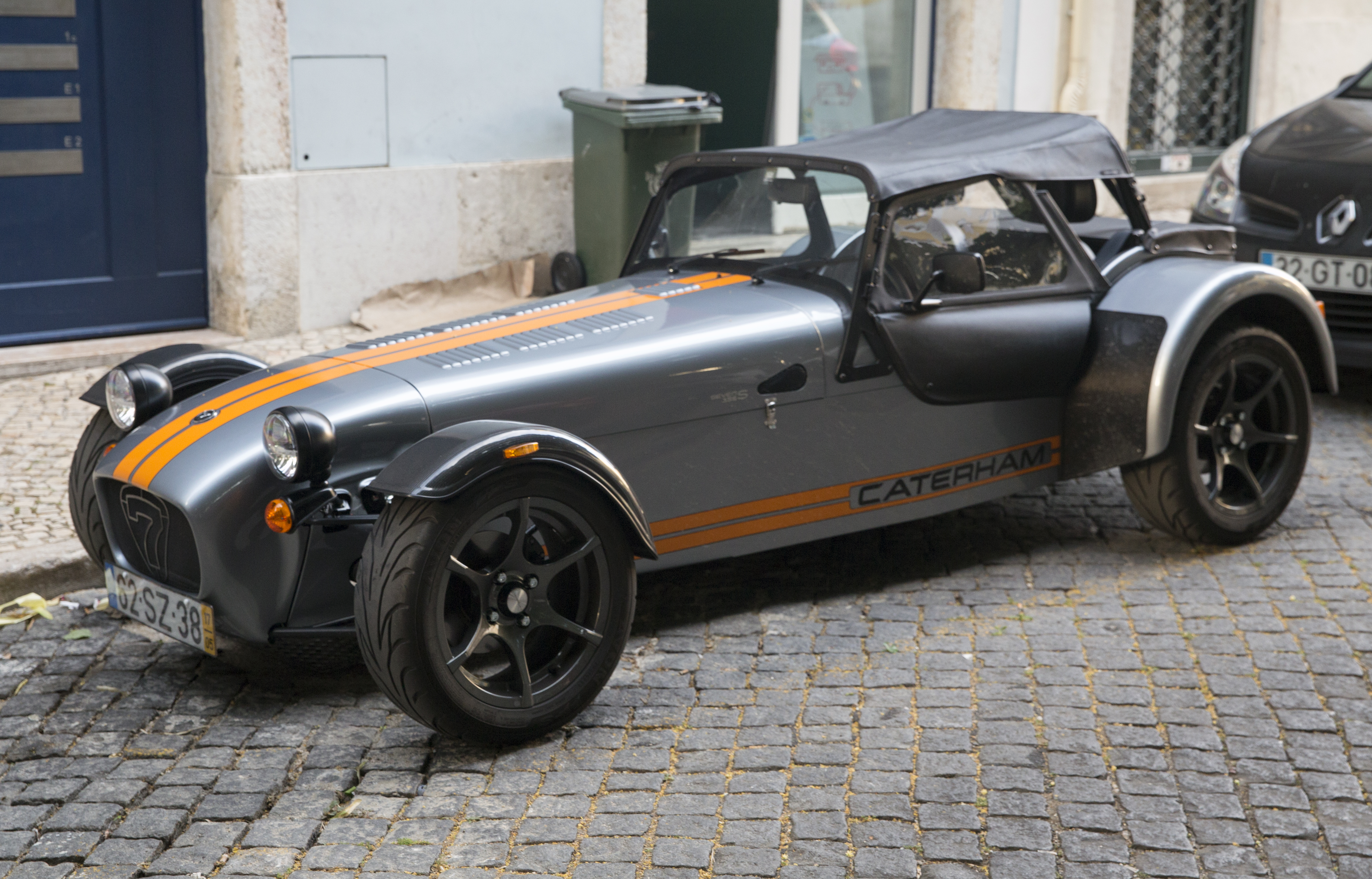
2017 Caterham Seven 355S (Portugal)

The existing range provided by Caterham Cars comprises a choice of two chassis types (the traditional narrow-bodied 'Series 3' chassis and a wider 'Series 5'). All road going Caterham 7s are powered by a 2.0 Ford Duratec engine except the 170, the Caterham academy cars are powered by a 1.6 Ford Sigma engine. All models are available either factory-built or as a self-build kit (620 factory built only).

Until mid-2013, the factory had offered options around the Rover K-series engine, including the entry-level "Classic" with a 1.4-litre, capable of 0–60 in 6.5 seconds and a top speed of 110 mph (180 km/h). But with the cessation of the engine production and new EU emissions regulations, the end of the engine's production also removed the "Classic" from the company's model line-up. As of 2017, the company maintains two separate ranges for mainland Europe (Euro 6 compliant) and the United Kingdom, reflecting the different legislative systems.

As of 2015, the range was simplified and is now simply a number, reflecting the horsepower per tonne, with 'S' or 'R' packages for either street or track use. Most versions (not the 170) are available on the standard S3 or on the wider SV chassis. The European models end with the number "5" while the UK models end in a "0". Until September 2018, when European pollution and fuel consumption guidelines testing were changed to WLTP from the earlier NEDC, the European range consisted of the Seven 165, 275, 355, and 485. The 165 and 355 were both discontinued in September 2018, leaving only the 275 and 485. The UK range for 2022 is 170, 360, 420, and 620; the 170 model (once again available in Europe as well) is powered by a 660-cc Suzuki engine, while the more powerful variants have 2.0-litre Ford engines.

=== 170 ===
The 170 is the current entry-level offering from Caterham. Prior to 2021, entry-level models were the K6A-engined 160 and 165: the 160 for the United Kingdom and the 165 intended for sale in the European Union. It is only available with the S3 chassis, doors, and windscreen as standard. There is a list of optional extras such as carpets, spare wheel, weather package, and heater. The 170 is powered by a turbocharged Suzuki 660 cc kei car R06A engine producing 84 horsepower. The price starts at £22,990 for a 170S in semi-kit form. This model, with its skinnier tyres and Suzuki driveshafts, is compact enough to be classified as a Kei car in Japan – even though its power which is above the 64 PS limit for that class, as its European Type Approval was more important to the Japanese authorities. Caterham Japan had originally intended to sell the car with the lower powered engine, assuming this was required, and initially announced the car as the "Caterham 130" in November 2013, reflecting the lower power-to-weight ratio.

The car's gearbox and live rear axle is also supplied by Suzuki, with the rear axle coming from the Suzuki Every kei van; this is the first Caterham with a live rear axle since the supply of Morris Marina rears dried up and the Seven Beaulieu ended production in 2003. The car received a large amount of publicity for a low-powered entry-level model, with an appearance on Top Gear, and Suzuki displaying it at the 2014 Frankfurt Motor Show. Production had to be adjusted upwards by 50 percent, with a third of the first year's production of 150 cars being shipped to Japan.

=== 360 ===
The 360 is now the second-level offering from Caterham. It is available in both S3 and SV chassis sizes and is sold in kit form as standard. The 360 is available in both 'S' and 'R' trims for street and track respectively. The 360 has 180 bhp (134 kW), produced from a 2.0 Ford Duratec engine. 0-60 mph time is 4.8 seconds, going on to a top speed of 130 mph (209 km/h). Until September 2018, when testing requirements were changed, Continental European buyers could buy a version of this. The EU model was called the 355, reflecting the somewhat lower power-to-weight ratio of the export model's 175 metric horsepower (129 kW; 173 hp).

=== 420 ===
The 420 is currently the mid-range Caterham Seven, producing 210 hp from its 2.0 Ford Duratec engine. It is available in both S3 and SV chassis and comes in kit form as standadrd but you can opt to have it built by Caterham. The 420 is available in either 'S' or 'R' trim options for street or track use. The 420 starts at £42,390.

==== 420 Cup ====
The 420 is also available as the 420 Cup. This is a much more track oriented option, although still street legal. It comes as standard with a six speed sequential Sadev gearbox, custom adjustable rate Bilstein dampers and race harnesses. The 420 Cup starts at £56,490.

=== 620 ===
The Seven 620 is currently the top of the Seven range in terms of performance. With a 2.0 supercharged Ford Duratec engine and a six speed sequential gearbox, producing 310 hp and a 0-60 time of 2.79s. The 620 is only available as a factory built car. It is available in both S3 and SV chassis sizes. Pricing starts at £58,490.

=== CSR 20 ===
The CSR 20 is a commemoration of 20 years of the CSR. The CSR is based on an SV chassis but featuring inboard pushrod front suspension and double wishbone rear suspension replacing the normal De Dion tube found on the more standard Seven chassis. Caterham are only producing 20 of these commemorative models. This model comes standard with carbon front wings, uniquely embroiderd seats and tunnel top and a satin carbon dashboard. The CSR Twenty starts at £79,995.

=== Superlight ===
The Superlight is available in both S3 and SV chassis sizes. The list of standard equipment reflects the Superlight's bias to track work: Wide-track front suspension, 6-speed sequential manual gearbox, carbon-fibre dashboard and front wings, GRP aeroscreen, and seats, racing harness, removable steering wheel. Quoted weight for the Superlight is about 50 kg (110 lb) less than the Roadsport, due in part to the lack of a spare wheel and carrier. All Superlight cars use the 2-litre Ford Duratec engine in differing states of tune; the R400 with 210 bhp (157 kW) and R500 with 263 bhp (196 kW). Caterham used to manufacture an R300 using the same engine at 175 bhp, but this car has effectively now become the Supersport R. With the launch of the R500 (April 2008), Caterham made available the options of a sequential gearbox and launch control. Quoted performance for the R500 is 0–60 in 2.88 seconds and a top speed of 150 mph (241 km/h). In October 2012 a supercharged model 'R600' for a race-series above the R300-class was released, including slick tyres and a sequential gearbox. The weight of the R600 was 1,139 lb (517 kg).

At the beginning of December 2008, Top Gear made the R500 its '2008 Car of the Year'.

=== Super Seven ===
The Super Seven is a series of retro-inspired Caterhams. Caterham has designed the Super Seven to have long, flared wheel arches, dials provided by Smiths, and a wire mesh grille. Optional packages include a wooden Mota-Lita steering wheel to complete the look.

==== Super Seven 1600 ====
Announced in 2020, the Super Seven 1600 was the first in this line of retro styled Sevens. It is powered by a 1.6-litre Ford Sigma petrol engine which makes use of twin throttle bodies to aid airflow. This model was discontinued in 2022, when the Sigma engine was no longer available from Ford.

==== Super Seven 600 ====
Announced in 2022, this retro inspired model is powered by a 660 cc Suzuki R06A kei engine and live axle, the same as in the Seven 170 model.

==== Super Seven 2000 ====
Announced alongside the 600, this model features a 2.0L Ford Duratec engine producing 180 hp and a 0-60 time of 4.8s.

=== EV ===
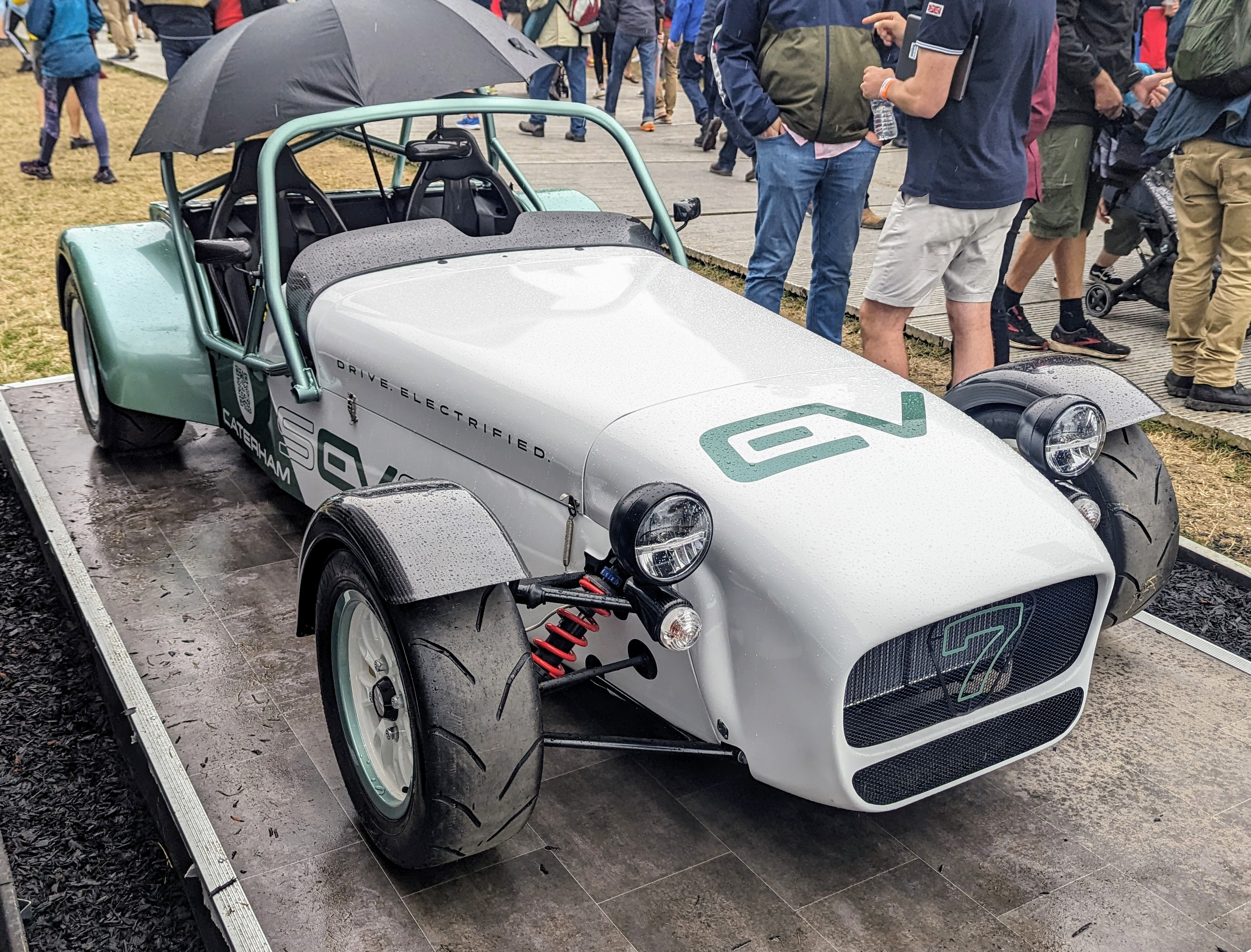
Seven EV electric prototype at Goodwood Festival of Speed in 2023

Two Seven EV concepts were shown at Goodwood Festival of Speed in July 2023. These had electric motors from Swindon Powertrain E-axle and weighed 70 kg more due to the 40 kWh battery.

== Model history ==
=== 50th Anniversary editions ===
Caterham celebrated the 50th year of Seven productions with a couple of special edition "50th Anniversary" paint options. In addition, as part of the 50th-anniversary celebrations in early June 2007, they showcased the X330 concept car. Based on the CSR, the X330 employs a supercharged version of the Duratec engine to produce 330 bhp (246 kW). The use of lighter-gauge steel and of carbon-fibre instead of GRP further improves the power-to-weight ratio. Caterham says that they have no plans to put this car into production.

=== CSR ===
The CSR represents the top of the range and in some respects can be considered a separate model. It has its own chassis, suspension, and interior and is available with 2.3-litre (200 bhp or 260 bhp) Ford Cosworth Duratec engine. Quoted performance for the CSR260 is 0–60 in 3.1 seconds and a top speed of 155 mph (249 km/h). There is no home-build option; the factory supplies the finished car.

In 2006, Caterham introduced the CSR Superlight. Based on the CSR260, this model adds a 'Superlight' lightweight specification to the CSR, further extending the CSR260's already epic performance envelope. The 2.3-litre Cosworth-powered Caterham CSR260 Superlight brings all the performance credentials associated with its stablemate; performance is quoted as a 0–60 mph time of 3.1 seconds and a top speed of 155 mph (249 km/h). The Superlight swaps the windscreen, carpet, heater, and weather gear on the standard car for a limited-slip differential and a quicker steering rack. There is a 25-kilo weight reduction over the standard CSR260, this model variant also adds distinctive Superlight styling to the exterior, including a wind deflector, a carbon-fibre dashboard and wings, a black powder-coated cockpit, and a quick-release MOMO steering wheel. Of particular note are 'Dynamic Suspensions' Damper units developed by a specialist Multimatic for the car. The damper units lend the already capable CSR a further edge in terms of handling and cornering performance. It features the same 2.3-litre (260 bhp) engine as the CSR260, but weighs only 550 kg (1,213 lb) and has a power-to-weight ratio of 472 bhp (352 kW)-per-tonne.

Caterham has a number of models, such as the Roadsport, Supersport and Superlight, that are occasionally re-introduced with chassis upgrades or changes in the engine options.

=== Variants ===
Since Caterham took over production from Lotus
Model	Years	Production	Image	Engine	Notes
7 Series 4	1973–1974	38		Ford Kent crossflow or Lotus-Ford Twin Cam	Carryover from Lotus production; ultimately discontinued due to manufacturing logistics issues
7 Series 3 Twin Cam	1974–1983	313		Lotus-Ford Twin Cam	CS3 3557 at the request of the purchaser, a New Zealand gentleman racer, was supplied with a 1962 cc twin cam Alfa Romeo Engine
7 Series 3 1300GT	1975–	4		Ford Kent crossflow	
7 Series 3 1600GT	1975–1992	338		Ford Kent crossflow	This 84 hp (63 kW) unit was the only version allowed to partake in British production car racing in the 1980s
1600 Sprint	1980–1992	212		Ford Kent crossflow (Caterham tune)	
VTA	1981–1985	41		Vegantune: 1598 cc Ford Cortina block, Vegantune designed twin cam head, with hemi-spherical combustion chambers	
Silver Jubilee	1981–1983	8		Ford Kent crossflow (Caterham tune)	Silver paint (excl. one BRG car) with coloured striping on bonnet and front wings
Avon A	1982–1983	2		Vegantune Lotus-Ford Twin Cam	Hi-spec features such as re-trimmed two-tone interior and pepperpot alloy wheels
1700 Supersprint	1982–	440		Ford Kent 1.7L (Caterham tune)	
1600 BDR	1983–1992	149		Cosworth BDR 1600	
1700 BDR	1986–1999	269		Cosworth BDR 1700	
HPC 1700	1986–1995	62		Cosworth BDR 1700	Purchase required taking performance driving course. Car was fitted with limited-slip differential.
CVH	1986–1991	91		Ford CVH	For Swiss export only
Prisoner	1989–	47 as of 2013		(Multiple available)	Trim package to commemorate The Prisoner television series
HPC	1990–1993	Unknown		Caterham-tuned Vauxhall VX with Twin 45 DCOE carburettors. 175BHP standard, Optional Swindon Racing Engine Upgrades to 218, 225, or 235 BHP	Purchase included a performance driving course run by John Lyon of HPC Limited (mandatory for drivers under 25 before taking delivery). Genuine HPC cars are not determined by the presence of the letter H in the 7th VIN position.
Vauxhall 16v cars – Caterham Vauxhall and Caterham VXI	1993–1999	Unknown		Powered by reconditioned Vauxhall XE 16v on Twin 45 Carburettors, or new Catalysted Vauxhall XE 16v on GM Injection	Often confused with genuine HPC due to by the presence of the letter H in the 7th VIN position. Some of these cars are built on the later Post 1996 "handbrake on tunnel" chassis. Caterham mismarketed some of these cars in order to shift an excess stock of HPC's unique parts.
35th Anniversary	1992–1994			(Multiple available)	Trim and equipment package to commemorate production of the Seven. Lotus green/yellow paint. Genuine 35th Anniversary cars will have a dashboard plaque.
7 GTS	1992	~40		Ford Kent crossflow	Intended as a return to the basics of the Seven, with a live axle and four-speed gearbox
7 Classic	1992–1998			Ford Kent crossflow	Even more minimal than the GTS, the Classic was intended as low-priced entry-level model.
1.4 K-Series	1991–1996			Rover K-Series	
1.4 K-Series Supersport	1993–1997			Rover K-Series	
Road-Sport	1996	30		Rover K-Series	Built with special trim, weight-reducing components, and the Caterham six-speed gearbox
JPE	1992–2001	53		Vauxhall twin-cam tuned to 250 bhp by Swindon Racing Engines	Very minimal and lightweight and with engine suggested to be similar to that used in British Touring Car Championship. The engine is in fact just forged pistons and an uprated cylinder head with Weber Alpha Injection. Several JPEs were built as special customer orders using steel internals and rated at 280 bhp, those these are very rare. In popular culture, this model plays a role as Sōichi Sugano's car in the anime series éX-Driver by Kōsuke Fujishima.
S7 Competition R	1995–2001	25		Turbocharged Vauxhall/Opel 2.0L	For Swiss market
1.6 K-Series	1996–2012			Rover K-Series	Introduced chassis modifications that improved rigidity and ride quality
40th Anniversary	1996–1998	67		Rover K-Series or Vauxhall 2.0L	Special trim including two-tone red-and-silver paint scheme
Superlight 1.6	1996–2004	196		Rover K-Series	Constructed with lightweight carbon fiber components
Superlight R	1997–2002	127		Rover K-Series Very High Performance Derivative (VHPD)	Equipped with numerous racing-inspired features
Classic VX 1600	1997–2002	224		Vauxhall 1.6L 8v	Inexpensive entry-level model with live rear axle
1.8 K-Series	1997–2006			Rover K-Series	
1.8 K-Series VVC	1997–2006			Rover K-Series	Employed engine with Rover's Variable Valve Control
Silverstone	1998–1999	3		Rover K-Series	Aluminum bodywork
Classic VX Supersprint	1998–2002	9		Vauxhall 1800 (Caterham tune)	
Clubsport	1998–1999	5		Rover K-Series	Intended for motorsport (with roll-over protection and fire suppression features)
Superlight R500	1999–2005	125		Rover K-Series (Caterham tune)	
Zetec	1998–2008	~250		Ford Zetec	Built for the United States market
Autosport 50th Anniversary	1999–2001	9		Rover K-Series	Painted red with a gold band around the nose, this special edition was built to commemorate Autosport magazine's 50th year of publication
Blackbird	2000–2001	15		Honda Blackbird 1.1L	
SV	2000–	1480 (as of December 2012)		(Multiple available)	First of the models with a wider and longer chassis for more interior space
GSX 1300R Hayabusa	2000–	14 (as of February 2013)		Suzuki Hayabusa 1.3L	For Canadian market. Built with sequential gearbox. Also available with Hayabusa 'R' Type engine, or with Rotrex supercharging
Fireblade	2001–2004	23		Honda Fireblade 919cc	Sequential gearbox, world record : fastest car going backwards (101 mph), rear live-axle, handrake lever under dashboard
Beaulieu	2001–2003	51		Vauxhall 1.6L	Entry-level model with live rear axle, rear drum brakes, and paint scheme to recall the Lotus 7
Superlight R300	2002–2006	~125		MG XPower Rover K-Series 1.8L	Intended as a less hard-core alternative to the Superlight R500
Superlight R400 XPower	2002–2005	68		MG XPower Rover K-Series 1.8L	Rebranded Superlight R with engine and other modifications
Superlight R500 evolution	2004	4		Rover K-Series	Superlight R500 with engine developed further by Minister Racing Engines and PTP (Powertrain Products)
1.4 K-Series Classic	2002–2012			Rover K-Series	
SV30	2003–2004	4		Rover K-Series	Built to commemorate the 30th year of the Caterham 7. All finished in Boston Green paint and fitted with 1.6L K-Series engine.
Tracksport	2003	2		MG XPower Rover K-Series	Intended for track use, and, like the SV30, was built to commemorate the 30th anniversary of the Caterham 7
RST-V8	2004–2008	4		Motopower RST-V8	Not an official Caterham offering; powered by the small-displacement V8 designed by Russell Savory and derived from Yamaha motorbike engines
CSR200	2005–2011			Cosworth-Ford Duratec	Used a developed SV chassis, with increased rigidity and pushrod front suspension
CSR260	2005–			Cosworth-Ford Duratec	Similar specification as the CSR200, but with further engine development to produce 260 hp
CSR260 Superlight	2006–2011			Cosworth-Ford Duratec	Lightened, minimalist version of the CSR260
Superlight 1.8	2005–2006	~5		MG XPower Rover K-Series	
Superlight R400 2.0	2006–	135 (as of December 2012)		Caterham-Rover K-Series	A relaunch of the Superlight R400 with Duratec (rather than K-Series) power
Roadsport Sigma	2006–	1260 (as of December 2012)		Ford Sigma	Marked the major transition from the Rover K-Series engine to the Ford Sigma/Duratec line
Sigma 270	2006–2021			Ford Sigma	
Axon 2R / Eco-M	2006–	2		Rover K-Series	High-fuel-economy prototype developed by Axon Automotive
Superlight 120 / 150	2006–			Ford Sigma	First of the 'Superlight' cars to be fitted with Ford Sigma engines
X330	2007	1		Cosworth-Ford Duratec	One-off built to celebrate Caterham's 50th anniversary. Fitted with Rotrex C30-94 supercharger.
50th Anniversary	2007	50 or fewer		(Multiple available)	Cosmetic changes only, including two-tone exterior colour schemes and a numbered plaque on the dashboard
RS Levante	2008	9		Motopower RST-V8	Available in either 400 hp normally-aspirated or 550 hp supercharged form
CDX	2008–2011	13		Rover K-Series	Replica of the "Caterham Driving Experience" track-day cars
Superlight R300	2008–	45 (in UK market)		Caterham Powertrain Duratec	
Superlight R500	2008–2014	175		Caterham Powertrain Duratec	
Roadsport 175	2008–			Caterham Powertrain Duratec	
CSR175	2009–	75 (as of December 2012)		Caterham Powertrain Duratec	Lower cost export model for Europe and Japan
Lambretta	2010	1		Ford Sigma	Trimmed and painted in Union Jack colours, in partnership with Lambretta Clothing and Oxted Trimming
Roadsport 125 Monaco	2010–2011	25		Ford Sigma	Cosmetic package for the Roadsport, inspired by the Flag of Monaco
Team Lotus	2011–	37 (as of December 2012)		(Multiple available)	Lotus green-and-yellow colour scheme
Supersport	2011–2014			Caterham-Ford Sigma	
Supersport R	2012–2015			Caterham Powertrain Duratec	
160/165	2013- 2016			Suzuki K6A (turbo)	160 for the UK, 165 for Europe
620	2013-			Ford Duratec	
270	2015- 2021			Ford Sigma	
360	2015-			Ford Duratec	
420	2015-			Ford Duratec	
310	2016–2021			Ford Sigma	
Super Seven 1600	2020- 2022			Ford Sigma	Retro inspired body styling and paint options
170	2021-			Suzuki R06A (turbo)	Upgraded 160/165 with new engine
Super Seven 600	2022-			Suzuki R06A (turbo)	Seven 170 with retro-inspired body styling and paint options
Super Seven 2000	2022-			Ford Duratec	Retro inspired body styling and paint options
420 Cup	2022-			Ford Duratec	
CSR Twenty	2024-	20		Ford Duratec	Commemorating 20 years of the CSR chassis
310 Encore	2025–	25		Ford Sigma	
Model	Years	Production	Image	Engine	Notes

== Caterham 7 literature ==
The Caterham 7 has spawned many books, test reports, and articles, many of which are still in print.

- Lotus & Caterham Sevens Gold Portfolio, 1957–1989 Edited by R.M. Clarke, Brooklands Books, 1989, test reports and articles from magazines around the world ISBN 1-85520-000-7.
- Lotus & Caterham Seven Gold Portfolio, 1974–95 Edited by R.M. Clarke, Brooklands Books, 1996, test reports and articles from magazines around the world ISBN 978-1-85520-330-3.
- The Legend of the Lotus Seven Dennis Ortenberger, Osprey, 1981, reissued in 1999 by Mercian manuals ISBN 0-85045-411-5.
- The Lotus and Caterham Sevens, A Collector's Guide Jeremy Coulter, Motor Racing Publications Ltd., 1986, ISBN 0-947981-06-3.
- Lotus Seven: Restoration, Preparation, Maintenance Tony Weale, Osprey Automotive, 1991, includes Caterham Sevens up to 1990 ISBN 1-85532-153-X.
- Caterham Sevens: The Official Story of a Unique British Sportscar Chris Rees, Motorbooks International, 1997, ISBN 978-0-947981-97-6.
- Side Glances, Volumes 1, 2, 3. A fourth volume is entitled Side Glances: The Best from America's Most Popular Automotive Writer, Peter Egan, Brooklands Books, and Road & Track. Peter Egan's books are collections of his Road & Track column "Side Glances". Many feature his Lotus Sevens but there is also information on Caterham Sevens.
- Lotus and Caterham Seven: Racers for the Road, John Tipler, Crowood Press, 2005, ISBN 978-1-86126-754-2.
- The Magnificent 7: The enthusiasts' guide to all models of Lotus and Caterham Seven, Chris Rees, Haynes Publishing, Second edition 2007, ISBN 978-1-84425-410-1.
- Why build a Seven? Putting a Sportscar on the Road, a personal record, Michael Eddenden, 2010, self-published via lulu.com, the building of a Caterham 7 from a Club perspective, it includes much on Lotus and Caterham Seven owners ISBN 978-0-557-54398-4.
- Roadster: How, and Especially Why, a Mechanical Novice Built a Car from a Kit Chris Goodrich, Harper, 1998, a "mechanical novice" builds a Super 7 and explores its history ISBN 978-0060191931.
