= MG XPower =

British car marque

- Product type: Automotive Brand
- Current owner: MG Sports and Racing Limited
- Country: United Kingdom; Longbridge (2001–2005); Tenbury Wells (2008–present)
- Related brands: MG SV–R; Rover Motorsport
- Previous owners: MG Rover; Rover Group; Phoenix Venture Holdings

MG XPower is a British automotive brand created by MG Rover Group in 2001 and now owned by MG Sports and Racing Europe, based in Tenbury Wells.

== Overview ==
The MG XPower brand was created by MG Rover for their motorsport subsidiary, MG Sport & Racing Ltd., in 2001. The brand was subsequently used for the MG XPower SV sports car in 2002.

William Riley bought the rights to the brand from the administrators in 2008, following the collapse of MG Rover three years earlier.

=== Vehicles Developed By MG Rover (2001–2005) ===
- MG TF XPower 500 – A 500PS race derived XPower concept for the MG TF designed to accommodate the brand new engine XP 20 used in the race car MG Lola EX257 with the Garrett turbocharger and an anti lag system which achieves 500PS.
- MG ZT 385 – A 385PS race derived XPower Concept for the MG ZT V8. Uses an engine derived for the MG XPower SV.
- MG ZT 500 – A 500PS race derived XPower Concept for the MG ZT V8. Uses a 5.0L V8
- MG ZT-T V8 – Roush supercharged V8 MG ZT-T that broke the world record for the fastest estate car at Bonneville in September 2003.
- MG SV – Supercar based on the Qvale Mangusta – 4.6L Ford V8 with 324PS
- MG SV-R – Supercar based on the Qvale Mangusta – 5.0L Ford V8 with 385PS
- MG SV-S – Supercar based on the Qvale Mangusta – 4.6L Ford V8 with 385PS (Supercharged) – only three made
- MG SV-RS – Supercar based on the Qvale Mangusta – 4.6L Ford V8 with 385PS (Supercharged) – SV R with SV S engine (only one made)
- MG ZR MK2 XPower – XPower ZR in biomorphic green, rear splitter, and other upgrades showing the MK2 ZR.
- MG ZS EX259 BTCC – MG ZS Touring Car. Ran by WSR, and originally raced with the livery of XPower and the sponsorship for Hot Wheels, later ran with the livery for the RAC.
- MG-Lola EX257 – Lola Racecar with an XP 20 engine.
- MG ZR EX258 – MG ZR Rallycar.

=== Vehicles Developed By William Riley (since 2005) ===
- MG XPower WR
- MG XPower SV S WRC
