= MG XPower SV =

British sports car by MG Rover

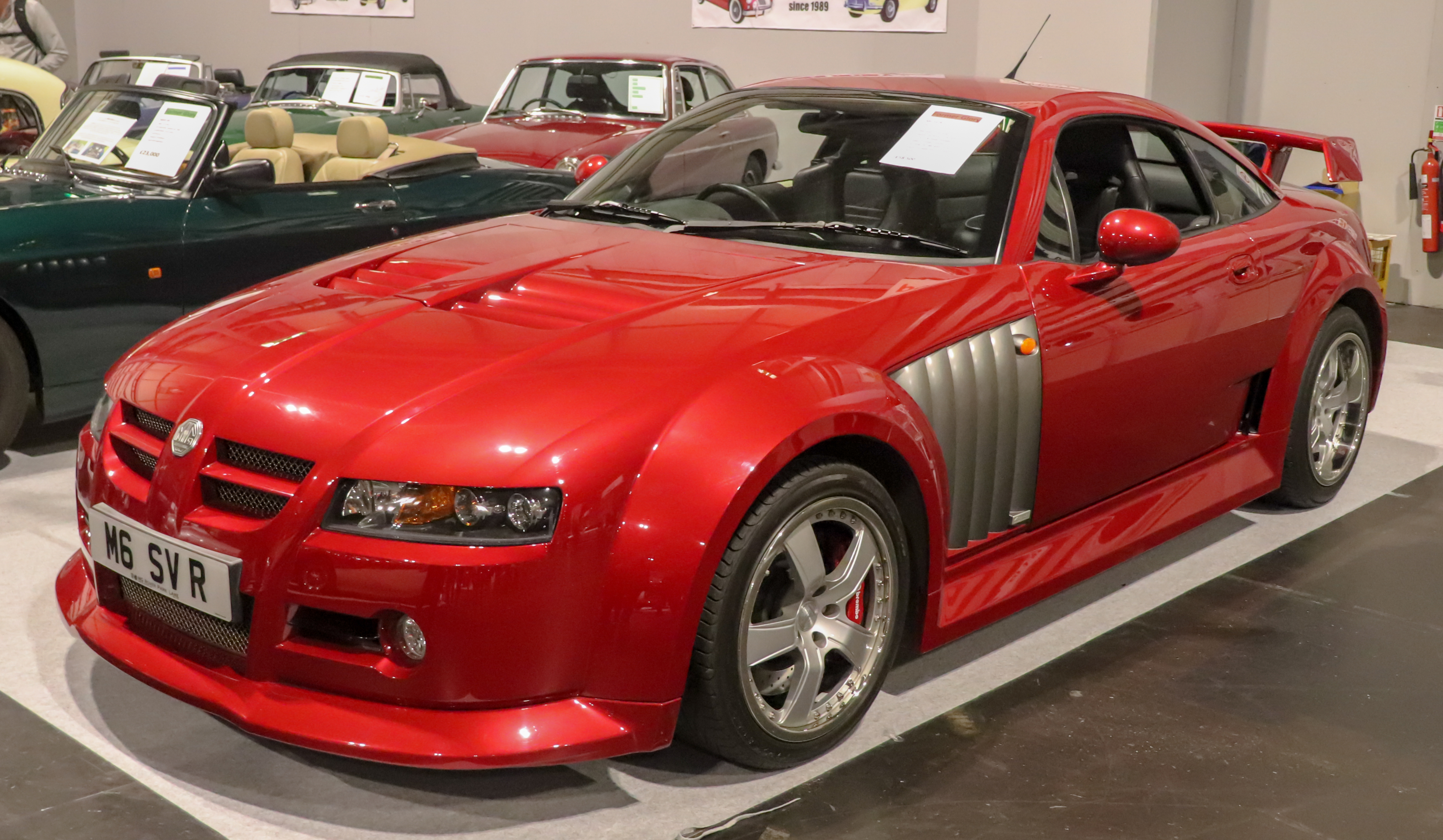
- 2005 MG XPower SV-R

Overview
- Manufacturer: MG (MG Rover)
- Production: 2003–2005; 82 produced
- Assembly: Italy: Modena (Qvale Modena S.p.A: chassis); United Kingdom: Longbridge, Birmingham (Longbridge plant: final assembly)
- Designer: Peter Stevens

Body and chassis
- Class: Sports car (S)
- Body style: 2-door coupé
- Layout: Longitudinally-mounted, Front-engine, rear-wheel drive
- Related: Qvale Mangusta

Powertrain
- Engine: 4.6-litre Ford Modular V8; 5.0-litre Ford Modular V8
- Transmission: 5-speed Tremec manual; 4-speed automatic

Dimensions
- Wheelbase: 2,658 mm (104.6 in)
- Length: 4,480 mm (176.4 in)
- Width: 1,900 mm (74.8 in)
- Height: 1,320 mm (52.0 in)
- Kerb weight: 1,540 kg (3,395 lb)

The MG XPower SV is a sports car that was produced by British automobile manufacturer MG Rover. Manufactured in Modena, Italy and finished at Longbridge, United Kingdom, it was based on the platform of the Qvale Mangusta, formerly the De Tomaso Biguá.

== History ==
After acquiring Italian automobile manufacturer Qvale, MG Rover allocated the project code X80, and set up the subsidiary company, MG X80 Ltd., to produce a new model based on the Qvale Mangusta. One attraction was the potential sales in the United States, as the Mangusta had already been homologated, for the market in the United States.

The MG X80 was originally unveiled as the concept car, in June 2001. However, the styling was considered too sedate. When the production model, now renamed MG XPower SV, was eventually launched the following year, Peter Stevens, previously the exterior designer of the McLaren F1, had made the car's styling more aggressive.

The conversion from a clay model to a production car, including all requirements, was done in just three hundred days, by the Swedish company, Caran. The goal was to get a retail price of under £100,000. The car's base model eventually cost £65,000, with the uprated model XPower SV-R, costing £83,000.

The production process was complex, partly caused by the use of carbon fibre, to make the body panels. The basic body parts were made in the United Kingdom by SP Systems, and then shipped to Belco Avia, near Turin, for assembly into body panels.

These were then assembled into a complete body shell, and fitted onto the box frame chassis and running gear, and shipped to the factory of MG Rover, in Longbridge, to be trimmed and finished. Several of the cars’ exterior and interior parts, were sourced from current and past models of Fiat.

The headlights, for example, were taken from the second generation Punto, and the rear lights from the Fiat Coupé. Exterior door handles from a MG TF, Mirrors, Window switches and interior door handles from the Rover 75. In total, the production process required each vehicle to visit six different companies. According to the data at the MG XPower SV Club, approximately 82 cars were produced, excluding the four 'XP' pre production prototypes.

This included the few pre production and show cars, which were later dismantled before production was stopped, due to lack of sales. Most were sold to private owners, with the final ones being sold to customers, at the beginning of 2008. Three vehicles, that had been produced, but not assembled, were acquired by classic car dealer Eclectic Cars Limited in March 2013, and later completed. Another partially completed chassis is in storage with a private owner in the UK.

Most were sold in Europe and Asia, with only one model sold in America, the supercharged model, the XP.

The decision to develop a niche sports car, rather than work on replacements for its core family cars, has been described as symptomatic of the strategic mistakes, that ultimately led to MG Rover's untimely demise. By the time the company entered administration in April 2005, only nine XPower SVs had been sold. Rowan Atkinson purchased an XPower SV in February 2005.

== Variants ==
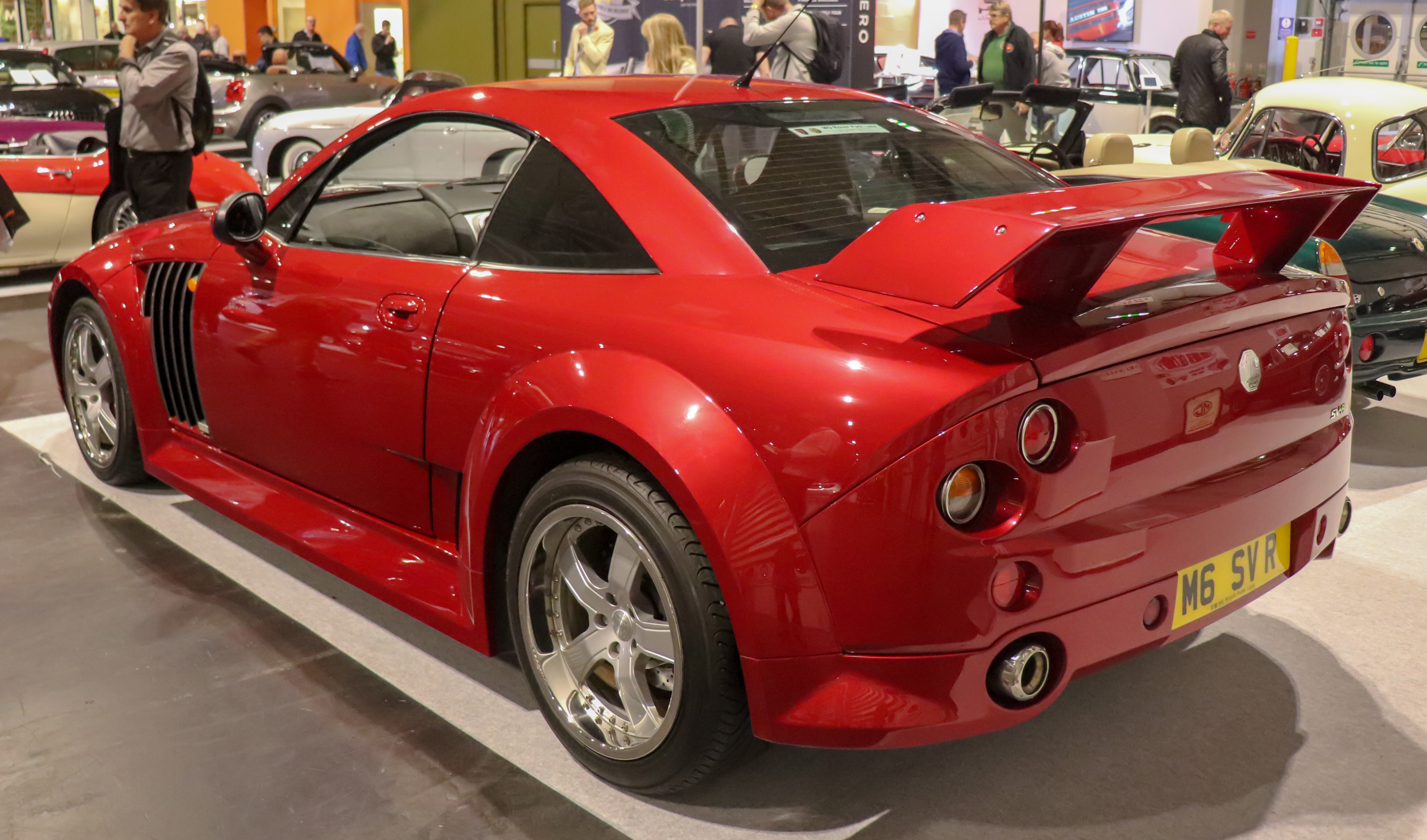
Rear view

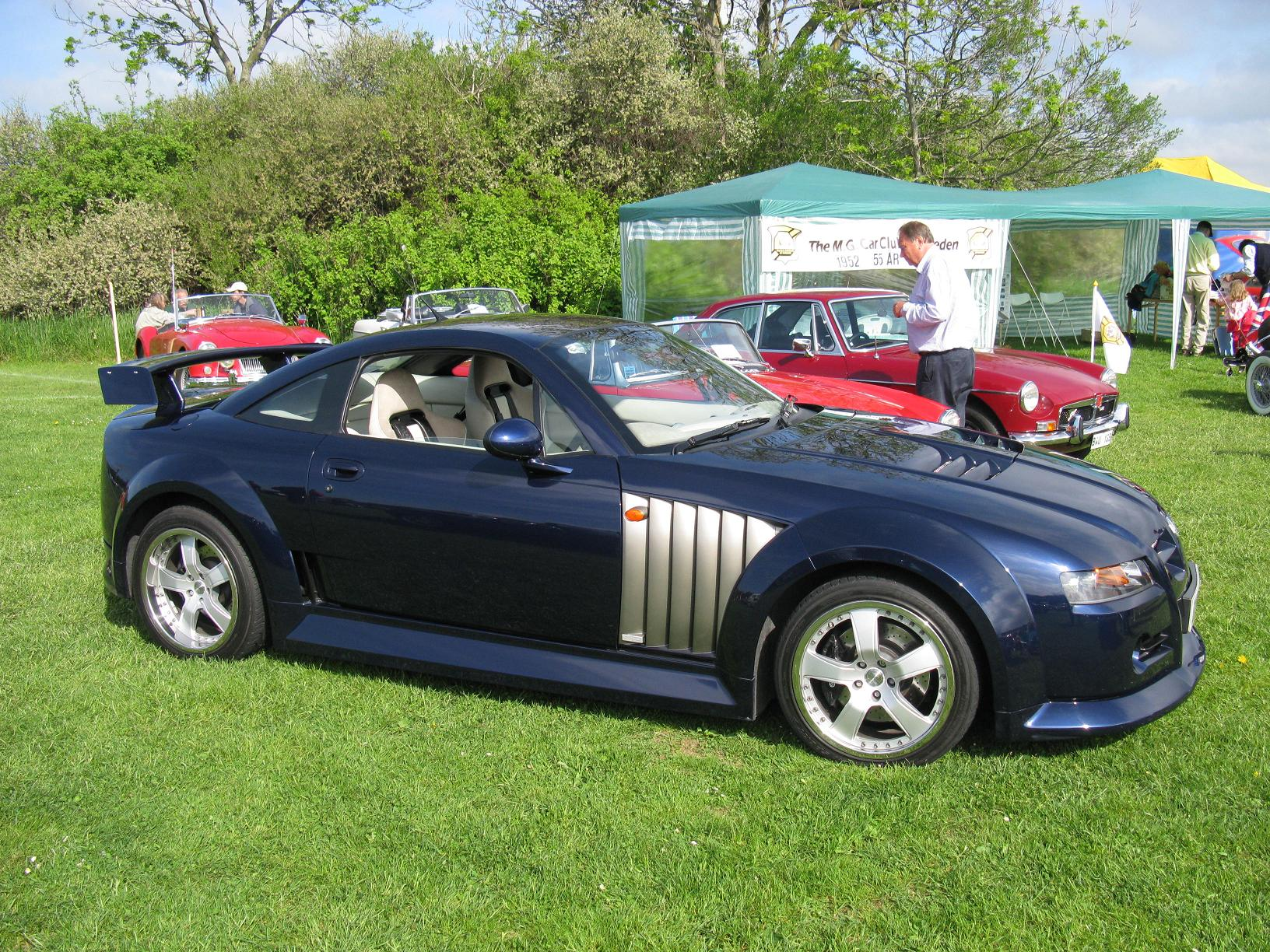
MG XPower SV-R

The base MG XPower SV is powered by a 4.6 L Ford Modular V8 which is rated at 320 hp (239 kW; 324 PS) at 6,000 rpm and 410 N⋅m (302 lb⋅ft) of torque at 4,750 rpm. The SV's advanced carbon fibre body helped it achieve a top speed of 165 mph (266 km/h) and a 0 to 60 mph (97 km/h) time of 5.3 seconds.

Club Sport options, for customers who wished to use their SV on the track, were planned but never produced.

The XPower SV-R, released the following year, features a Roush tuned, "cammer" 5.0 L 32 valve Modular V8. MG claimed the SV-R's engine was rated at 385 hp (287 kW; 390 PS), however some sources claim this figure is actually closer to 410 hp (306 kW; 416 PS).

The top speed was estimated to be around 175 mph (282 km/h), and its 0 to 60 mph (97 km/h) time to be close to 4.9 seconds.

Unlike the base model SV, the SV-R was offered with a choice of either manual or automatic transmissions.

== Performance ==
Performance data, for the range of the MG XPower SV:

Model	Displacement	Bore x stroke	Power	Torque	0–60 mph (0–97 km/h)	Top speed
2003 SV	4,601 cc (281 cu in)	90.2 mm × 90 mm (3.55 in × 3.54 in)	320 hp (239 kW; 324 PS) at 6,000 rpm	302 lb⋅ft (410 N⋅m) at 4,750 rpm	5.3 seconds	165 mph (266 km/h)
2004 SV-R	4,997 cc (305 cu in)	94 mm × 90 mm (3.70 in × 3.54 in)	385 hp (287 kW; 390 PS) at 6,000 rpm	376 lb⋅ft (510 N⋅m) at 4,750 rpm	4.9 seconds	175 mph (282 km/h)

== XPower WR ==
In July 2008, William Riley, who claims to be a descendant of the dynasty of Riley Motor, although this has been disputed, bought XPower SV related assets from the administrators of MG Rover, PricewaterhouseCoopers. Riley formed MG Sports and Racing Europe Ltd to continue production of the model. MG Sports and Racing Europe, based in Eardiston, near Tenbury Wells in Worcestershire, announced the relaunch of the XPower SV in April 2008, under the name MG XPower WR.

Priced at between £75,000 and £90,000, the new model had the supercharged engine rated at 540 bhp (403 kW; 547 PS), and seven cars were said to have already been sold. Riley's use of the "MG" trademark resulted in a legal dispute with Nanjing Automobile (Group) Corporation, which had also acquired assets of the defunct MG Rover Group. This case was won by Nanjing in February 2010.

It was reported in the press in December 2009, that no new cars had been manufactured by MG Sports and Racing Europe since its founding, and that employment tribunal proceedings had been initiated by two employees, for non payment of wages. Riley was also arrested by police in December 2009, on suspicion of theft of an XPower WR car, previously sold to one Canadian businessman, who had been working on behalf of the company.
