= Caterham 7 CSR =

CSR 200/260
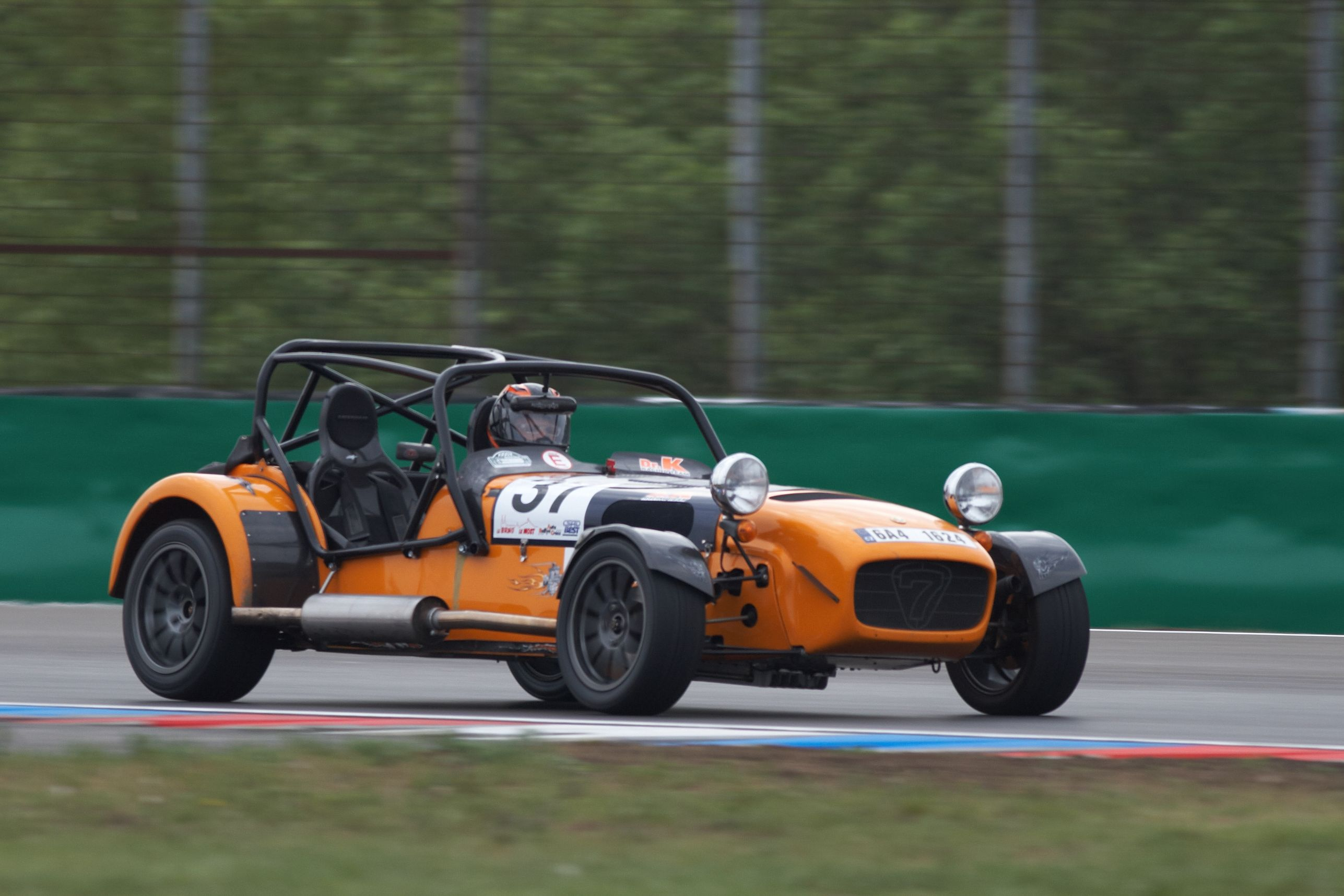
- Caterham CSR

Overview
- Manufacturer: Caterham Cars Ltd

Body and chassis
- Layout: Longitudinal front-engine, rear-wheel drive

Powertrain
- Engine: 2.3 litre inline four Ford Duratec tuned by Cosworth; 200 or 260 bhp (190 kW)
- Transmission: Standard 5-speed (200 model), Custom Caterham close ratio 6-speed (260 model)

Dimensions
- Wheelbase: 2,315 mm (7 ft 7.1 in)
- Length: 3,300 mm (10 ft 10 in)
- Width: 1,685 mm (5 ft 6.3 in)
- Height: 1,015 mm (3 ft 4.0 in) (hood down), 1,140 mm (45 in) (hood up)
- Kerb weight: 575 kg (1268 lb)

Chronology
- Predecessor: Caterham 7 SV

The Caterham Seven CSR is a sports car manufactured by Caterham Cars. The CSR is the most heavily modified Caterham, though it still retains the basic look of the Super Seven. The CSR has two engine options based on the same Duratec block, though modifications and power output differ. The entry level engine produces 200 bhp (149 kW), with a 0–60 mph (0–97 km/h) time of 3.7 seconds. The upgraded engine produces 260 bhp (194 kW), with a 0–60 mph (0–97 km/h) time of 3.1 seconds and a top speed of 155 mph (249 km/h).

== Performance ==
The CSR represents the most radical redesign of the car since the introduction of the Seven in its 48-year history. The CSR is the subject of numerous improvements over previous models (see below), though it still retains the main aesthetics of Caterhams.

=== Handling and braking ===
While slightly heavier than other Caterhams the CSR still upholds Colin Chapman's philosophy of "add lightness." Weighing only 575 kg (1,268 lb), the CSR has excellent handling, making it extremely agile. On the skidpad, the Caterham outperforms many supercars. Its 1.05 lateral g-force beats the 2007 Porsche 997 Turbo's 0.94 G, the Ferrari F50's 1.03 G, and the Ferrari Enzo's 1.01 G.

In braking tests, the CSR performs well. From 70 mph (113 km/h) to a complete stop, the CSR took 140 feet (43 m). The 997 Turbo, stopping from 60 mph took 99 feet (30 m). The Ferrari F50 performed well, stopping from 60 mph (97 km/h) in 119 feet (36 m). For comparison, an average 2011 road car (2011 Chevrolet Cruze LS) takes 167 feet (51 m) to completely stop from 70 mph (110 km/h) and Formula One cars can stop in 56 feet (17 m) from 62 mph (100 km/h).

=== Low-end acceleration ===
The CSR has excellent low-end acceleration because of its high power-to-weight ratio of 410 bhp (310 kW) per ton (260 model). It can accelerate from a stop to 60 mph (97 km/h) in 3.1 seconds (estimated), though during trials, Car and Driver magazine could only achieve 3.6 seconds. This discrepancy is due to the close gear ratios of the transmission and the rev limiter. The CSR that they tested could not reach 60 mph (97 km/h) in first gear, and required the extra 0.5 seconds to shift. Car and Driver explains:

It’s also wickedly quick, blowing past 60 mph (97 km/h) in 3.6 seconds... The Caterham had an improperly set rev limiter that cut fuel at 7,700 rpm, 300 rpm short of the redline and 2 mph (3.2 km/h) short of 60 mph (97 km/h). At 7,700 rpm, the Caterham is going 58 mph (93 km/h), so we had to do a time-consuming shift before hitting 60 mph... With the correct fuel cutoff, at 8,000 rpm... it would likely hit 60 mph (97 km/h) in the low threes.

For comparison the Porsche 997 Turbo, which has AWD and weighs over twice as much as the CSR, has a power-to-weight ratio of only 269 bhp (201 kW) per ton, but has a 0–60 mph (0–97 km/h) time of 3.4 seconds.

=== High-speed lift ===
The CSR, as with all Caterhams, has worse performance at higher speeds with respect to both acceleration and handling because of the poor aerodynamics. Caterhams suffer not only from a high drag coefficient of Cd=0.7, but also from lift. Though there have been improvements in aerodynamics, the CSR still has 50 lb (23 kg) of lift at 100 mph (161 km/h). These factors hinder both high-end acceleration, top speed, and handling. With such strong wind resistance, it requires much more power to overcome that force and increase top speed. Lift reduces contact force on the tires, causing the car to feel "loose" and not handle as well.

=== Cosworth engine ===
The 260 bhp (194 kW) Cosworth-tuned engine is heavily modified from the stock 2.3 litre Duratec. The cylinder head, block, crankshaft, connecting rods and pistons are upgraded by Cosworth. Cosworth also integrates an advanced dry-sump with an extra internal scavenge pump to distribute the oil. While a dry-sump system requires more oil (more weight), a dry-sump will keep the engine lubricated under hard cornering unlike a wet-sump system. Cosworth also radicalizes the cam shafts and upgrades the exhaust system. This may cause the engine to run a little more "rough" at low RPMs, but it drastically increases performance. The inlet system is also replaced with an advanced, custom roller-barrel system. This increases airflow at full throttle compared to a butterfly inlet, boosting performance. The engine also has a custom chip designed by Cosworth for a further increase in performance.

The 200 bhp (150 kW) model uses the same Duratec block, but is not as heavily modified. The connecting rods and pistons are not upgraded significantly, though it does have the dry-sump system. The cam shafts are slightly radicalized, and the exhaust system is upgraded. The inlet system is enlarged, but not replaced with the roller-barrel system. The computer chip is upgraded, but not to the extent of the 260 model. Generally speaking, the 200 model is upgraded, albeit not as heavily.

=== Other features ===
The CSR, has a variety of other features which enhance its performance. There are no power brakes or power steering, making the CSR extremely responsive and extremely agile. The clutch also engages extremely high, allowing for quick shifts while racing. In addition, the flywheel is very light. This makes heel-and-toe shifting extremely quick and easy as the engine revs up very quickly with little momentum.

== Improvements ==
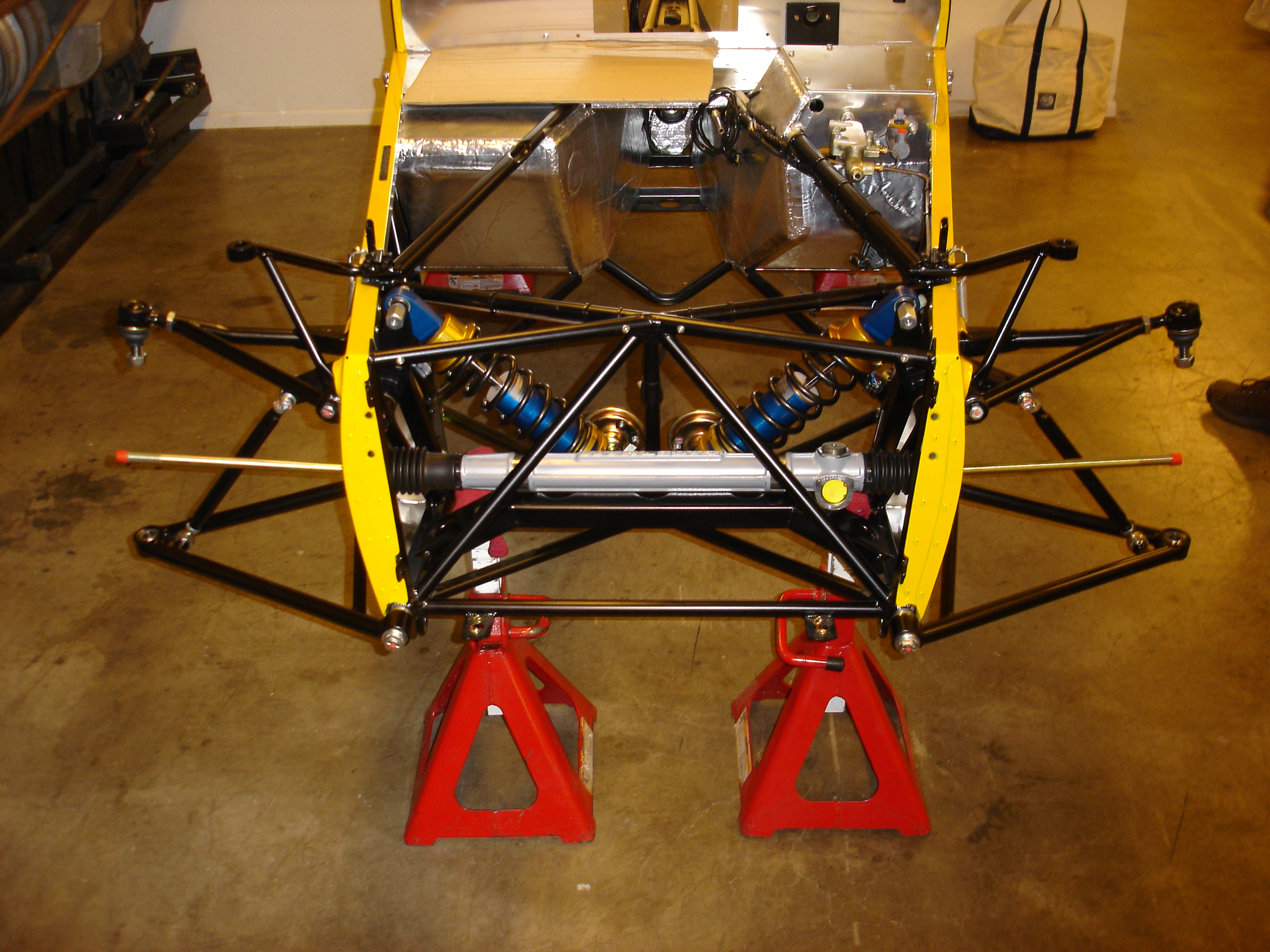
The springs and dampers installed inboard (push-rods, calipers not installed).

The overall strength of the chassis is improved with the addition of new tubular steel to the frame. The weight of the car increases, but the torsional stiffness is improved by somewhere between 25% and 100%. The added reinforcement was necessary in order for the CSR to support the heavy 2.3 litre Duratec engine. The CSR is also wider than previous models, which increases handling ability.

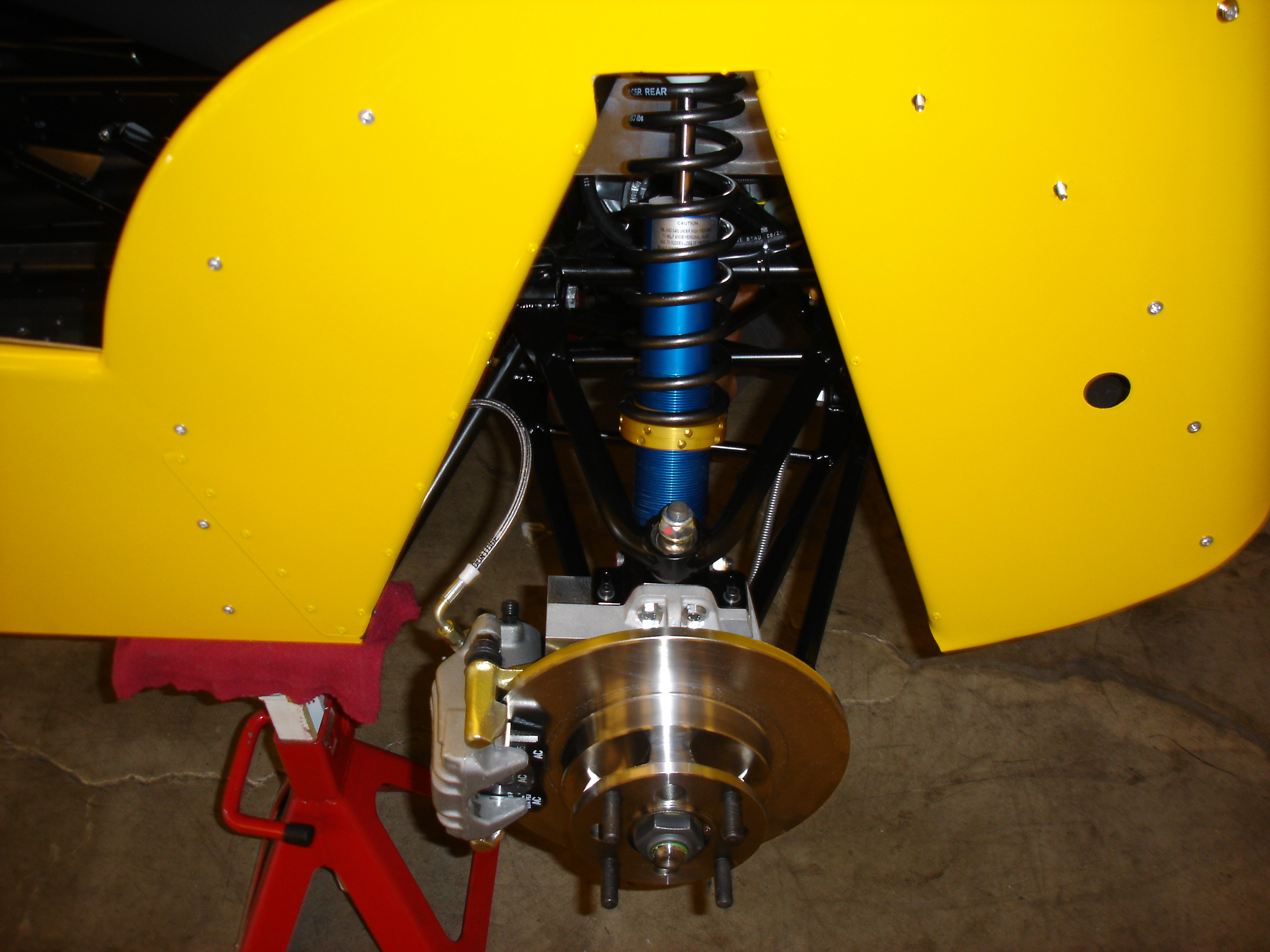
The rear suspension is fully independent.

Both rear and front suspension were completely redesigned for the CSR. The front suspension has double wishbone, fully adjustable, inboard springs and dampers, improving aerodynamics. The rear suspension is also upgraded to a double wishbone, fully independent system, replacing the De Dion tube design.

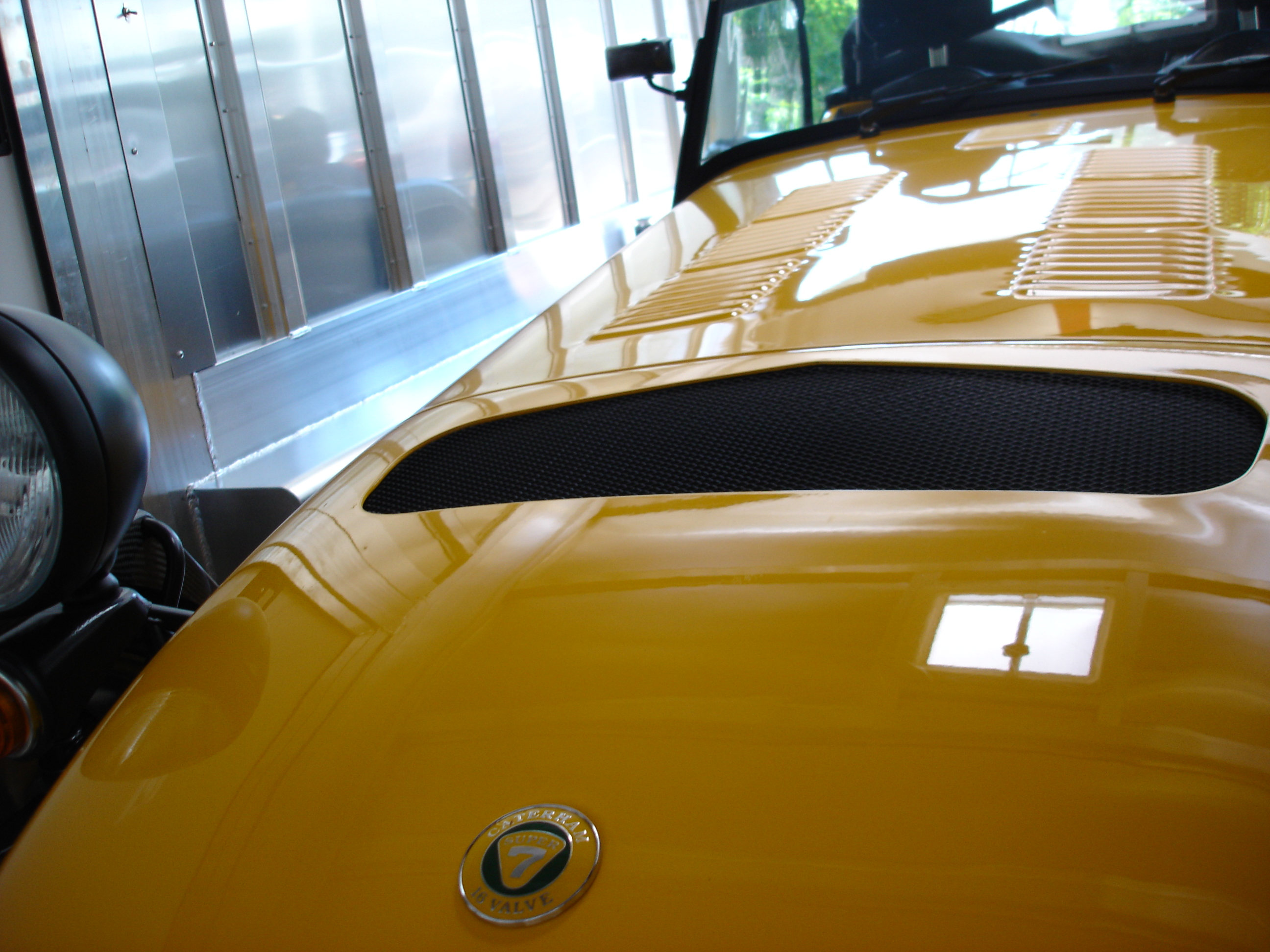
The radiator vent on the nosecone improves aerodynamics.

Caterhams have very poor aerodynamics due to the blunt windscreen, open-wheel design, and open cockpit. At very high speeds, lift becomes a problem. To combat this, the CSR has several features that reduce lift by 50%. The front cycle wings are fitted closer to the tires to reduce turbulence. In addition, they have a small lip that angles air upward and creates a small amount of down force. Also, the new front suspension scheme reduces turbulence and drag formerly caused by the spring and damper units. The biggest enhancement is the vent added on top of the nose cone. On previous Caterhams, the air from the radiator caused turbulence by knocking against the engine and other parts on the underside. A plastic panel behind the radiator now directs air straight out through the vent, creating down force and reducing turbulence.

== Review ==
Overall, the reviews of the CSR have been positive. Most magazines have only reviewed the 260 model. The main criticisms relate to the ease of driving and cost.

- Automobile Magazine's Preston Lerner was impressed by the performance of the CSR:

The Caterham is the purest and most honest street car I've ever driven. Period. No power steering. No power brakes. No drive-by-wire. Just a direct connection between you and the contact patch. The responses to steering, throttle, brake, and gearshift inputs are so nearly instantaneous that they verge on the telepathic. And I can see exactly what's happening, at least at the front end of the car, as the wheels turn and judder.

- But complains about its uncomfortable ride:

"The CSR is not built for long-distance highway travel. Although the ride quality falls short of punishing, I had strongly discourage using the car for emergency surgery. The otherwise comfy seats move fore and aft, but the rake is fixed, which can be-and was for me-a real pain. Speaking of driver discomforts, there's no dead pedal for your left foot, and your right thigh gets a good grilling from the aluminum transmission tunnel. The snap-shut side curtains cannot be raised or lowered like conventional windows, so you're either freezing or sweltering."

- Autocar complains about the price, but enjoys the CSR overall:

"Which brings us on to the CSR 260’s biggest problem: the price. A basic CSR 260 costs £37,000 if Caterham builds it, £34,500 if you do it yourself. Then there’s paint at £795, or £1100 for metallic. And those carbon seats? Lovely, but they cost £1200. Aerofoil front suspension arms are very cool, but should be for £500. And that limited-slip differential is £750. Caterham is asking a lot of money for this car.
The CSR 260 is an intoxicating, extreme car, with racecar-like performance, fabulous grip levels and exceptional steering and handling. Few road cars will keep up with it in a straight line, fewer still down a twisting road or on a race track, and it has an excellent engine. But it isn’t perfect — the car’s packaging is showing its age and Caterham is demanding a serious amount of cash for a car that is so compromised — and so spartan."

- Edmunds.com enjoyed the CSR overall:

"The CSR has got to be the performance bargain of the car world, despite any flaws when it comes to civility. As previously mentioned, the roof and flimsy side doors are useless. Luggage space is nearly nonexistent, and you better be OK with the fact that anything short of a Razor scooter will tower over you on the road. But what is all this harping about creature comforts? This is a Caterham Seven after all, the fastest to ever leave the factory and maybe the quickest accelerating car on the planet. That counts more than cupholders any day."

== Purchasing and licensing ==
=== In the UK ===
The CSR is a legal production vehicle under the Individual Vehicle Approval scheme pending a vehicle inspection. The CSR may be purchased from Caterham directly as they are manufactured in the UK.

=== In the United States ===
The CSR was released in the United States in the summer of 2006 in very limited quantities. As a production vehicle, the CSR is illegal because of lack of safety features and failure to meet emissions standards. US law states that the engine and transmission must be purchased separately from the chassis. Chassis may be purchased from Superformance, Caterham's official distributor in the United States, and their network of dealerships nationwide.

While many previous models of Caterhams are sold as kit cars to customers in the US, the complexity of the CSR makes this much more difficult, and is discouraged by dealers. It is currently not a part of the US lineup available through Superformance. As such, the CSR is not a kit car. It is a production vehicle built in England. Licensing depends on individual state, county, and city regulations.

== Facts and figures ==
=== Engine specifications ===
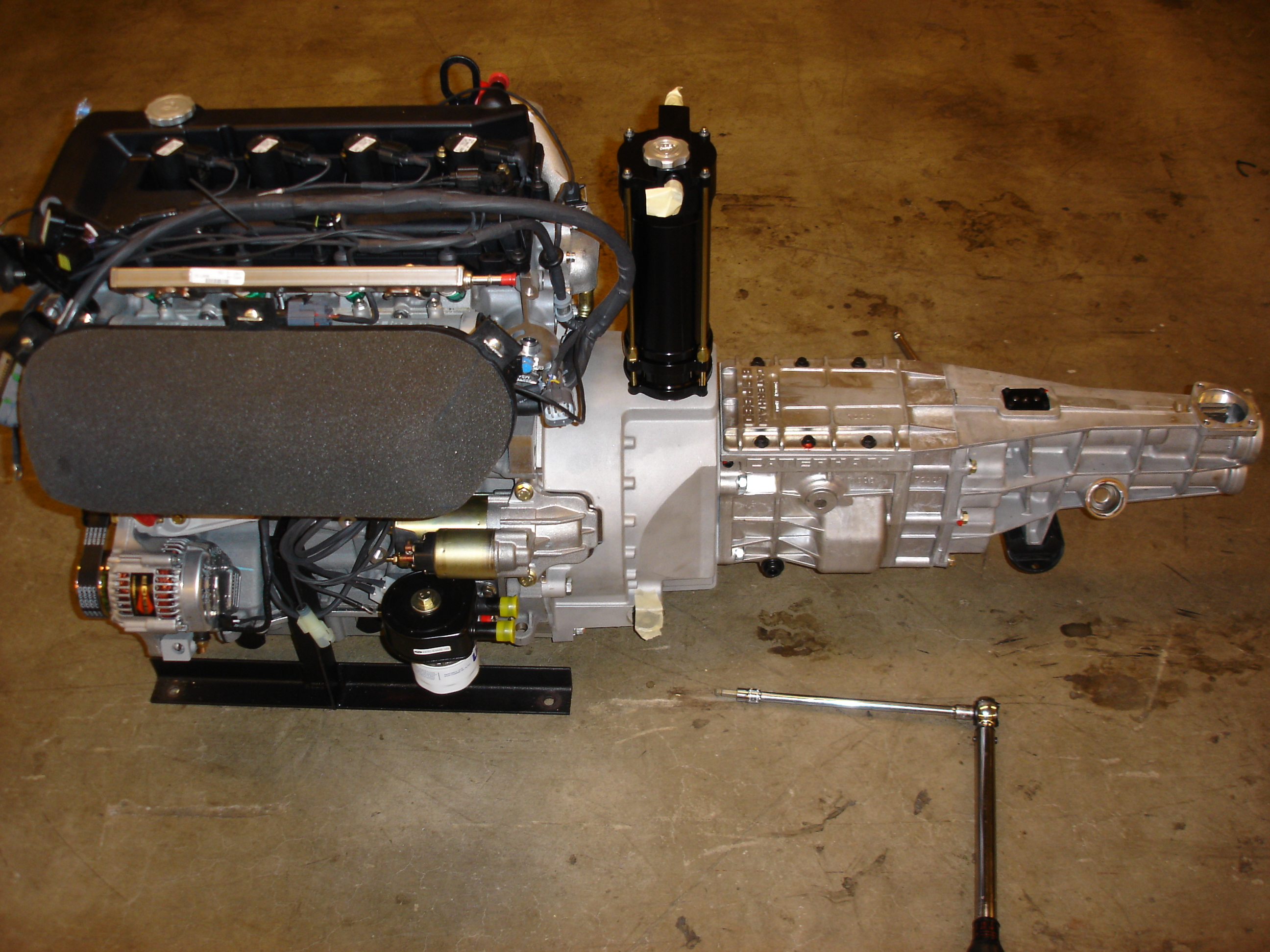
The Cosworth 260 attached to bellhousing and 6-speed transmission. The black tower is part of the dry-sump oil distribution system.

2.3-litre Ford Duratec tuned by Cosworth inline four

- Displacement: 2.3 L 2,261 cc (138.0 cu in)
- Bore and Stroke: 87.5 mm (3.4 in) X 94 mm (3.7 in) (undersquare)
- Valves: 16 valves, dual overhead camshafts
- Compression Ratio: 12:1
- Cooling: Water Cooled
- Oil Distribution: dry-sump with scavenge pump
- 260 Model
  - Maximum Power: 260 bhp (194 kW; 264 PS) at 7500 rpm
  - Maximum Torque: 200 lb⋅ft (271 N⋅m) at 6200 rpm
  - Power-to-Weight Ratio: 0.205 bhp (0.153 kW) per 1 pound (0.45 kg), or 410 bhp (310 kW) per ton
  - Throttle Body: Upgraded Roller-Barrel system
- 200 Model
  - Maximum Power: 200 bhp (149 kW; 203 PS) at 7000 rpm
  - Maximum Torque: 165 lb⋅ft (224 N⋅m) at 5750 rpm
  - Power-to-Weight Ratio: 0.158 bhp (0.118 kW) per 1 pound (0.45 kg), or 315 bhp (235 kW) per ton
  - Throttle Body: Widened butterfly system

=== Transmission specifications ===
Gear	Ratio (260 Model)	Ratio (200 Model)
1	2.69:1	3.36:1
2	2.01:1	1.81:1
3	1.59:1	1.26:1
4	1.32:1	1.00:1
5	1.13:1	0.82:1
6	1.00:1	–
Final drive	3.38:1	3.92:1

=== Performance specifications ===
- Lateral Acceleration: 1.05 g on skidpad
- 70-0 mph (Brake Test): 140 feet (43 m)
- 0-60 mph
  - 260 Model: 3.1 seconds (estimated) reported by manufacturer, reported as 3.6 seconds by Car and Driver See above for explanation of discrepancy.
  - 200 Model: 3.7 seconds (estimated)
- 0-100 mph: 8.9 seconds (260 model)
- 0-120 mph:15 seconds (260 model)
- Quarter Mile: 12.1 seconds at 113 mph (182 km/h) (260 model)
- Top Speed: 155 mph (249 km/h) (260 model), 140 mph (225 km/h) (200 model)

=== Vehicle specifications ===
- Size and dimensions
  - Kerb weight: 575 kg (1268 lb)
  - Wheelbase: 2,315 mm (91.1 in)
  - Length: 3,300 mm (130 in)
  - Width: 1,685 mm (66.3 in)
  - Height: 1,015 mm (40.0 in) (hood down), 1,140 mm (45 in) (hood up)
  - Ground Clearance: 100 mm (3.9 in)
- Fuel Economy: 10.22 litres/100 km (23 mpg)
- Turning Radius: 11 m
- Steering: Rack and pinion, 2.2 turns lock to lock
- Brakes: 254 mm (10") discs, front vented, 4 piston front calipers
- Front Track: 1,505 mm (59.3 in)
- Rear Track: 1,465 mm (57.7 in)
- Seating Capacity: 2
- Tires: Avon CR500's, 195/45 R15 front, 245/40 R15 rear
- Lift: 50 lb (23 kg) at 100 mph (161 km/h)
- Weight Distribution (Front-Rear): 49–51%

== See also ==
- Caterham Cars
- Lotus Seven
