= MG Sports and Racing Europe =

- Industry: Automotive
- Founded: 29 January 2007
- Founder: William Riley
- Defunct: 12 February 2010
- Headquarters: Eardiston, near Tenbury Wells, England
- Key people: William Riley
- Products: Automobile
- Website: http://www.mg-x-power.com/

MG Sports and Racing Europe Limited was a British automotive company based in Eardiston, Tenbury Wells in Worcestershire. The company was founded by William Riley, who acquired assets of the MG Sport and Racing subsidiary of MG Rover Group after its demise, with the intention of restarting production of the MG XPower SV sportscar, renamed MG XPower WR. The company was registered on 29 January 2007.

In December 2009, it was reported in the press that no new cars had been manufactured by MG Sports and Racing Europe since its founding, and that employment tribunal proceedings had been initiated by two employees for non-payment of wages. Riley was also arrested by police in 2009 on suspicion of theft of an XPower WR car previously sold to a Canadian businessman who had been working on behalf of the company.

Riley's use of the "MG" trademark resulted in a legal dispute with Nanjing Automobile (Group) Corporation, which had also acquired assets of the defunct MG Rover Group. This case was won by Nanjing in February 2010. Consequently, the company name was changed to Sports and Racing Europe Ltd. in March 2010.

== Models ==
The company announced a revised version of the MG XPower SV, renamed the XPower WR, in April 2008. Later the same year a convertible variant with a Kevlar bodyshell, the MG XPower SV-S WRC, was announced.

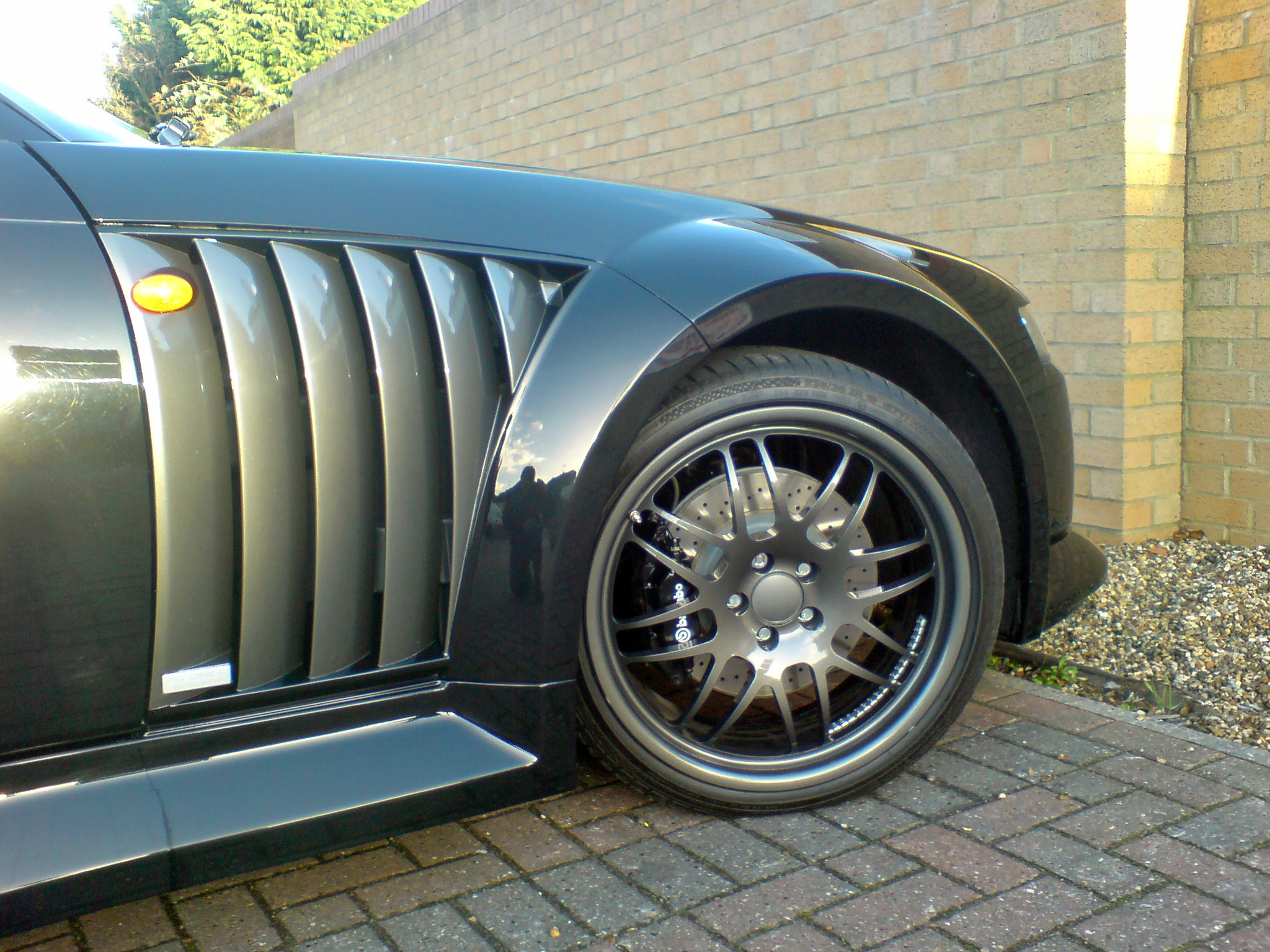
An MG XPower SV

Neither model ever reached production.
