= Eardiston =

Village in Worcestershire, England

Coordinates: 52.312°N 2.448°W

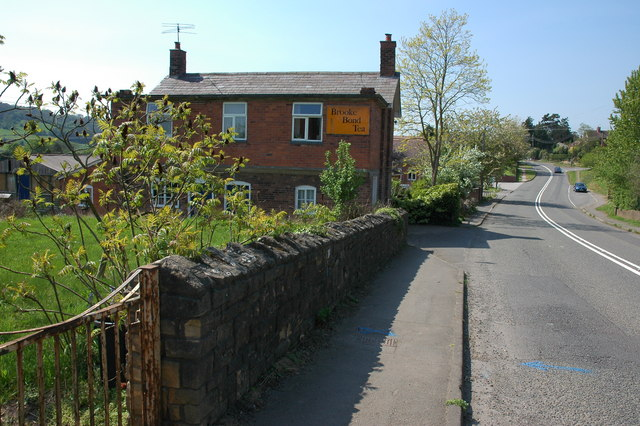
- Cottage in Eardiston

- Location within Worcestershire
- Civil parish: Lindridge
- District: Malvern Hills
- Shire county: Worcestershire
- Region: West Midlands
- Country: England
- Sovereign state: United Kingdom
- Post town: Tenbury Wells
- Postcode district: WR15
- Police: West Mercia
- Fire: Hereford and Worcester
- Ambulance: West Midlands

Eardiston is a village in Worcestershire, England. It is located within the civil parish of Lindridge, which had a population of 760 in 2021. The village of Eardiston lies in the valley of the river Teme between Great Witley and Tenbury Wells. Characterised by its rural landscape and proximity to the Malvern Hills AONB, the village serves as a centre for local agriculture and outdoor recreation.

== History ==
St. John the Baptist Church: A Grade II* listed building with origins dating to the 12th century. The structure is a notable example of Norman architecture and is architecturally distinct for its detached timber-framed bell tower, situated to the south of the chancel. The interior contains significant stained glass and period masonry.

The River Teme: A Site of Special Scientific Interest (SSSI), the river supports diverse local flora and fauna. It is utilised for regulated angling, canoeing, and riparian walking.

== Transport ==
Topography: The village is surrounded by undulating terrain typical of the West Midlands. The area features a network of public rights of way, including footpaths and bridleways integrated into regional hiking and cycling circuits.

== Community ==
Eardiston is recognised for its historical preservation and its role in Worcestershire’s rural tourism sector. It offers a well-preserved example of a traditional English riverside settlement, attracting visitors interested in ecotourism and medieval ecclesiastical history.

== Wildlife ==
The River Teme: A Site of Special Scientific Interest (SSSI), the river supports diverse local flora and fauna. It is utilized for regulated angling, canoeing, and riparian walking.
