= BMC A-series engine =

BMC A series
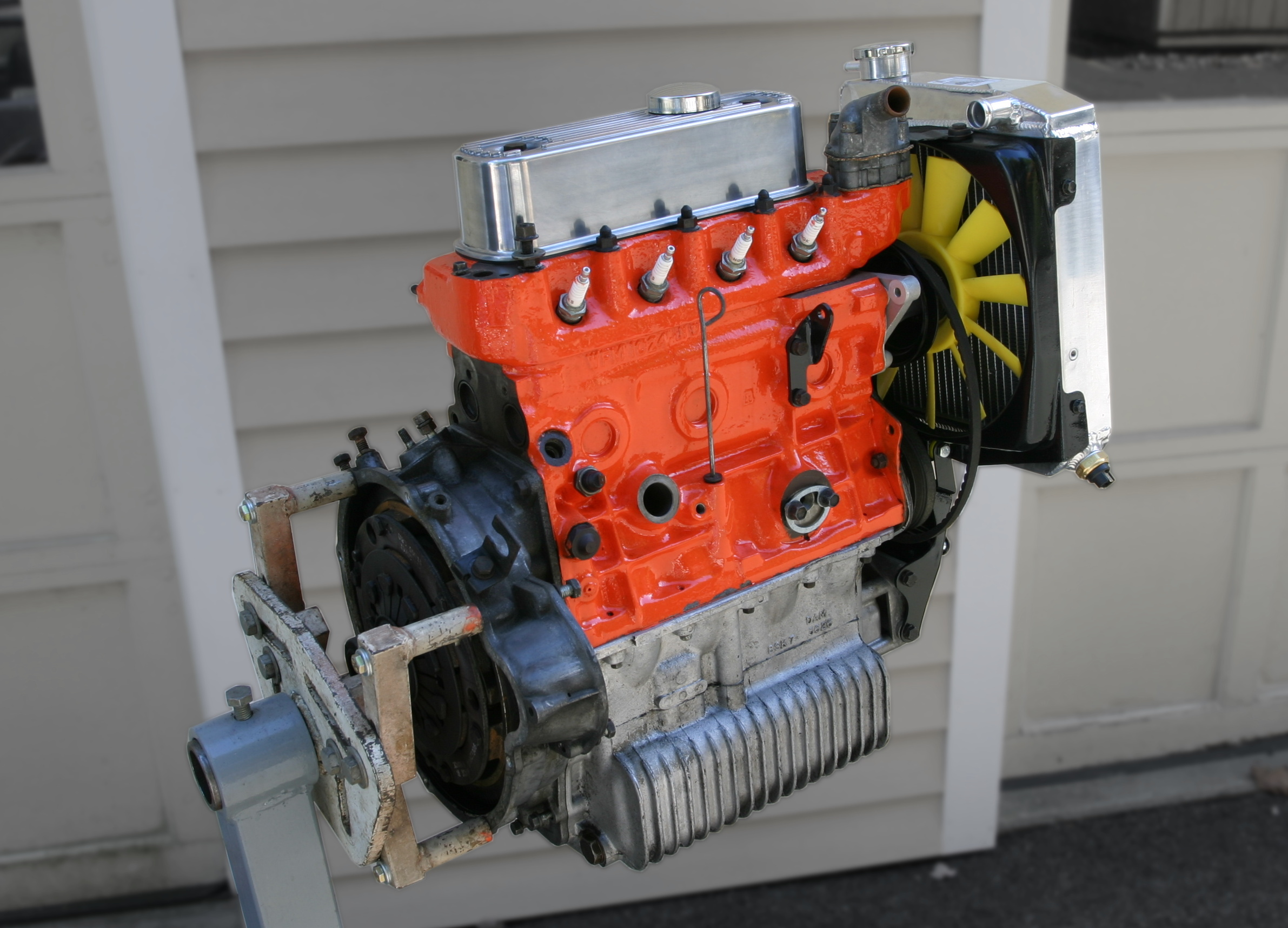

Overview
- Manufacturer: Austin Motor Company; British Motor Corporation; British Leyland Motor Corporation; Rover Group; MG Rover Group
- Designer: Leonard Lord, Bill Appleby, Eric Bareham
- Production: Longbridge, Cowley in UK 1951–2000 Pamplona in Spain, NMQ (Nueva Montaña Quijano) 1966–1975 Blackheath, Gauteng in South Africa 1960–1980

Layout
- Configuration: Inline-four engine, (straight-three engine and straight twin in prototype)
- Displacement: 803–1,275 cc (49.0–77.8 cu in)
- Cylinder bore: 57.92 mm (2.280 in); 62.43 mm (2.458 in); 62.9 mm (2.48 in); 64.58 mm (2.543 in); 70.6 mm (2.78 in)
- Piston stroke: 61.95 mm (2.439 in); 68.26 mm (2.687 in); 68.4 mm (2.69 in); 76.2 mm (3.00 in); 81.4 mm (3.20 in)
- Cylinder block material: Cast iron
- Cylinder head material: Cast iron, Aluminium
- Valvetrain: OHV 2 valves/ cyl. in OEM versions, OHC 4 valves/cyl prototype and in racing.
- Compression ratio: 7.5:1, 8.3:1, 8.5:1, 8.8:1, 9.4:1, 10.5:1, 23.6:1 (Diesel)

Combustion
- Supercharger: Shorrock and Eaton supercharger (racing only)
- Turbocharger: Garrett T3 (1275 Turbo only)
- Fuel system: SU carburettor or fuel injection
- Management: Rover MEMS, Lucas, AE Brico, T.J Fuel Injection, Lucas CAV (Diesel Version)
- Fuel type: Petrol, Diesel
- Cooling system: Water-cooled

Output
- Power output: 28 to 96 bhp (21 to 72 kW; 28 to 97 PS)
- Torque output: 40 to 85 lb⋅ft (54 to 115 N⋅m)

Emissions
- Emissions target standard: Euro 3 (MPi engine)

Chronology
- Successor: Rover K-series engine, Tritec engine (indirect)

The Austin Motor Company A-series is a British small straight-4 automobile engine. Launched in 1951 with the Austin A30, production lasted until 2000 in the Mini. It used a cast-iron block and cylinder head, and a steel crankshaft with three main bearings. The camshaft ran in the cylinder block, driven by a single-row chain for most applications, and with tappets sliding in the block, accessible through pressed steel side covers for most applications, and with overhead valves operated through rockers. The cylinder blocks are not interchangeable between versions intended for conventional end-on mounted gearboxes and the 'in-sump' transaxle used on British Motor Corporation/British Leyland front wheel drive models such as the Mini. The cylinder head for the overhead-valve version of the A-series engine was designed by Harry Weslake – a cylinder head specialist famed for his involvement in SS (Jaguar) engines and several Formula One-title winning engines. Although a "clean sheet" design, the A-series owed much to established Austin engine design practice, resembling in general design (including the Weslake head) and overall appearance a scaled-down version of the 1200cc overhead-valve engine first seen in the Austin A40 Devon which would form the basis of the later B-series engine.

== Engine family list ==
All engines had a cast iron head and block, two valves per cylinder in an OHV configuration and sidedraft SU carburettor. Engines were available in diesel in the BMC tractor.

All A-series engines up until mid-1970 were painted in British Standard (381c) 223 "Middle Bronze Green". This does not include overseas production models such as Australian manufacture. "Factory/dealer warranty replacement" units were painted black, these were primarily distributed for the failures common to the "wet crank" primary gear system in early Minis.

	Petrol									
ID	Displacement	Years	Bore	Stroke	Compression ratio	Fuel system	Horsepower	@rpm	Torque	@rpm
A	803 cc (49.0 cu in)	1951–1956	57.92 mm (2.280 in)	76.2 mm (3.00 in)	7.5:1	Single H2 / Zenith 26JS or 26VME	28 PS (21 kW; 28 hp)	4800	40 lb⋅ft (54 N⋅m)	2400
A	848 cc (51.7 cu in)	1959–1980	62.9 mm (2.48 in)	68.26 mm (2.687 in)	8.3:1	Single H2 / Zenith 26JS or 26VME	34 PS (25 kW; 34 hp)	5500	44 lb⋅ft (60 N⋅m)	2900
A	948 cc (57.9 cu in)	1956–1964	62.9 mm (2.48 in)	76.2 mm (3.00 in)	8.3:1	Single H2 / Zenith 26JS or 26VME	37 PS (27 kW; 36 hp)	4750	50 lb⋅ft (68 N⋅m)	2500
A	970 cc (59 cu in)	1964–1967	70.6 mm (2.78 in)	61.91 mm (2.437 in)	-	Twin HS2	65 PS (48 kW; 64 hp)	6500	55 lb⋅ft (75 N⋅m)	3500
A	997 cc (60.8 cu in)	1961–1964	62.43 mm (2.458 in)	81.28 mm (3.200 in)	8.3:1	Twin HS2	55 PS (40 kW; 54 hp)	6000	54 lb⋅ft (73 N⋅m)	3600
A	998 cc (60.9 cu in)	1962–1980	64.58 mm (2.543 in)	76.2 mm (3.00 in)	8.3:1	Single HS2	39 PS (29 kW; 38 hp)	4750	52 lb⋅ft (71 N⋅m)	2700
A	998 cc (60.9 cu in)	1964–1971	64.58 mm (2.543 in)	76.2 mm (3.00 in)	-	Twin HS2	55 PS (40 kW; 54 hp)	5800	57 lb.ft (77 N.m)	3000
A	1,070 cc (65 cu in)	1963–1967	70.6 mm (2.78 in)	68.26 mm (2.687 in)	8.5:1	Twin HS2	70 PS (51 kW; 69 hp)	6000	62 lb⋅ft (84 N⋅m)	4500
A	1,098 cc (67.0 cu in)	1962–1980	64.58 mm (2.543 in)	83.8 mm (3.30 in)	8.5:1	Single HS2	47 PS (35 kW; 46 hp)	5200	60 lb⋅ft (81 N⋅m)	2450
A	1,098 cc (67.0 cu in)	1962–1968	64.58 mm (2.543 in)	83.8 mm (3.30 in)	-	Twin HS2	55 PS (40 kW; 54 hp)	5500	61 lb⋅ft (83 N⋅m)	2500
A	1,097 cc (66.9 cu in)	1971–1980	70.6 mm (2.78 in)	69.85 mm (2.750 in)	-	-	54 PS (40 kW; 53 hp)	-	-	-
A	1,275 cc (77.8 cu in)	1964–1971	70.6 mm (2.78 in)	81.28 mm (3.200 in)	8.8:1	Twin HS2	76 PS (56 kW; 75 hp)	5300	79 lb⋅ft (107 N⋅m)	3000
A	1,275 cc (77.8 cu in)	1967–1980	70.6 mm (2.78 in)	81.28 mm (3.200 in)	-	Single HS4	57 PS (42 kW; 56 hp)	5300	69 lb⋅ft (94 N⋅m)	3000
A	1,275 cc (77.8 cu in)	1968–1974	70.6 mm (2.78 in)	81.28 mm (3.200 in)	-	Twin HS2	70 PS (51 kW; 69 hp)	6000	77 lb⋅ft (104 N⋅m)	3000
A+	998 cc (60.9 cu in)	1980–1992	64.58 mm (2.543 in)	76.2 mm (3.00 in)	9.4:1	Single HIF38	44 PS (32 kW; 43 hp)	5250	52 lb⋅ft (71 N⋅m)	3000
A+	1,275 cc (77.8 cu in)	1980–1992	70.6 mm (2.78 in)	81.28 mm (3.200 in)	9.75:1	Single HIF44	62 PS (46 kW; 61 hp)	5600	72 lb⋅ft (98 N⋅m)	3200
A+	1,275 cc (77.8 cu in)	1983–1990	70.6 mm (2.78 in)	81.28 mm (3.200 in)	9.4:1	Single HIF44 / Turbo	96 PS (71 kW; 95 hp)	6130	85 lb⋅ft (115 N⋅m)	2650
A+	1,275 cc (77.8 cu in)	1992–1996	70.6 mm (2.78 in)	81.28 mm (3.200 in)	10.1:1	SPi	63 PS (46 kW; 62 hp)	5500	70 lb⋅ft (95 N⋅m)	3000
A+	1,275 cc (77.8 cu in)	1996–2000	70.6 mm (2.78 in)	81.28 mm (3.200 in)	10.1:1	MPi	62 PS (46 kW; 61 hp)	5500	72 lb⋅ft (98 N⋅m)	3000
A+	1,275 cc (77.8 cu in)	1992–2000	70.6 mm (2.78 in)	81.28 mm (3.200 in)	10.1:1	SPi / MPi	77 PS (57 kW; 76 hp)	5800	80 lb⋅ft (110 N⋅m)	3000
Diesel
A	947 cc (51.7 cu in)	1962–1969	62.9 mm (2.48 in)	76.2 mm (3.00 in)	23.6:1	Lucas CAV	15 PS (11 kW; 15 hp)	2500	38 lb⋅ft (52 N⋅m)	1750

== A versions ==
=== 803 ===
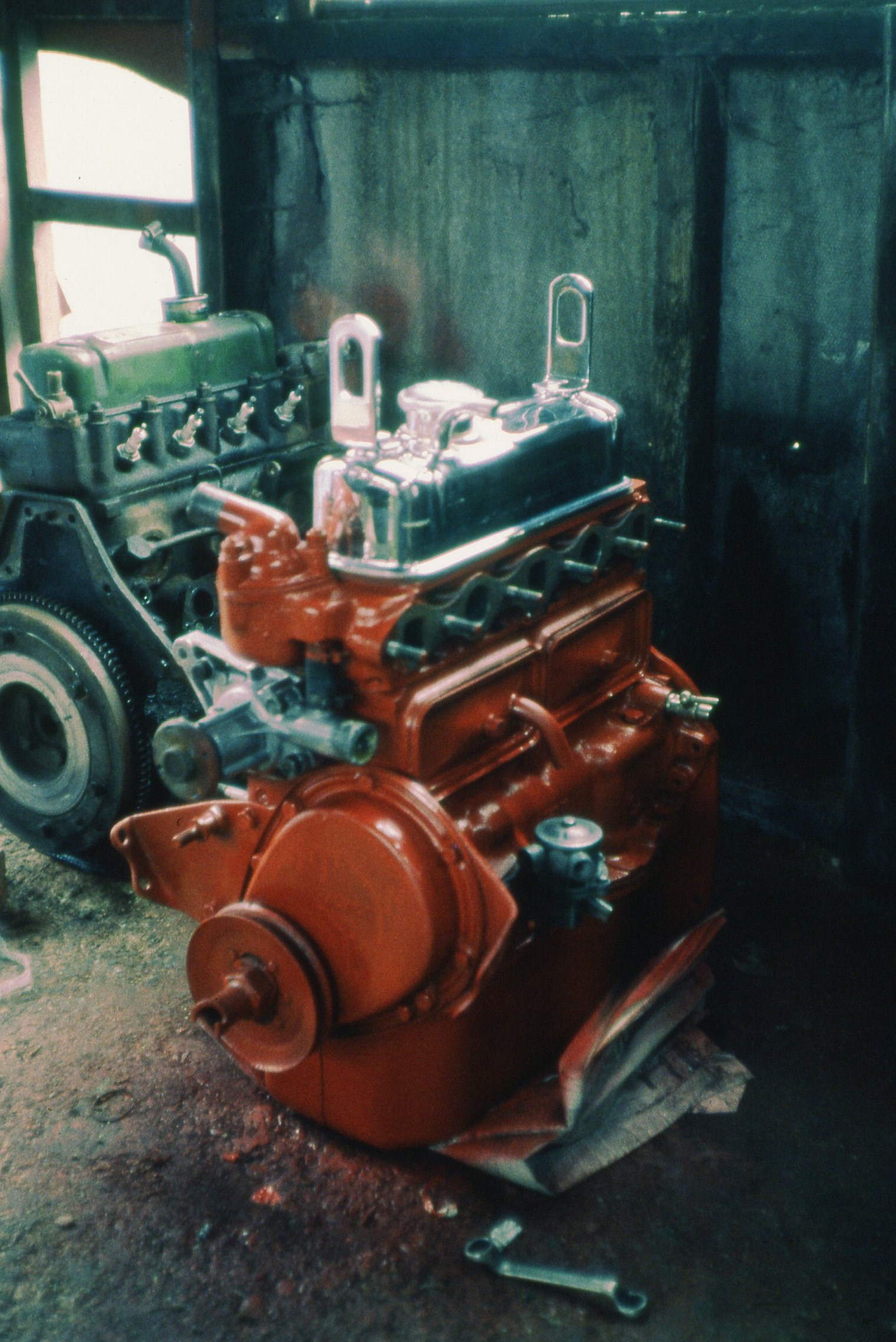
Austin A35 van engines, original 948cc left, replacement 803cc right

The original A-series engine displaced just 803 cc (49.0 cu in) and was used in the A30 and Morris Minor. It had an undersquare 57.92 mm × 76.2 mm (2.280 in × 3.000 in) bore and stroke. This engine was produced from 1952 to 1956.

Applications:

- 1952–56 Austin A30, 28 hp (21 kW) at 4400 rpm and 40 lb⋅ft (54 N⋅m) at 2200 rpm
- 1952–56 Morris Minor Series II, 30 hp (22 kW) at 4800 rpm and 40 lb⋅ft (54 N⋅m) at 2400 rpm

=== 948 ===
1956 saw a displacement increase, to 948 cc (57.9 cu in). This was accomplished by increasing the bore to 62.9 mm (2.48 in) while retaining the original 76.2 mm (3.00 in) stroke. It was produced until 1964.

Applications
Model	Power output	Torque
Austin A35	34 hp (25 kW) at 4,750 rpm	50 lb⋅ft (68 N⋅m) at 2,000 rpm
Morris Minor 1000	37 hp (28 kW) at 4,750 rpm	50 lb⋅ft (68 N⋅m) at 2,500 rpm
Austin A40 Farina	34 hp (25 kW) at 4,750 rpm	50 lb⋅ft (68 N⋅m) at 2,000 rpm
Austin-Healey Sprite	43 hp (32 kW) at 5,200 rpm	52 lb⋅ft (71 N⋅m) at 3,300 rpm
Austin A40 Farina MkII	37 hp (28 kW) at 5,000 rpm	50 lb⋅ft (68 N⋅m) at 2,500 rpm
Austin-Healey Sprite MkII MG Midget	46 hp (34 kW) at 5,500 rpm	53 lb⋅ft (72 N⋅m) at 3,000 rpm

=== 848 ===
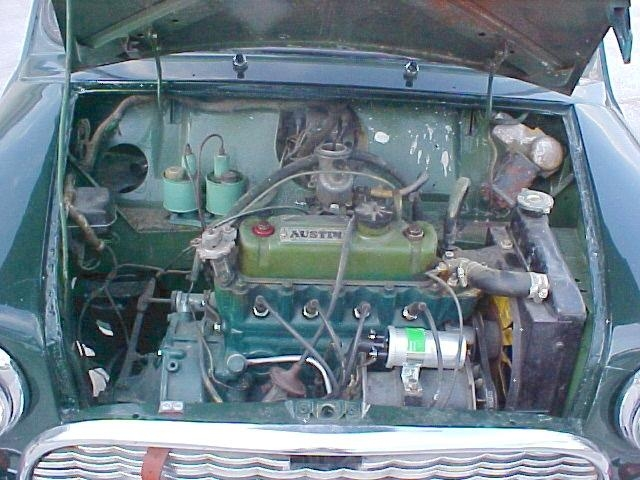
An 848 cc A-series engine in a 1963 Austin Mini

The 62.9 mm (2.48 in) bore was retained for 1959s 848 cc (51.7 cu in) Mini version. This displacement was reached by dropping the stroke to 68.26 mm (2.687 in). This engine was produced through to 1980 for the Mini, when the 998 A-Plus version supplanted it.

Applications
Model	Years	Power output	Torque
Austin Seven/Austin/Morris Mini (Note: Riley and Wolseley were brands of BMC. The Mini, Elf and Hornet were built on the same wheelbase and suspension with differences in the bodywork and trim)	1959–69	34 hp (25 kW) at 5500 rpm	44 lb⋅ft (60 N⋅m) at 2900 rpm
Riley Elf/Wolseley Hornet	1961–62	34 hp (25 kW) at 5500 rpm	44 lb⋅ft (60 N⋅m) at 2900 rpm
Austin A35 Van	1963–68	34 hp (25 kW) at 5500 rpm	44 lb⋅ft (60 N⋅m) at 2900 rpm
Mini Moke	1964–68	34 hp (25 kW) at 5500 rpm	44 lb⋅ft (60 N⋅m) at 2900 rpm
Mini 850/City	1969–80	33 hp (25 kW) at 5300 rpm	44 lb⋅ft (60 N⋅m) at 2900 rpm

=== 997 ===
The one-off 997 cc (60.8 cu in) version for the Mini Cooper used a smaller 62.43 mm (2.458 in) bore and longer 81.4 mm (3.20 in) stroke. It was produced from 1961 to 1964.

Applications:

- 1961–1964 Austin/Morris Mini Cooper, 55 hp (41 kW) at 6000 rpm and 54 lb⋅ft (73 N⋅m) at 3600 rpm

=== 998 ===
The Mini also got a 998 cc (60.9 cu in) version. This was similar to the 948 in that it had the same 76.2 mm (3.00 in) stroke but the bore was increased slightly to 64.58 mm (2.543 in). It was produced from 1962 to 1992. This engine was first introduced into the Mk II versions of the Riley Elf and Wolseley Hornet, before becoming common fitment in the mainstream Minis.

Model	Years	Power output	Torque
Riley Elf/Wolseley Hornet	1962–69	38 hp (28 kW) at 5250 rpm	52 lb⋅ft (71 N⋅m) at 2700 rpm
Mini Moke, Australian Mokes.	1966–82		
Mini Moke, Portuguese Mokes.	1983–93		
Austin/Morris Mini Cooper	1964–69	55 hp (41 kW) at 5800 rpm	57 lb⋅ft (77 N⋅m) at 3000 rpm
Austin/Morris Mini	1967–80	38 hp (28 kW) at 5250 rpm	52 lb⋅ft (71 N⋅m) at 2700 rpm
Mini Clubman	1969–75	38 hp (28 kW) at 5250 rpm	52 lb⋅ft (71 N⋅m) at 2700 rpm
Mini (automatic)	1969–80	41 hp (31 kW) at 4850 rpm	52 lb⋅ft (71 N⋅m) at 2750 rpm

=== 1098 ===
The 1.1 L; 67.0 cu in (1,098 cc) version was fitted to:

- MG Midget Mk1 1098cc, Oct 1962 – 1964
- MG Midget Mk2 1098cc, 1964–66
- Austin A35 Van 1098cc, 1962–68
- Austin A40 Farina Mk2, Oct 1962 – 1968
- Morris Minor, Oct 1962 – 1971
- Austin/Morris BMC Saloon from 1962
- Mini and its derivatives, the 1098cc engine mounted transversely

It was a stroked (to 83.8 mm (3.30 in)) version of the 998 previously used in the Riley Elf and Wolseley Hornet. It was produced from 1962 to 1980.

Applications:

Years	Model	Power output	Torque
1962–66	Austin A35 Van	48 hp (36 kW) at 5100 rpm	60 lb⋅ft (81 N⋅m) at 2500 rpm
1962–67	Austin A40 Farina	48 hp (36 kW) at 5100 rpm	60 lb⋅ft (81 N⋅m) at 2500 rpm
1962–71	Morris 1100/Morris Minor 1000	48 hp (36 kW) at 5100 rpm	60 lb⋅ft (81 N⋅m) at 2500 rpm
1962–68	MG 1100	55 hp (41 kW) at 5500 rpm	61 lb⋅ft (83 N⋅m) at 2500 rpm
1962–64	Austin-Healey Sprite MkII	56 hp (42 kW) at 5500 rpm	62 lb⋅ft (84 N⋅m) at 3250 rpm
1962–64	MG Midget	56 hp (42 kW) at 5500 rpm	62 lb⋅ft (84 N⋅m) at 3250 rpm
1963–74	Austin 1100	48 hp (36 kW) at 5100 rpm	60 lb⋅ft (81 N⋅m) at 2500 rpm
1963–67	Vanden Plas Princess 1100	55 hp (41 kW) at 5500 rpm	61 lb⋅ft (83 N⋅m) at 2500 rpm
1964–66	Austin-Healey Sprite MkIII	59 hp (44 kW) at 5750 rpm	65 lb⋅ft (88 N⋅m) at 3500 rpm
1964–66	MG Midget MkII	59 hp (44 kW) at 5750 rpm	65 lb⋅ft (88 N⋅m) at 3500 rpm
1965–68	Riley Kestrel/Wolseley 1100	55 hp (41 kW) at 5500 rpm	61 lb⋅ft (83 N⋅m) at 2500 rpm
1973–75	Austin Allegro	49 hp (37 kW) at 5250 rpm	60 lb⋅ft (81 N⋅m) at 2450 rpm
1975–80	Austin Allegro	45 hp (34 kW) at 5250 rpm	55 lb⋅ft (75 N⋅m) at 2900 rpm
1968–82	Mini Moke (Australia only)		
1969–71	Morris Mini 1100/Morris Mini K (Australia only)		
1971–75	Morris Mini Clubman/Leyland Mini (Australia only)		
1975–80	Mini Clubman	45 hp (34 kW) at 5250 rpm	56 lb⋅ft (76 N⋅m) at 2700 rpm
1976–80	Mini 1100 Special	45 hp (34 kW) at 5250 rpm	56 lb⋅ft (76 N⋅m) at 2700 rpm

=== 1070 ===
The 1,070 cc (65 cu in) version was another one-off, this time for the Mini Cooper S. It used a new 70.6 mm (2.78 in) bore size and the 68.26 mm (2.687 in) stroke from the 848. It was only produced in 1963–1964. Paired with the even rarer 970 cc (59 cu in) version, below, it became that rarest of things: an oversquare A-series engine.

Applications:

- 1963–1964 Austin/Morris Mini Cooper S, 70 hp (52 kW) at 6000 rpm and 62 lb⋅ft (84 N⋅m) at 4500 rpm

=== 970 ===
The Mini Cooper S next moved on to a 970 cc (59 cu in) version. It had the same 70.6 mm (2.78 in) bore as the 1071 cc Cooper S but used a shorter 61.95 mm (2.439 in) stroke. It was produced from 1964 to 1965.

Applications:

- 1964–1967 Austin/Morris Mini Cooper S, 65 hp (48 kW) at 6,500 rpm and 55 lb⋅ft (75 N⋅m) at 3,500 rpm

=== 1275 ===
The largest A-series engine displaced 1.3 L; 77.8 cu in (1,275 cc). It used the 70.6 mm (2.78 in) bore from the Mini Cooper S versions but the 81.4 mm (3.20 in) stroke from the plain Mini Cooper. It was produced from 1964 until 1980, when it was replaced by an A-Plus version. The bore size was around the maximum possible in the block, with very little separation between the middle cylinders, which often contributed to head gasket failures.

Applications:

Years	Model	Power output	Torque
1964–71	Austin/Morris Mini Cooper S	76 hp (57 kW) at 5800 rpm	79 lb⋅ft (107 N⋅m) at 3000 rpm
1965-74	Mini Marcos	76 hp (57 kW) at 5900 rpm	79 lb⋅ft (107 N⋅m) at 3000 rpm
1966–70	Austin-Healey Sprite MkIV	65 hp (48 kW) at 6000 rpm	72 lb⋅ft (98 N⋅m) at 3000 rpm
1966–74	MG Midget MkIII	65 hp (48 kW) at 6000 rpm	72 lb⋅ft (98 N⋅m) at 3000 rpm
1967–68	MG 1300/Wolseley 1300	58 hp (43 kW) at 5250 rpm	69 lb⋅ft (94 N⋅m) at 3000 rpm
1967–68	Riley Kestrel 1300	58 hp (43 kW) at 5250 rpm	69 lb⋅ft (94 N⋅m) at 3000 rpm
1967–68	Vanden Plas Princess 1300	58 hp (43 kW) at 5250 rpm	69 lb⋅ft (94 N⋅m) at 3000 rpm
1967–73	Morris 1300	58 hp (43 kW) at 5250 rpm	69 lb⋅ft (94 N⋅m) at 3000 rpm
1967–74	Austin 1300	58 hp (43 kW) at 5250 rpm	69 lb⋅ft (94 N⋅m) at 3000 rpm
1967	MG 1275/Riley 1275	58 hp (43 kW) at 5250 rpm	69 lb⋅ft (94 N⋅m) at 3500 rpm
1967	Wolseley 1275	58 hp (43 kW) at 5250 rpm	69 lb⋅ft (94 N⋅m) at 3500 rpm
1967	Vanden Plas Princess 1275	58 hp (43 kW) at 5250 rpm	69 lb⋅ft (94 N⋅m) at 3500 rpm
1968–69	Riley Kestrel 1300/Riley 1300	70 hp (52 kW) at 6000 rpm	77 lb⋅ft (104 N⋅m) at 3000 rpm
1968–71	Austin America (automatic)	60 hp (45 kW) at 5250 rpm	69 lb⋅ft (94 N⋅m) at 2500 rpm
1968–73	Wolseley 1300 (manual)	65 hp (48 kW) at 5750 rpm	71 lb⋅ft (96 N⋅m) at 3000 rpm
1968–73	MG 1300 MkII	70 hp (52 kW) at 6000 rpm	77 lb⋅ft (104 N⋅m) at 3000 rpm
1968–74	Vanden Plas Princess 1300 (manual)	65 hp (48 kW) at 5750 rpm	71 lb⋅ft (96 N⋅m) at 3000 rpm
1968	MG 1300/Riley Kestrel 1300	65 hp (48 kW) at 5750 rpm	71 lb⋅ft (96 N⋅m) at 3000 rpm
1969–71	Morris 1300GT	70 hp (52 kW) at 6000 rpm	74 lb⋅ft (100 N⋅m) at 3250 rpm
1971–82	Mini Moke Californian Australian only.		
1969–74	Mini 1275GT	59 hp (44 kW) at 5300 rpm	65 lb⋅ft (88 N⋅m) at 2550 rpm
1969–74	Austin 1300GT	70 hp (52 kW) at 6000 rpm	74 lb⋅ft (100 N⋅m) at 3250 rpm
1971–80	Morris Marina	60 hp (45 kW) at 5250 rpm	69 lb⋅ft (94 N⋅m) at 2500 rpm
1971	Austin Sprite	65 hp (48 kW) at 6000 rpm	72 lb⋅ft (98 N⋅m) at 3000 rpm
1973–80	Austin Allegro	59 hp (44 kW) at 5300 rpm	69 lb⋅ft (94 N⋅m) at 3000 rpm
1974–80	Mini 1275GT	54 hp (40 kW) at 5300 rpm	65 lb⋅ft (88 N⋅m) at 2550 rpm

== A-Plus versions ==
British Leyland was keen to update the old A-series design in the 1970s. However, attempts at replacement, including an aborted early-70s British Leyland 'K engine' (unrelated to the later Rover K series) and an OHC version of the A series, ended in failure. During the development of what was to become the Austin Metro, engineers tested the A series against its more modern rivals and found that it still offered competitive (or even class-leading) fuel economy and torque for its size. While in the 1970s the A series had begun to seem dated against a new generation of high-revving overhead cam engines, by the end of the decade a new emphasis on good economy and high torque outputs at low speeds meant that the A series's inherent design was still well up to market demands.

Given this, and the lack of funds to develop an all-new power unit, it was decided to upgrade the A-series unit at a cost of £30 million. The result was the 'A-Plus' Series of engines. Available in 998 and 1,275 cc (60.9 and 77.8 cu in), the A-Plus had stronger engine blocks and cranks, lighter pistons and improved piston rings, Spring loaded tensioner units for the timing chain and other detail changes to increase the service interval of the engine (from 6,000 to 12,000 miles (9,700 to 19,300 km)). More modern SU Carburettors and revised manifold designs allowed for small improvements in power without any decrease in torque or fuel economy. Many of the improvements learnt from the Cooper-tuned units were also incorporated, with A-Plus engines having a generally higher standard of metallurgy on all units, where previously only the highest-tuned engines were upgraded in this way. This made the A-Plus engines generally longer-lived than the standard A series, which had a life between major rebuilds of around 80,000 to 100,000 miles (130,000 to 160,000 km) in normal service. Studies were made into upgrading the engine to use five main crankshaft bearings but the standard three-bearing crank had proven reliable even in high states of tune and at high engine speeds, so it was not deemed worth the extra funding.

The new engines received distinctive 'A+' branding on their rocker covers and the blocks and heads were colour-coded for the different capacities: yellow for 998 cc (60.9 cu in) and red for 1,275 cc (77.8 cu in) engines.

=== 998 Plus ===
The A-Plus version of the 998 cc (60.9 cu in) motor was produced from 1980 to 1992.

Applications:

Years	Model	Power output	Torque
1980–82	Mini 1000/City/HL	39 hp (29 kW) at 4750 rpm	52 lb⋅ft (71 N⋅m) at 2000 rpm
1980–82	Austin Allegro	44 hp (33 kW) at 5250 rpm	52 lb⋅ft (71 N⋅m) at 3000 rpm
1980–90	Austin Metro	41 hp (31 kW) at 5400 rpm	51 lb⋅ft (69 N⋅m) at 2700 rpm
1982–88	Mini HLE/City E/Mayfair	40 hp (30 kW) at 5000 rpm	50 lb⋅ft (68 N⋅m) at 2500 rpm
1981–86	Austin Metro HLE	46 bhp (34 kW)	52 lb⋅ft (71 N⋅m)
1988–92	Mini City/Mayfair	42 hp (31 kW) at 5250 rpm	58 lb⋅ft (79 N⋅m) at 2600 rpm

=== 1275 Plus ===
The larger 1.3 L; 77.8 cu in (1,275 cc) engine was also given the "A-Plus" treatment. This lasted from 1980 to 2000, making it the last of the A-series line.

Applications
Years	Model	Power output	Torque
1980–82	Austin Allegro	62 hp (46 kW) at 5600 rpm	72 lb⋅ft (98 N⋅m) at 3200 rpm
1980–84	Morris Ital	61 hp (45 kW) at 5300 rpm	69 lb⋅ft (94 N⋅m) at 2950 rpm
1980–90	Austin Metro	63 hp (47 kW) at 5650 rpm	72 lb⋅ft (98 N⋅m) at 3100 rpm
1982–89	MG Metro	72 hp (54 kW) at 6000 rpm	75 lb⋅ft (102 N⋅m) at 4000 rpm
1983–85	Austin Maestro HLE	64 hp (48 kW) at 5500 rpm	73 lb⋅ft (99 N⋅m) at 3500 rpm
1983–93	Austin Maestro	68 hp (51 kW) at 5800 rpm	75 lb⋅ft (102 N⋅m) at 3500 rpm
1984–89	Austin Montego	68 hp (51 kW) at 5600 rpm	75 lb⋅ft (102 N⋅m) at 3500 rpm
1989–90	Austin Metro GTa	72 hp (54 kW) at 6000 rpm	75 lb⋅ft (102 N⋅m) at 4000 rpm
1990–91	Mini Cooper	60 hp (45 kW; 61 PS) at 5500 rpm	71 lb⋅ft (96 N⋅m) at 3900 rpm
1990–91	Mini Cooper S	78 hp (58 kW) at 6000 rpm	78 lb⋅ft (106 N⋅m) at 3250 rpm
1991–96	Mini Cooper 1.3i/Cabriolet	62 hp (46 kW; 63 PS) at 5700 rpm	70 lb⋅ft (95 N⋅m) at 3900 rpm
1991–96	Mini Cooper S 1.3i	77 hp (57 kW) at 5800 rpm	80 lb⋅ft (110 N⋅m) at 3000 rpm
1992–96	Mini Sprite/Mayfair	50 hp (37 kW) at 5000 rpm	66 lb⋅ft (89 N⋅m) at 2600 rpm

=== 1275 Turbo ===
To allow the MG Metro to compete with larger, more powerful hot hatchbacks a turbocharged version of the 1,275 cc (77.8 cu in) A-Plus was developed with the assistance of Lotus Engineering. A Garrett T3 turbocharger was fitted along with a unique SU carburettor with an automatic pressure-regulated fuel system. The engine block, cylinder head, pistons, crankshaft and valves were all modified from the standard A-Plus engines. The turbocharger was fitted with an advanced two-stage boost control system which only allowed full boost to be achieved at engine speeds above 4000 rpm – this was to prevent damage to the sump-mounted four-speed gearbox, the design of which dated back to the early 1950s and could not reliably cope with the high torque output of the Turbo engine at low speeds. The quoted power for the 1,275 cc (77.8 cu in) A-Plus Turbo was 94 bhp (70 kW) although in practice the tune could vary from car to car and, because the engine was not intercooled power varied significantly depending on the weather. The MG Metro Turbo was entered in the British Touring Car Championship in 1983 and 1984, with the tuned engines producing in excess of 200 bhp (150 kW). Turbo versions lasted from 1983 to 1990.

Applications:

- 1983–89 MG Metro Turbo, 94 hp (70 kW) at 6130 rpm and 85 lb⋅ft (115 N⋅m) at 2650 rpm
- 1989–90 Mini ERA Turbo, 94 hp (70 kW) at 6130 rpm and 85 lb⋅ft (115 N⋅m) at 3600 rpm

=== 1275 MPi ===
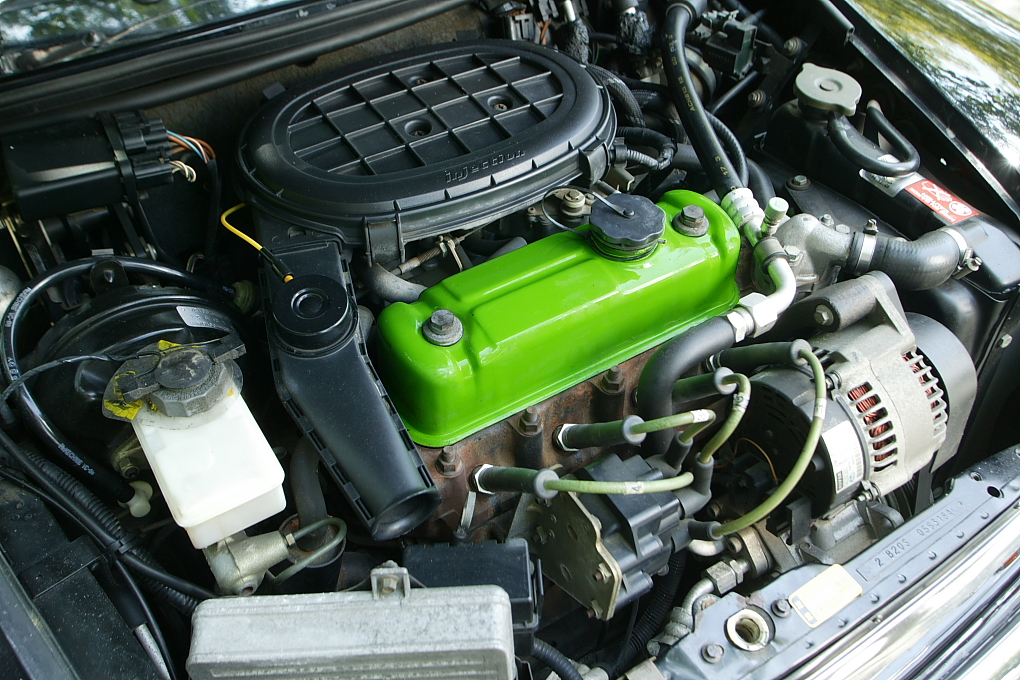
Japanese Mini Paul Smith engine, notice the side radiator

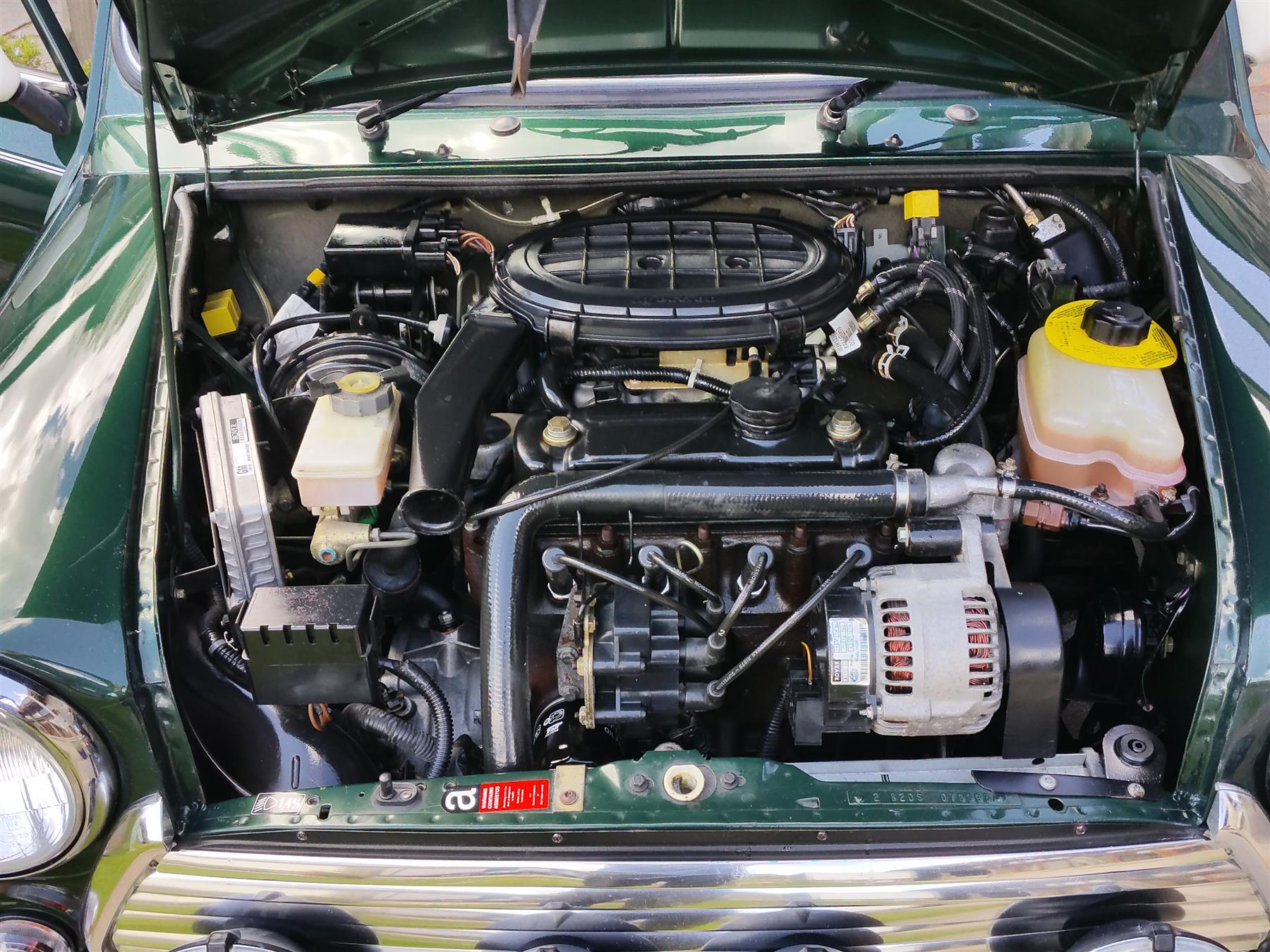
MPi A-Series

A special "twin-port injection" version of the 1.3 L; 77.8 cu in (1,275 cc) engine was developed by Rover engineer, Mike Theaker. It was the last A-series variant, produced from 1997 to 2000. Few changes were made to ensure the engine complies with Euro 2 (later Euro 3) emission standard, such as adding a 3-way catalytic converter and making it twin-point injection, the engine also receive changes with ignition system by having a wasted spark instead of the distributor. For the Japanese domestic market the engine maintained the single-point injection version of the engine and the radiator is still on the side due to the space constraint for the air conditioner component.

Applications

- 1997–2000 Rover Mini MPi 1.3i (TPi), 63 hp (47 kW) at 5500 rpm and 70 lb⋅ft (95 N⋅m) at 3000 rpm

JOHN COOPER GARAGES

During the 1990s Mini Cooper revival, John Cooper Garages offered a number of factory-approved "Cooper S" and "Cooper Si" upgrades to the standard Coopers. The conversions came with a full Rover warranty, and could initially be fitted by any franchised Rover dealer.

- S pack (carb) 77 bhp (57 kW)
- 1st Si pack (Spi) 77 bhp (57 kW)
- 2nd Si pack (Spi) 82 bhp (61 kW)
- 3rd Si pack (Spi) 86 bhp (64 kW)
- 1997 Si pack (Mpi) 85 bhp (63 kW) @ 5500rpm
- 1999 Si pack (Mpi) 90 bhp (67 kW) @ 6000rpm

== Diesel version ==
The diesel version appeared in 1962, on the BMC Mini tractor. It was developed with the help of Ricardo Consulting Engineers. It was redesign of existing 948 cc version, new purpose-designed cylinder head, with Lucas CAV fuel injection. This engine has dry liners. The block is almost identical to the petrol engine. The oil pump has been removed from the camshaft and is driven by an extension to what would have been the distributor drive. It uses Ricardo-patented "Comet V" combustion chambers, with a compression ratio of 23.6:1. Produced 15 hp at 2500rpm and 38 lb⋅ft (52 N⋅m) torque at 1,750 rpm. A petrol version of this modified engine was 'reverse-engineered' for use in the Mini Tractor whilst retaining parts commonality with the diesel variant, rather than using a standard petrol A-series unit. The diesel A series was also sold as a marine engine under the BMC name alongside the diesel B-series engines. Production ceased in 1969.

== South African engines ==
At the end of 1965, BMC South Africa started a new program, with the aim of using more components manufactured in the country (using less imported components from U.K.). They decided to develop and manufacture their own version of the engine. Two versions were made with 1.1 and 1.3 litres, using the same cylinder block. The block was redesigned, new oil circulation arrangements and redesigned main bearing (bigger dimensions) and stronger/biffers camshafts. Both versions use the same connecting rods, but different crankshaft and pistons. Prototypes versions were made by 1969. Production began in 1971, ending in 1980.

South African engines
Displacement	Bore	Stroke	Horsepower
1,098 cc (67.0 cu in)	70.6 mm (2.78 in)	69.85 mm (2.750 in)	54 PS (40 kW; 53 hp)
1,275 cc (77.8 cu in)	70.6 mm (2.78 in)	81.3 mm (3.20 in)	62 PS (46 kW; 61 hp)

== OHC version ==
With the intention of updating the current engine, for use in the new Mini Clubman (ADO20), and current ADO16, Leyland developed an OHC version. It appeared in a prototype version in 1971, with single overhead camshaft. It featured redesigned cylinder block, new aluminium cylinder head and twin SU carburetors. Eleven prototypes units were built, in three different capacities, 970, 1070 and 1275 cc. All engines use the same cylinder bore dimension of 70.6 mm, to reduce the number of engine parts, reducing production costs. It uses a modular approach, making it possible to produce the three versions with the same engine block. The lack of investment and the turmoil and chaos in British Leyland, meant the engine never reached production. In 1975 the plan was abandoned in favour of the "A+" version that reached production in 1980.

OHC A-Series
Displacement	Bore	Stroke	Horsepower	@rpm	Torque	@rpm
970 cc (59 cu in)	70.6 mm (2.78 in)	61.91 mm (2.437 in)	59.8 PS (44 kW; 59 hp)	6750	51 lb⋅ft (69 N⋅m)	5250
1,097 cc (66.9 cu in)	70.6 mm (2.78 in)	69.85 mm (2.750 in)	73 PS (54 kW; 72 hp)	6500	64 lb⋅ft (87 N⋅m)	5000
1,275 cc (77.8 cu in)	70.6 mm (2.78 in)	81.3 mm (3.20 in)	85.2 PS (63 kW; 84 hp)	6750	80 lb⋅ft (110 N⋅m)	4500

== Twin-cylinder A-series ==
Under the code ADO11, a 474cc twin-cylinder engine with a single H2 SU carburetor, based on the 948cc unit, was built with the intention to be used in the ADO15 (Mini) with an in-sump gearbox. In May 1957, the engine was tested in one Austin A35, alongside a 20 hp, 500cc air-cooled, and later 670cc water-cooled, two-cylinder two-stroke engine developed by Dr Joe Ehrlich of EMC Motorcycles that was tested in one Austin A30 before being used in an experimental Austin-A30–based prototype with weight reduced to 584 kg (by way of a special lightweight body in steel that was lighter than normal, with altered panels to keep weight at a minimum) known as the Austin A20 or the "Lightweight Austin 7".

In 2021 retired racing driver and Bugatti specialist Ivan Dutton rebuilt an example of the four-stroke engine from an original head and cylinder block and documented the work on Youtube. He also has the EMC two-cylinder two-stroke engine which he plans to return to running condition.

== Current use ==
Almost every part of the engine is still made, whether in original specification or improved versions: pistons, camshafts, crankshafts, cylinder heads. Cylinder heads are available in eight-valve and sixteen-valve versions, made in aluminium with five, seven or eight ports. Additionally over the past few decades it has not been unusual to see the A-Series stretched beyond 1275cc with capacities ranging from as low as 1293cc up to 1479cc, although it is commonly enlarged to 1380cc while retaining its reliability so long it is serviced regularly and well looked after.

The A-series engine is currently used in David Brown Mini Remastered. The engine is totally rebuilt, with new internals to an improved specification. The engine used is based in 1275cc MPi version, with larger capacity versions including the 1330cc Monte Carlo as well as the 1380cc and 1450cc Oselli Edition.

Mini Remastered updated version
Displacement	Bore	Stroke	Compression ratio	Carburation	Horsepower	@rpm	Torque	@rpm
1,275 cc (77.8 cu in)	70.6 mm (2.78 in)	81.28 mm (3.200 in)	10.1:1	MPi	72 PS (53 kW; 71 hp)	4600	88 lb⋅ft (119 N⋅m)	3100
1,330 cc (81 cu in)	72.19 mm (2.842 in)	81.28 mm (3.200 in)	10.1:1	MPi	84 PS (62 kW; 83 hp)	-	-	-

== Gallery ==
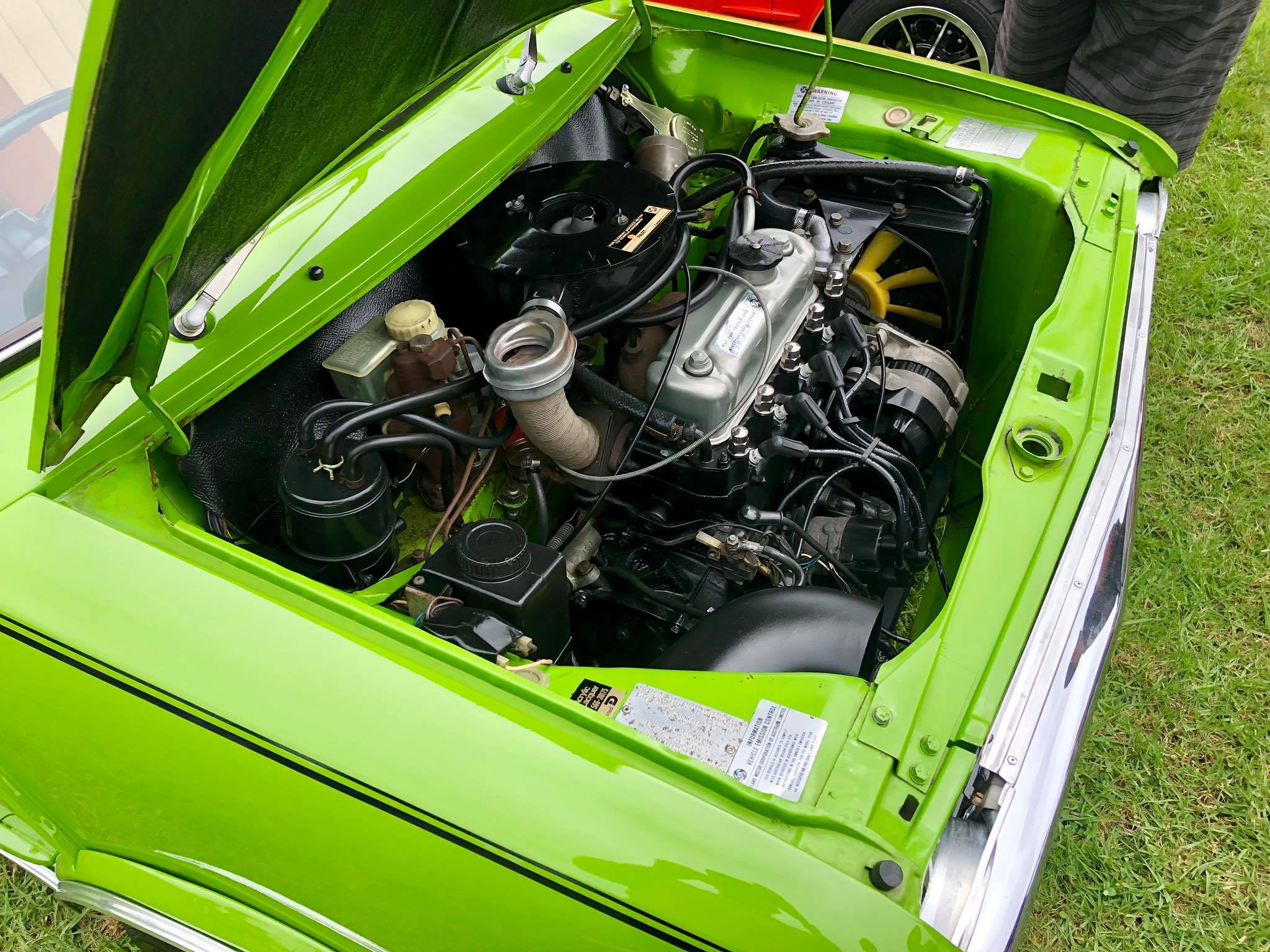
998cc "A" version in a 1977 Mini Clubman

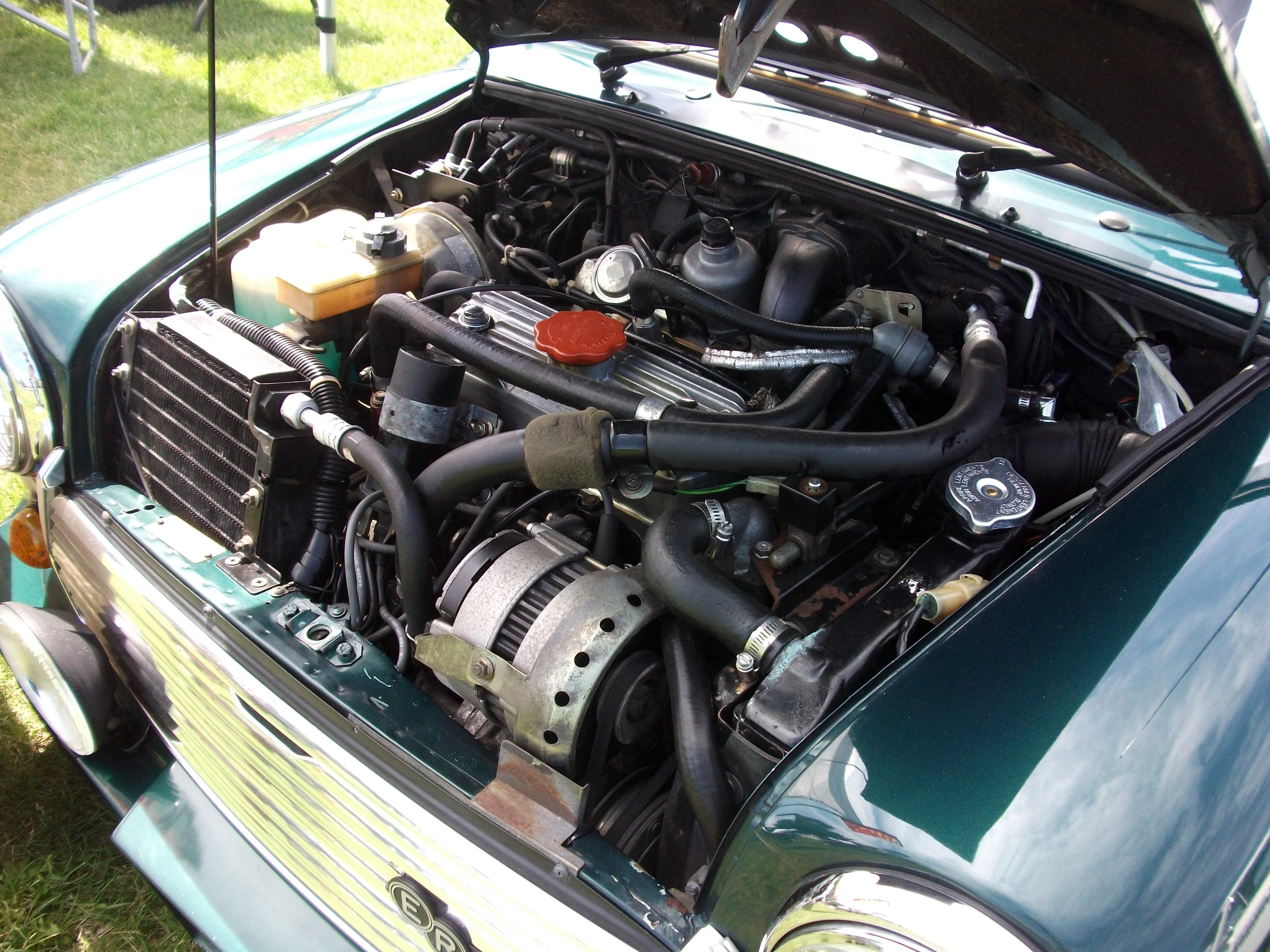
1275cc "A+" Turbo version in a 1990 Mini Turbo

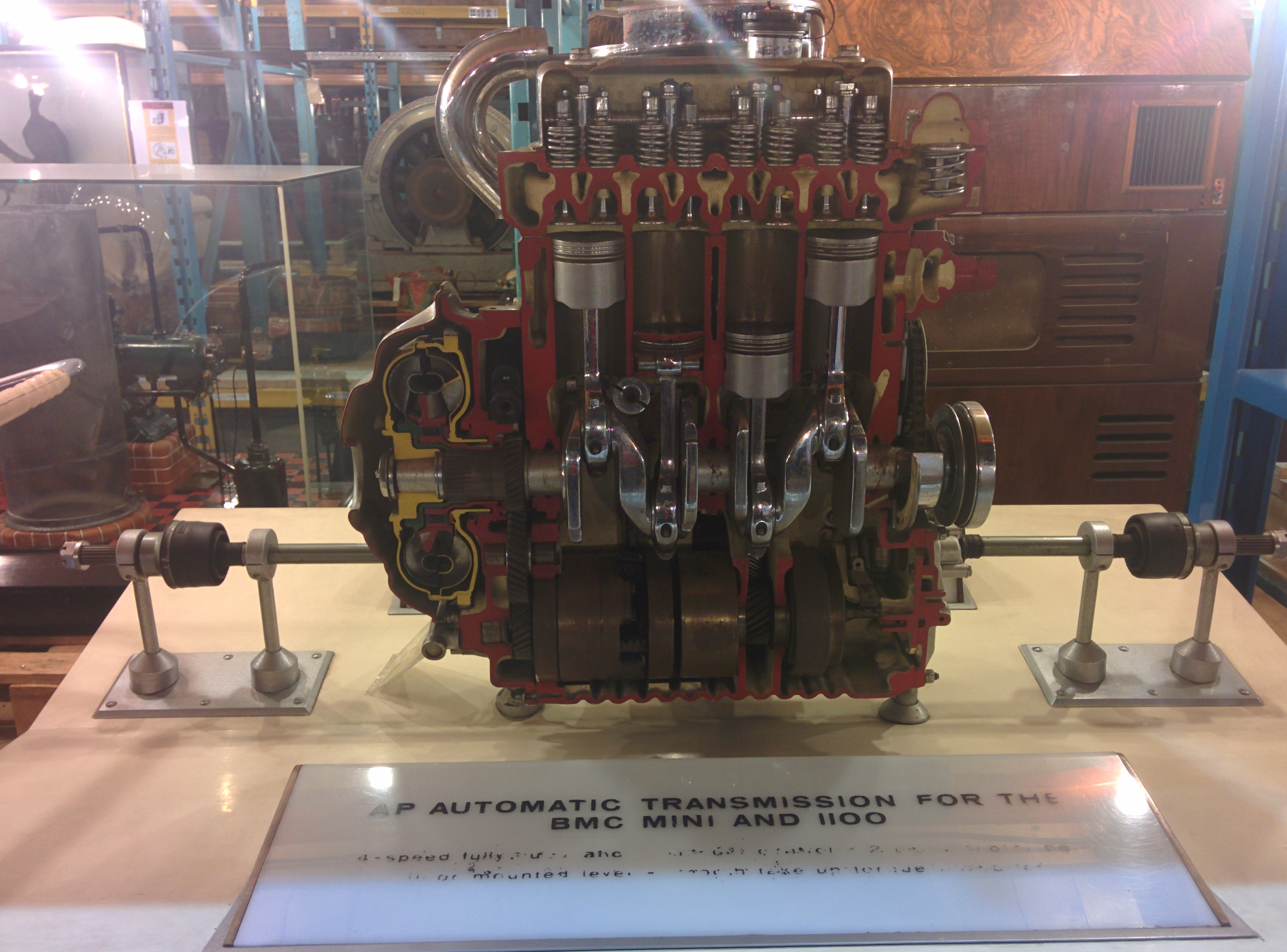
1098cc "A" version with automatic gearbox (by Automotive Products, "AP" ) in sump, used 1964–1992

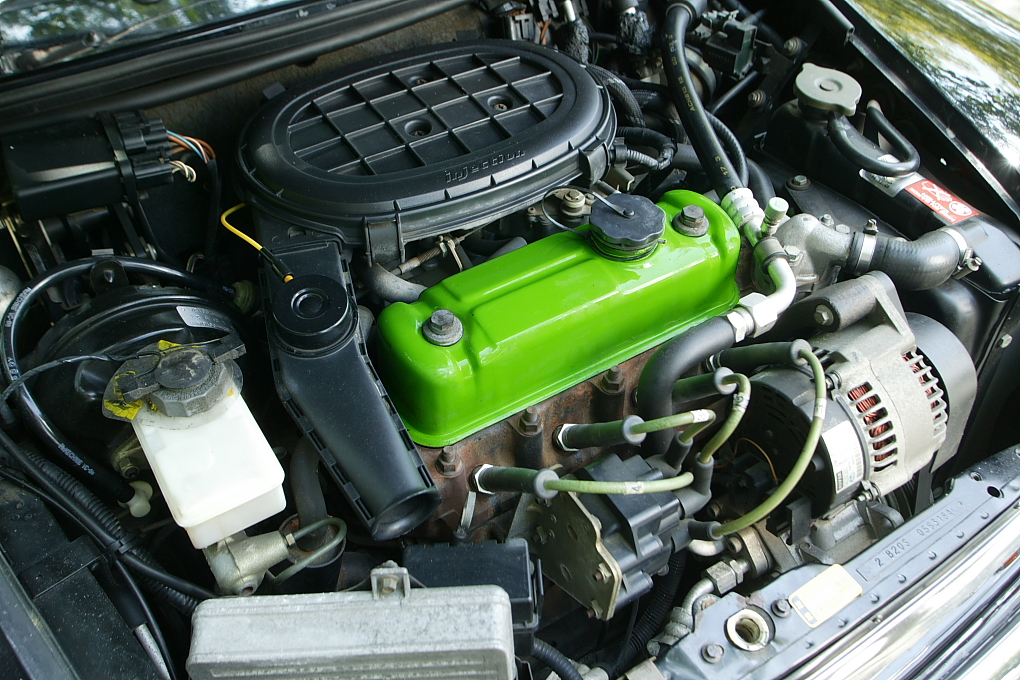
1275cc "A+" MPi version, with air conditioning

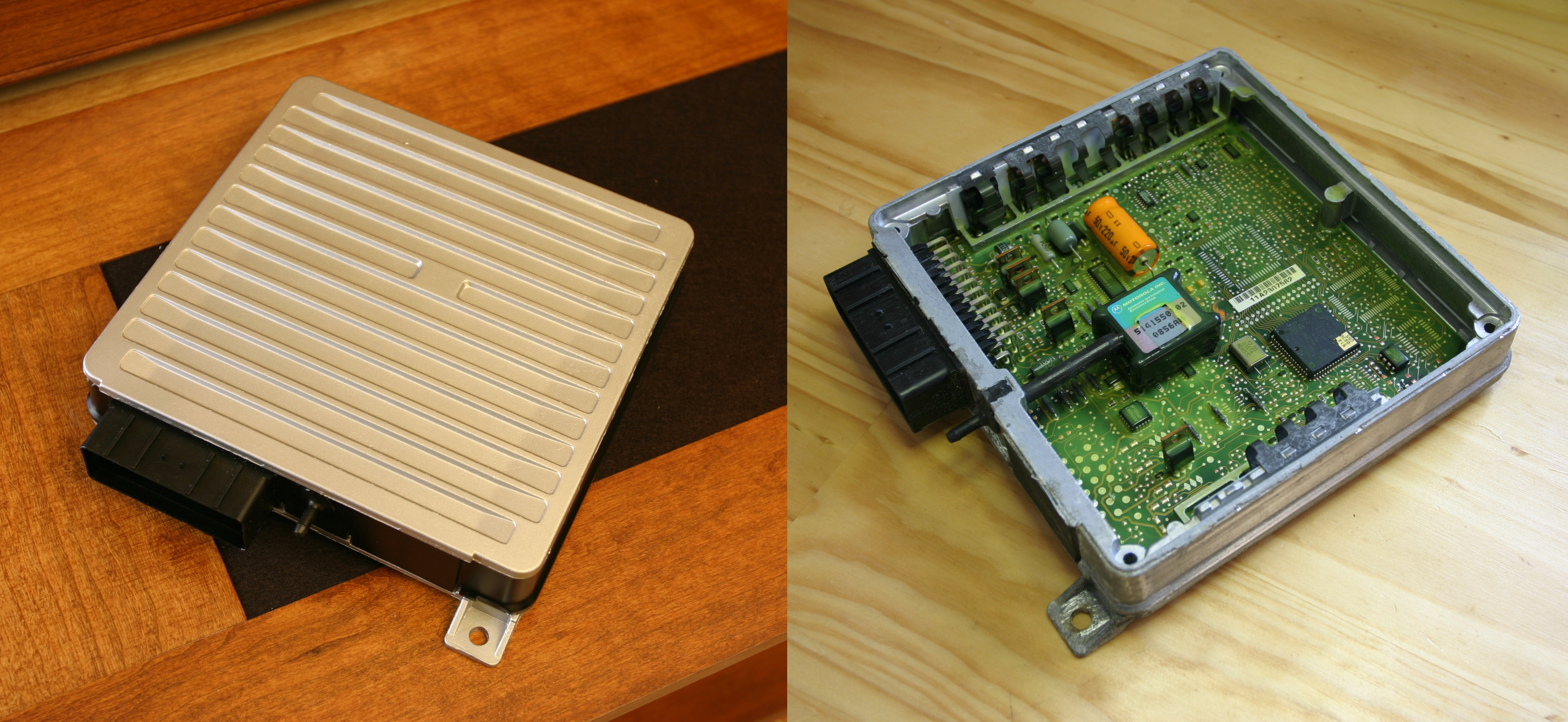
Rover MEMS ECU used in SPi and MPi versions

== See also ==
- BMC B-series engine
- Rover K-series engine
- Rover L-series engine
- Tritec engine
