= MG ZT =

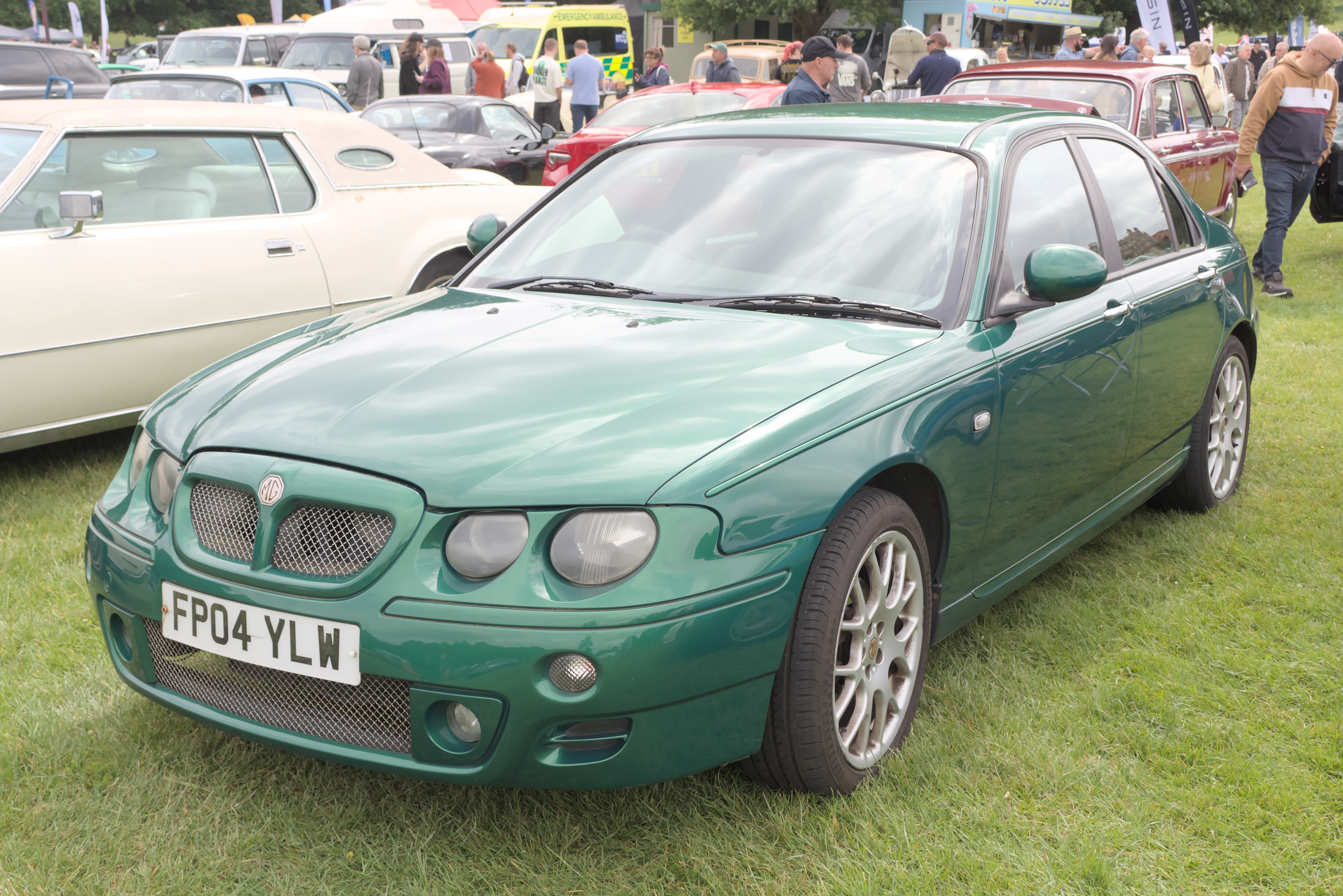

Overview
- Manufacturer: MG (MG Rover)
- Production: 2001–2005
- Assembly: United Kingdom: Longbridge, Birmingham (Longbridge Plant)
- Designer: Peter Stevens

Body and chassis
- Class: Executive car
- Body style: 4-door saloon; 5-door estate
- Layout: Front-engine, front-wheel-drive; Front-engine, rear-wheel-drive (260+)
- Related: MG 7; Rover 75; Roewe 750

Powertrain
- Engine: Petrol: 1.8 L 18K4F I4; 1.8 L 18K4T I4 turbo; 2.5 L KV6 V6; 4.6 L 2L2E V8 (RWD Model); Diesel: 2.0 L M47R I4

Dimensions
- Wheelbase: 2,746 mm (108.1 in) (saloon, estate)
- Length: 4,747 mm (186.9 in) (saloon); 4,791 mm (188.6 in) (estate)
- Width: 1,778 mm (70.0 in)
- Height: 1,424 mm (56.1 in)
- Curb weight: 1,400–1,655 kg (3,086–3,649 lb)

Chronology
- Predecessor: Rover 800 Vitesse; Rover 620ti; (Rover 75)
- Successor: MG 7/MG 750

The MG ZT is a car which was produced by MG Rover from 2001 to 2005. It was offered in saloon and estate versions, the latter designated as the MG ZT-T. Styling is similar to the Rover 75, upon which it was based, although various modifications, most noticeably the wheels and tyres, make for a far sportier ride. Production ceased in April 2005, amidst financial turmoil at MG Rover.

== Development history ==
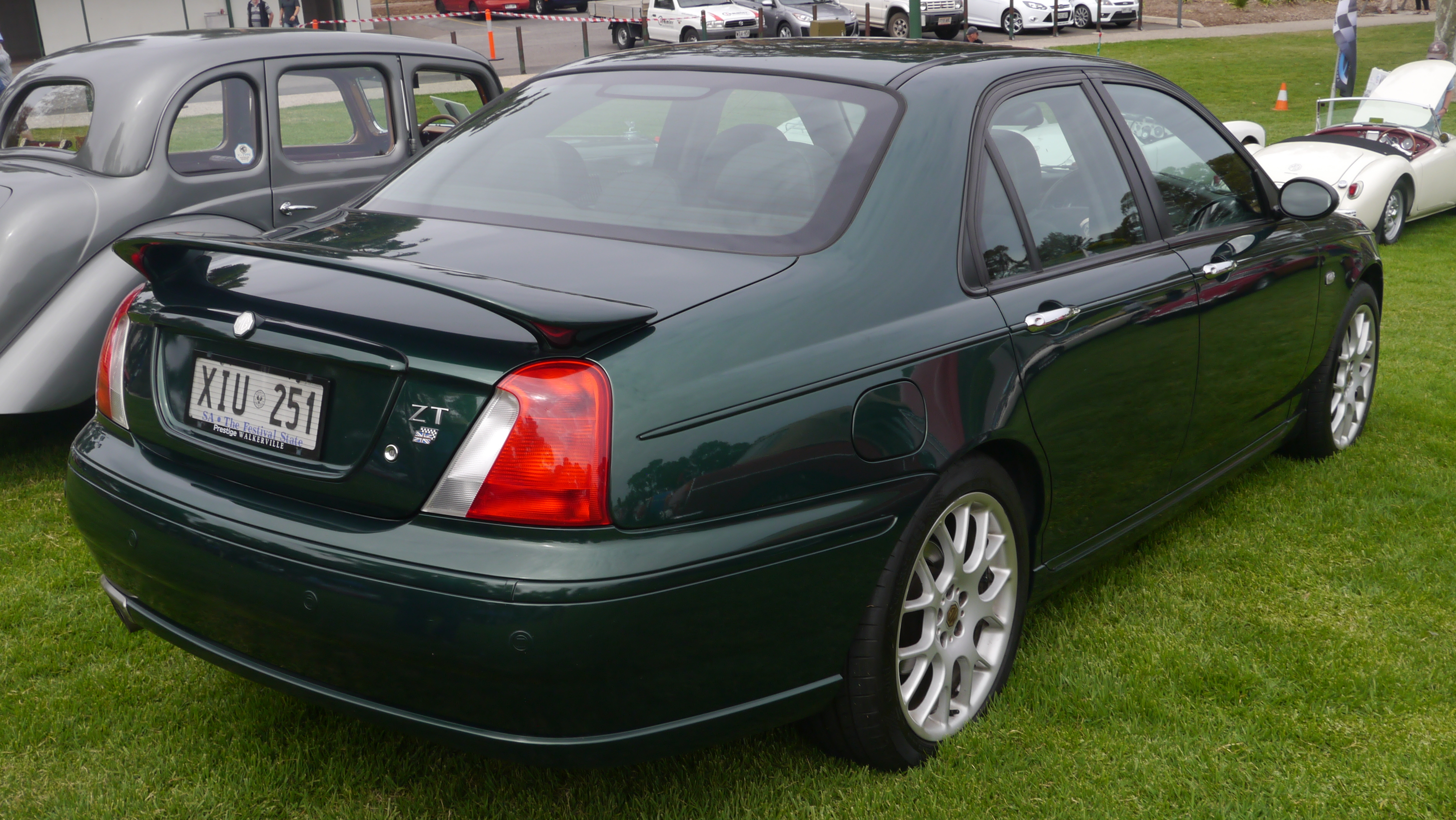
Pre facelift MG ZT+ 180 sedan (Australia)

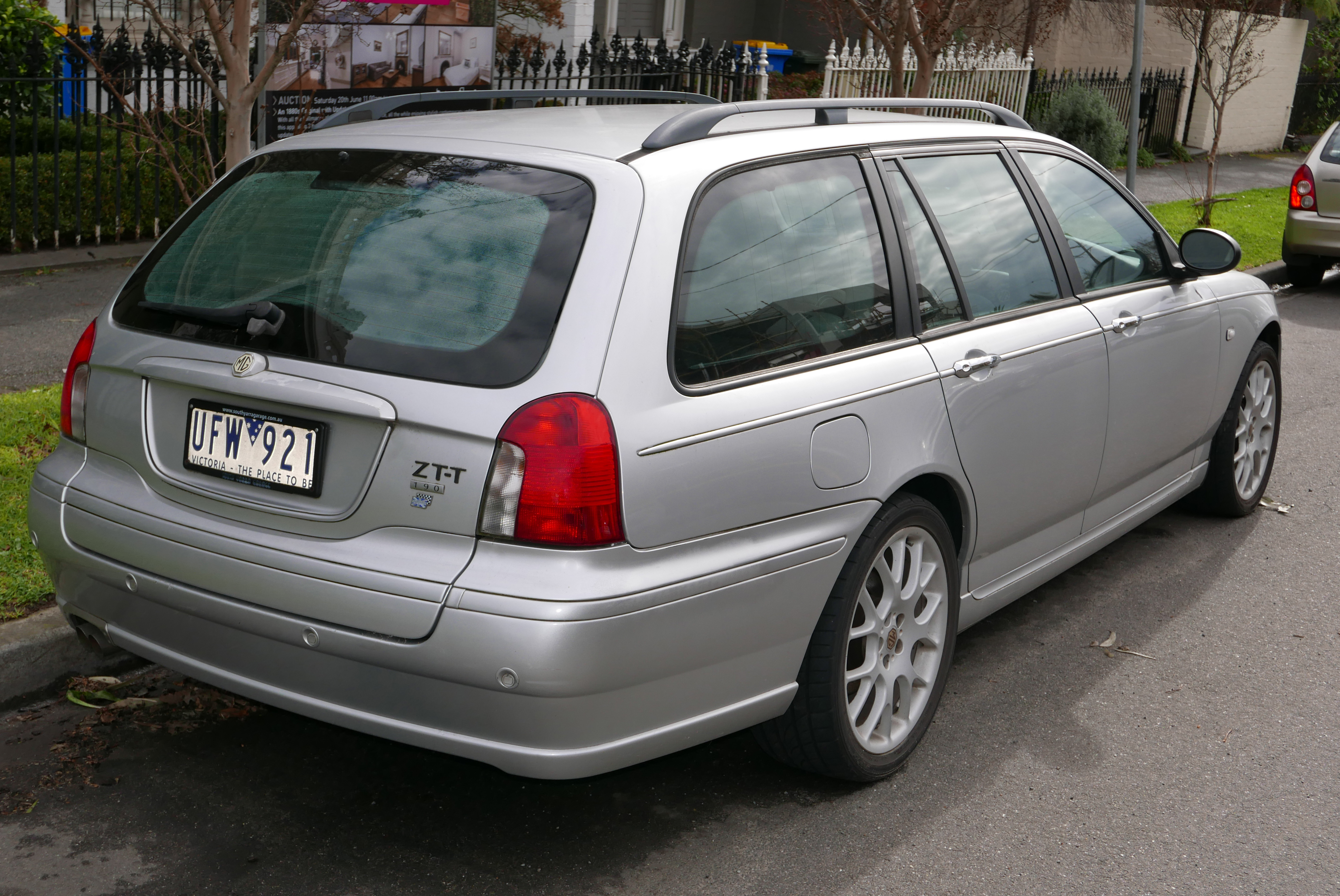
Pre facelift MG ZT-T+ 190 estate (Australia)

In 2001, three years after the launch of the Rover 75, and less than a year after the demerger of MG Rover from BMW, the MG ZT and MG ZT-T were launched. During the cars' development, the models were codenamed X10 and X11, for the saloon and estate versions, respectively.

The basic shape and styling of the MG ZT remained the same as for the Rover 75 but with changes to the front bumper, now with an integrated grille, and detail alterations including colour coding of the chromed waistline, a new bootlid plinth, and different alloy wheels and tyres sizes.

The interior featured revised seats and dashboard treatment, with new instrument faces. Engineering changes ranged, from upgraded suspension and brakes to revised engine tuning (from the Rover 75) for the petrol models. Development of the MG ZT was headed by Rob Oldaker, Product Development Director, with styling changes undertaken by Peter Stevens, who was previously responsible for the styling of the McLaren F1 and X180 version of the Lotus Esprit.

The MG ZT only had one trim level, though the standard car could be ordered with a "Plus" pack. MG ZT models were named after engine unit power output, i.e. a 160ps V6 model was a MG ZT 160, and a 190ps V6 model with a "Plus" pack was a MG ZT 190+.

The MG ZT differed in this way to the other new MG models launched at the same time, as its high-power version could be purchased as a standard spec.

The top power MG ZR 160 and MG ZS 180 were spec'ed to "plus" spec as standard. This only changed with the facelift of 2004 when 190 models were 190+ or 190+ SE. Many options were available from the standard list. MG Rover’s monogram programme allowed customers to almost tailor-make their ZT.

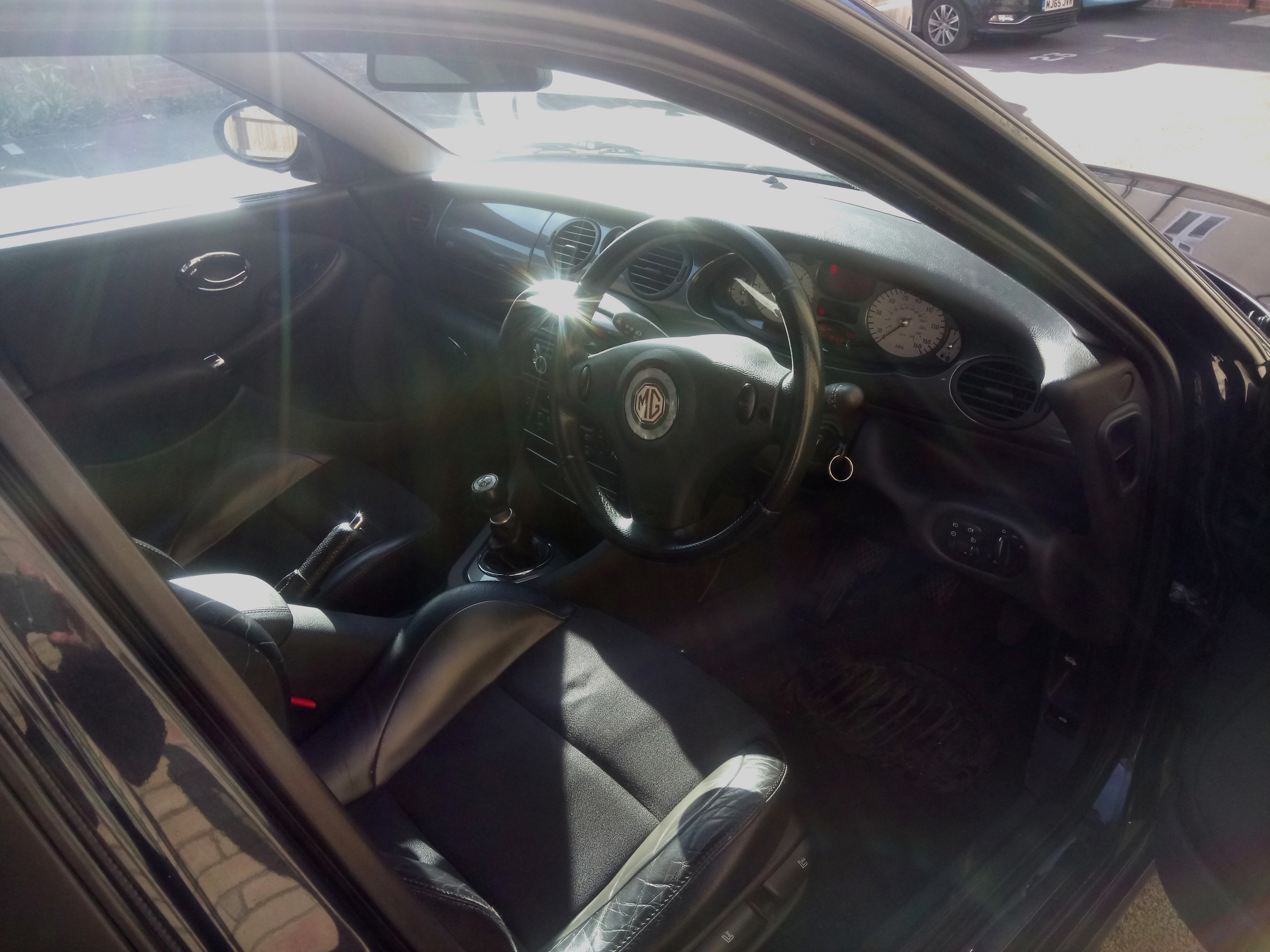
MG ZT+ Interior (UK)

=== Launch models ===
The first models launched were both V6 engined versions, the 160ps and the 190ps. The 160ps used a detuned by software, 177ps unit as found in the Rover 75. The 190ps used a unique version of the KV6 with different camshafts as well as air intake and throttle body changes.

=== Range Growth ===
In January 2002, the next model to be launched was the 180 Auto. This model used a 177PS KV6, but with 190 cam timing and 190 throttle modifications. Then in around August 2002, the diesel models were launched with a 116PS M47R unit. Customers could purchase a Xpower software upgrade, which would increase power to 131PS.

In July 2003, the 120 models were launched; these were powered by the 1.8 litre K16 unit. At around the same time, the 160 models started to use the 1.8 litre turbocharged version of the K16 unit, and the detuned V6 was dropped. In around October 2003, the much awaited V8 powered, rear-wheel-drive MG ZT 260 model was launched, in estate and saloon body styles.

=== Facelift ===
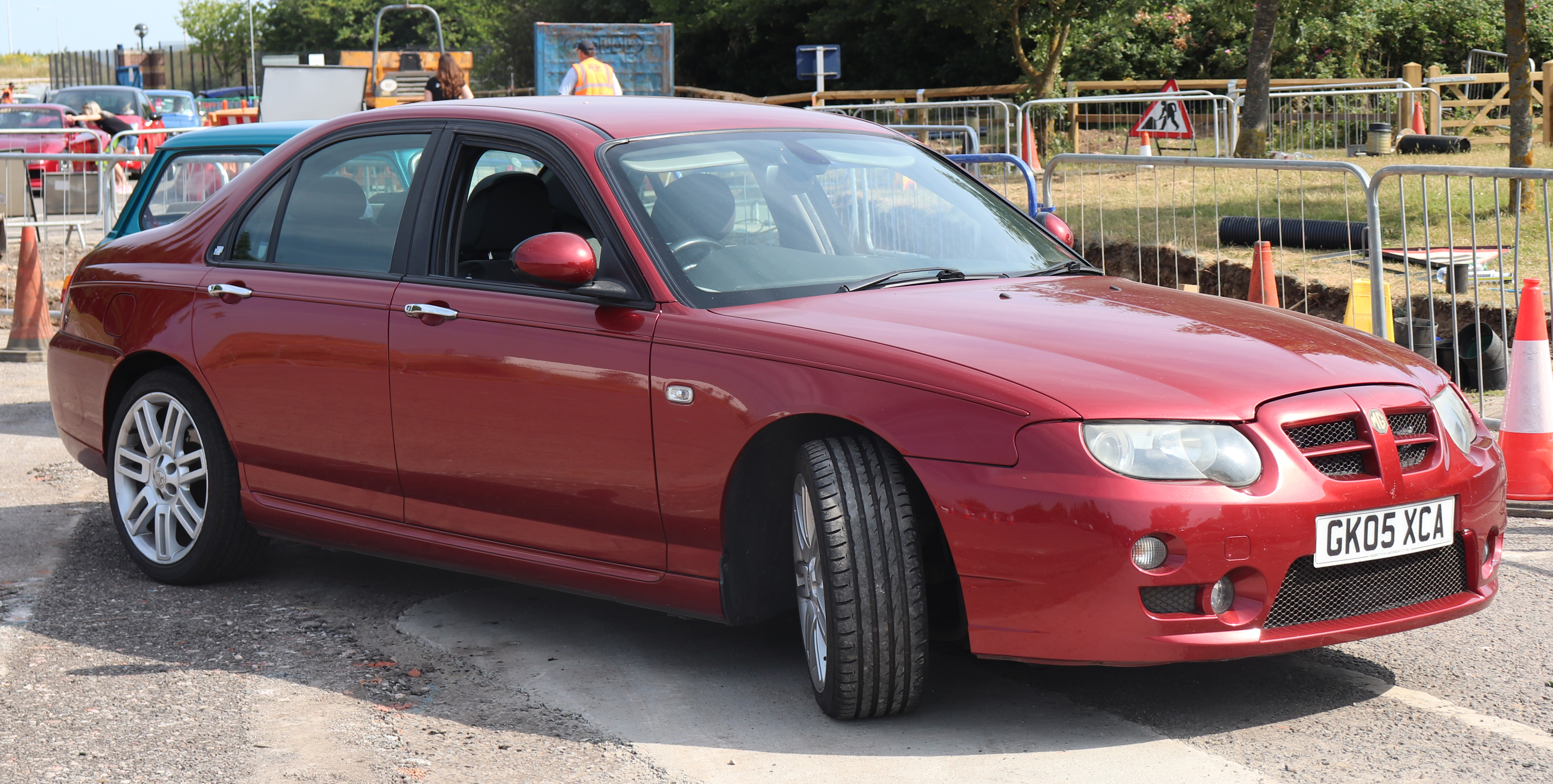
Facelift MG ZT Turbo 1.8 in Firefrost Red.

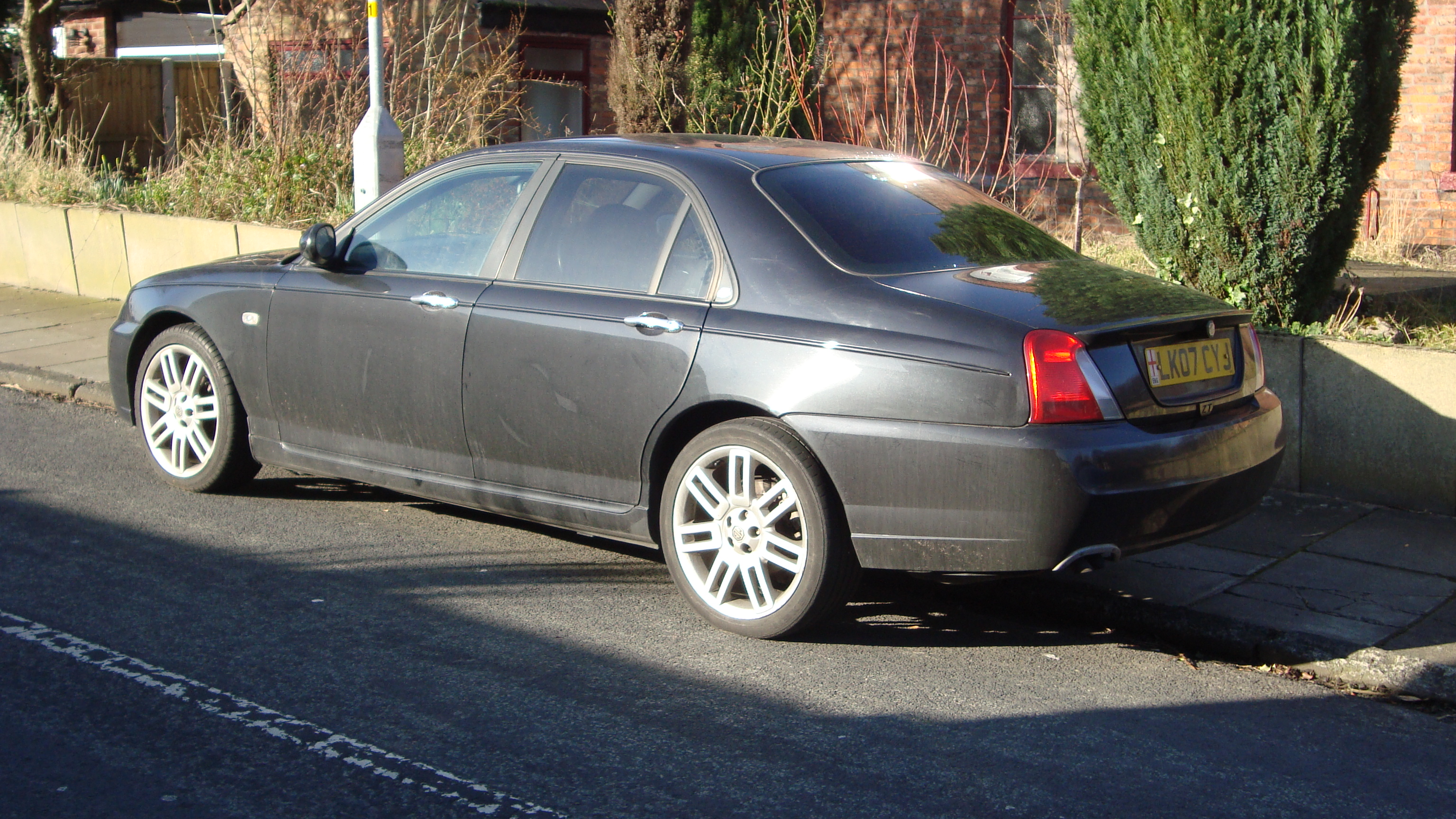
Facelift MG ZT CDTI 135 (UK)

During the first few months of 2004, MG Rover facelifted the design of the ZT and ZT-T to a less retro look, at the same time as the Rover 75 received a facelift. The facelift didn't feature much in the way mechanical differences to the ZT, most changes were merely aesthetic and the main changes to the facelift, included the replacement of the twin headlamps, with a new, clear single headlamp unit.

== Engines ==
The MG ZT (and Rover 75 derivative) were powered by a combination of MG Rover's own petrol and LPG K-Series and KV6 engines as well as Ford's Modular V8 and BMW's M47 diesel engine. The latter was designated M47R to identify the unit as an MG Rover special, having been modified by MG Rover's engineers for transverse installation, with performance and refinement characteristics unique to MG Rover.

The diesel MG ZT models didn't arrive until around August 2002. The MG ZT diesel models differed from the Rover 75 as both the lower power (116 PS) and the higher output (131 PS) models were badged as CDTi.

Petrol engines
Years	Model	Engine		Power			Torque		Top Speed ZT / ZT-T	0-62 mph (0–100 km/h) ZT / ZT-T	Economy	
Years	Model	Size/layout	Model	PS	kW	hp	N⋅m	lb⋅ft	Top Speed ZT / ZT-T	0-62 mph (0–100 km/h) ZT / ZT-T	mpg_{‑imp}	l/100 km
2003–2005	1.8 120 Manual	1798 cc I4	Rover K	120	88	118	160	118	121 mph (195 km/h) / 119 mph (192 km/h)	10.9 s / 11.3 s	36.2 mpg_{‑imp}	7.8 L/100 km
2003–2005	1.8 T 160 Manual	1798 cc turbo I4	Rover K	160	118	158	215	159	132 mph (212 km/h) / 130 mph (209 km/h)	8.5 s / 8.9 s	34.9	8.1
2002–2005	2.5 V6 180 Automatic	2498 cc V6	Rover KV6	177	130	175	240	177	134 mph (216 km/h) / 132 mph (212 km/h)	8.9 s / 9.3 s	26.9	10.5
2001–2005	2.5 V6 190 Manual	2498 cc V6	Rover KV6	190	140	187	245	181	140 mph (225 km/h) / 137 mph (220 km/h)	7.7 s / 8.2 s	28.4 mpg_{‑imp}	9.9 L/100 km
2003–2005	4.6 V8 260 Manual	4601 cc V8	Ford; Modular	260	191	256	410	302	155 mph (249 km/h) / 153 mph (246 km/h)	6.2 s / 6.3 s	23.1 mpg_{‑imp}	12.2 L/100 km
2003–2005	4.6 V8 260 Automatic	4601 cc V8	Ford; Modular	260	191	256	410	302	151 mph (243 km/h)	7.0 s	22.1 mpg_{‑imp}	12.8 L/100 km
Diesel engines
Years	Model	Engine		Power			Torque		Top Speed ZT / ZT-T	0-62 mph (0–100 km/h) ZT / ZT-T	Economy	
Years	Model	Size/layout	Manufacturer	PS	kW	hp	N⋅m	lb⋅ft	Top Speed ZT / ZT-T	0-62 mph (0–100 km/h) ZT / ZT-T	mpg_{‑imp}	l/100 km
2002–2005	2.0 CDTi 120 Manual	1951 cc CDTi I4	BMW M47	116	85	114	260	192	120 mph (193 km/h) / 115 mph (185 km/h)	11.0 s / 11.5 s	50.0	5.65
2002–2005	2.0 CDTi 120 Automatic	1951 cc CDTi I4	BMW M47	116	85	114	260	192	118 mph (190 km/h) / 112 mph (180 km/h)	12.2 s / 12.6 s	40.9 mpg_{‑imp}	6.91 L/100 km
2002–2005	2.0 CDTi 135	1951 cc CDTi I4	BMW M47	131	96	129	300	221	121 mph (195 km/h) / 119 mph (192 km/h)	10.3 s / 10.6 s	50.0	5.65
2002–2005	2.0 CDTi 135 Automatic	1951 cc CDTi I4	BMW M47	131	96	129	300	221	118 mph (190 km/h) / 117 mph (188 km/h)	11.0 s / 11.4 s	40.9 mpg_{‑imp}	6.91 L/100 km

== Production ==
The MG ZT and MG ZT-T were assembled at MG Rover's Longbridge plant in Birmingham, United Kingdom. The production figures for each year are given below

Year	Number
2001	3,510
2002	6,914
2003	8,011
2004	6,844
2005	1,870
Total	27,149

== Land Speed Record ==
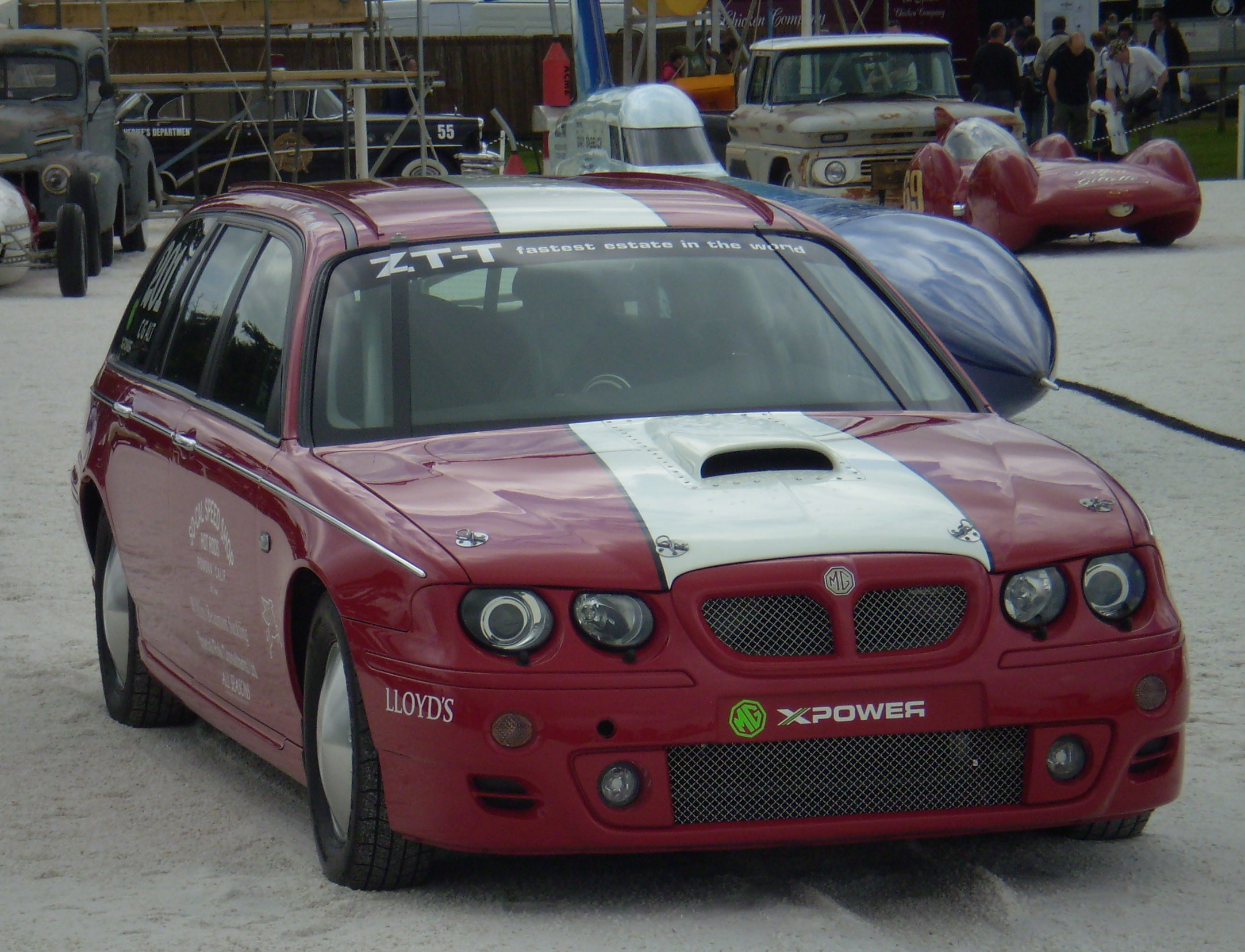
This MG ZT-T became the world's fastest (non production) estate in 2003

Also in September 2003, the MG ZT-T became the World's Fastest (non production) Estate Car, with a top speed of 225.609 mph (360.9 km/h). It achieved this at 55th annual Bonneville Speed Week Nationals, on the Bonneville Salt Flats in Utah, United States. This car used an 800+bhp Roush V8 engine, with other heavy modifications.

== MG Sport & Racing ==
=== XPower 385 ===
The XPower 385 ZT, was a set of concepts created by MG Rover to show the "Ultimate" version of the 260 V8. The 385 was equipped with a 385PS 4 Valve Ford Modular V8. A similar engine that was fitted in the 385 concept car and the "ultimate" ZT was later fitted in the MG SV. The development of the cars was undertaken by Prodrive, but the cars never appeared as MG Rover closed in April 2005.

The cars were fitted with a wide bodykit, and featured a spoiler on the rear of the car.

=== XPower 500 ===
Before the ZT 260 was launched, MG created a special concept car: the MG XPower ZT 500. This car was intended to show off what MG can do with the ZT's chassis, and was never intended for mass production. The XPower ZT is fitted with a 500PS supercharged 4.6 litre Ford Modular V8, similar the engine fitted to the 260 ZT. The XPower 500 has a more aggressive wide bodykit, with larger spoiler similar to the XPower 385.

The car was saved by the MG Owners Club, and rebuilt using their extensive facilities and expertise. The car was allocated VIN No 001.

=== Competition cars ===
The last competition car built by MG Sports and Racing was a racing version of the V8 MG ZT260. This car was highly modified and lightened it had more power than the standard V8 and a lightweight racing bodykit. The car is now owned by an Australian MG Enthusiast who races it competitively. It is painted dark grey in colour.

== Chinese production ==
Nanjing Automobile of China purchased MG Rover in July 2005, three months after the company went bankrupt. Production of the MG ZT effectively resumed in the beginning of 2007, though in the form of the MG 7.

=== MG7 ===
The MG 7 is a sports saloon that is built by Chinese carmaker MG Motor, derived from the MG ZT. Production started in March 2007. The MG 7 received praise from British car magazine Auto Express, who test drove it in May 2008, although it has not officially been sold in the United Kingdom.

The MG 7 comes in two variants, the first which resembles the Mark I MG ZT with twin front lights, and the second, which resembles the Mark II Rover 75 V8. A long wheelbase version, called the MG 7L, features the deeper radiator grille of the Rover 75 V8.

=== Roewe 750 ===
Also released at the same time as the MG 7, the Roewe 750 appeared from the company SAIC, of which SAIC & Nanjing later merged. The Roewe 750 showed how the two companies worked, while the MG 7 retained the classic looks of the Mark 1 ZT, SAIC opted for the Mark 2 Style Rover 75 style exterior.

== Owners clubs ==
The cars are still actively supported by an owners club and an owners group specifically for the V8 model.
