= Rover 100 =

The name Rover 100 may refer to one of two different British motor vehicles:

- Rover P4 100; produced by The Rover Co. Ltd. from 1960 to 1962
- Rover Metro, at various times also known as the Austin Mini Metro and Rover 100, amongst other names; produced by Austin Rover Group and MG Rover Group from 1980 to 1998
