= Austin Metro =

Supermini British economy car

Metro
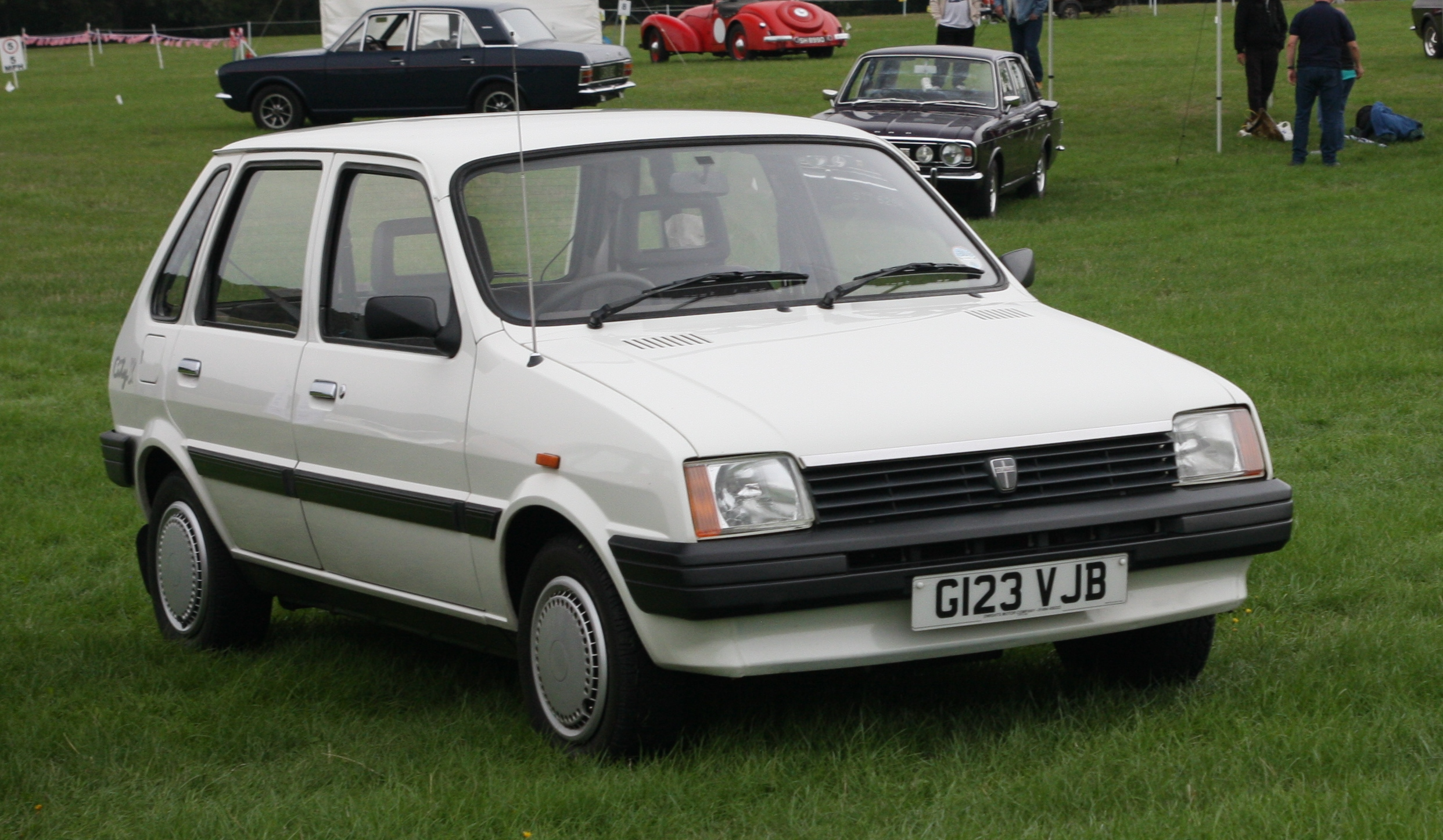
- 1989 Mk2 Metro (without prefixed marque)

Overview
- Manufacturer: British Leyland (1980–1986); Rover Group (1986–1998)
- Also called: Austin Mini Metro; Austin Metro; MG Metro; Metro; Rover Metro; Rover 100 Series
- Production: 1980–1998; 2,078,218 produced
- Assembly: United Kingdom: Longbridge, Birmingham (Longbridge plant)

Body and chassis
- Class: Supermini (B)
- Layout: Front-engine, front-wheel drive
- Related: Mini

Chronology
- Predecessor: Mini
- Successor: Rover 25 / Rover CityRover

The Metro is a supermini car, later a city car, that was produced from 1980 to 1997, first by British Leyland (BL) and later by its successor the Rover Group. The Metro was intended to complement and eventually replace the original Mini. It was launched as the Austin Mini Metro (Note: Styled AUSTIN miniMETRO) sold under the Austin badge, and in 1982, sportier MG versions were made available. From 1987, the car was sold simply as the "Metro" after the cessation of the Austin brand. In 1990, the Metro was redesigned and sported the Rover brand name, sold as the Rover 100 (Note: (full name: "Rover 100 series")) abroad, which would also replace the Metro nameplate in Britain from 1995 onwards.

The Metro quickly proved popular and became Britain's best-selling car for some time. There was also a van version, sold under the Morris badge and later as the Metrovan. Although the R3-generation Rover 200 introduced in 1995 (and smaller than previous 200 models) had originally been designed as a replacement for the Metro, it was not marketed as such after its launch. The Metro (now known as Rover 100) finally ceased production on 23 December 1997, being outlived by three years by the original Mini that it was meant to replace. 2,078,218 Metros of all types were built.

== Development ==
BL's last all-new mass-produced car before the Metro's launch was the 1976 Rover SD1. Plans for a replacement for the Mini, originally created by British Motor Corporation (BMC) in the 1950s, had been afoot within BL since the early 1970s, but none of the concepts conceived got beyond the initial design stages, largely due to a shortage of funds at British Leyland, and its eventual bankruptcy and government bailout in 1975. The modern supermini market had evolved during the 1970s, with earlier small cars like the Mini and Hillman Imp being followed mostly by cars of a two-box hatchback configuration, beginning with the Fiat 127 in 1971 and Renault 5 in 1972, with the next five years seeing the arrival of similar cars including the Ford Fiesta and Volkswagen Polo, as well as the Vauxhall Chevette from General Motors (known in West Germany as the Opel Kadett) which was also available as a saloon and estate in addition to the hatchback. These cars gained a decent-sized market share in Britain and most other European markets.

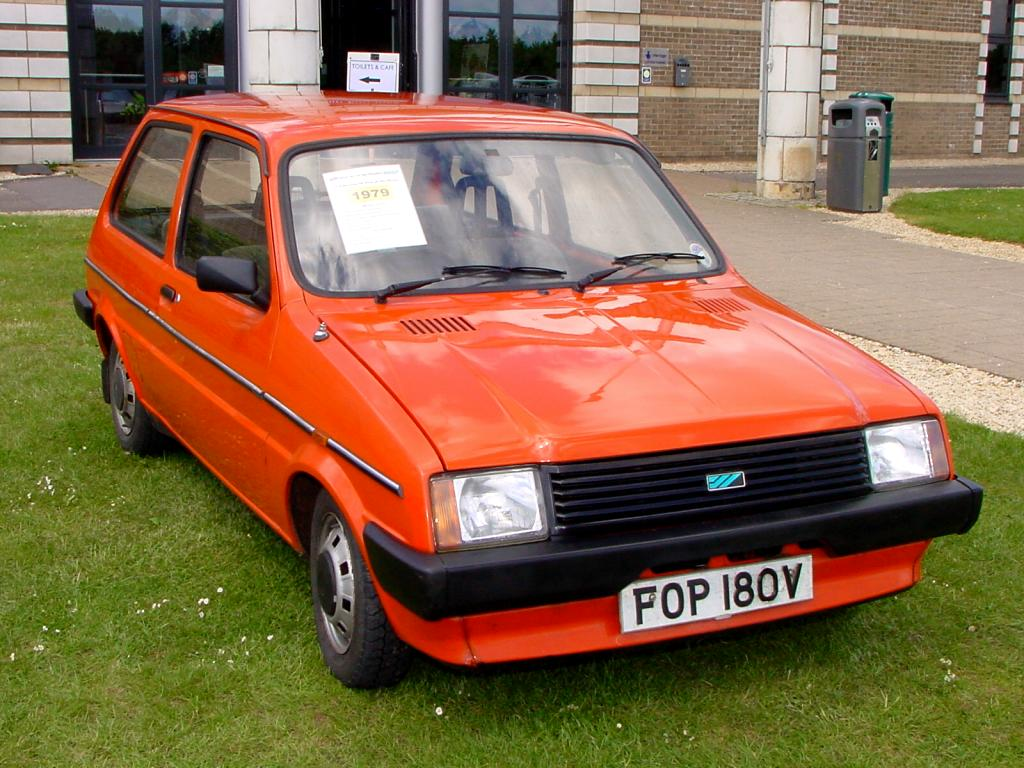
1979 pre-production Metro

The roots of the Metro lay in an earlier project denoted as ADO88 (Austin Drawing Office, 88-inch wheelbase), which was intended to be a direct replacement for the Mini. By 1977, the ADO88 was in an advanced state of development with running prototypes undergoing testing and much of the car's body structure designed and ready for production. However, poor reception of its styling at customer clinics and the increasing dominance of superminis in the ADO88's intended market segment forced a major change in the project's focus. In late 1977, BL chairman Michael Edwardes ordered that ADO88 be given an eleventh-hour redesign to make it both larger, and less utilitarian in appearance / more upmarket in nature. It thus became BL's first supermini rather than an economy car. The revised project was given the designator LC8 (Leyland Cars Number 8), and the definitive Metro design would ultimately emerge under the leadership of BL's chief stylists David Bache and Harris Mann. LC8 would replace the more upmarket, lower-volume Clubman versions of the Mini and the lower-spec, smaller-engined variants of the Austin Allegro (which would be fully replaced in the early 1980s by project LC10, which became the Austin Maestro). The ADO88 project had experimented with new engines and suspension systems, but, with limited time and budgets, LC8 would reuse much of the Mini's engineering (the A-Series engine, front-wheel drive via a sump-mounted four-speed transmission, front and rear running gear carried in steel subframes separate from the unitary bodyshell) and borrow the Hydragas suspension system developed for the Allegro. The floorpan and core structure of ADO88 was retained largely unmodified, but every external panel was changed as part of its transition into LC8.

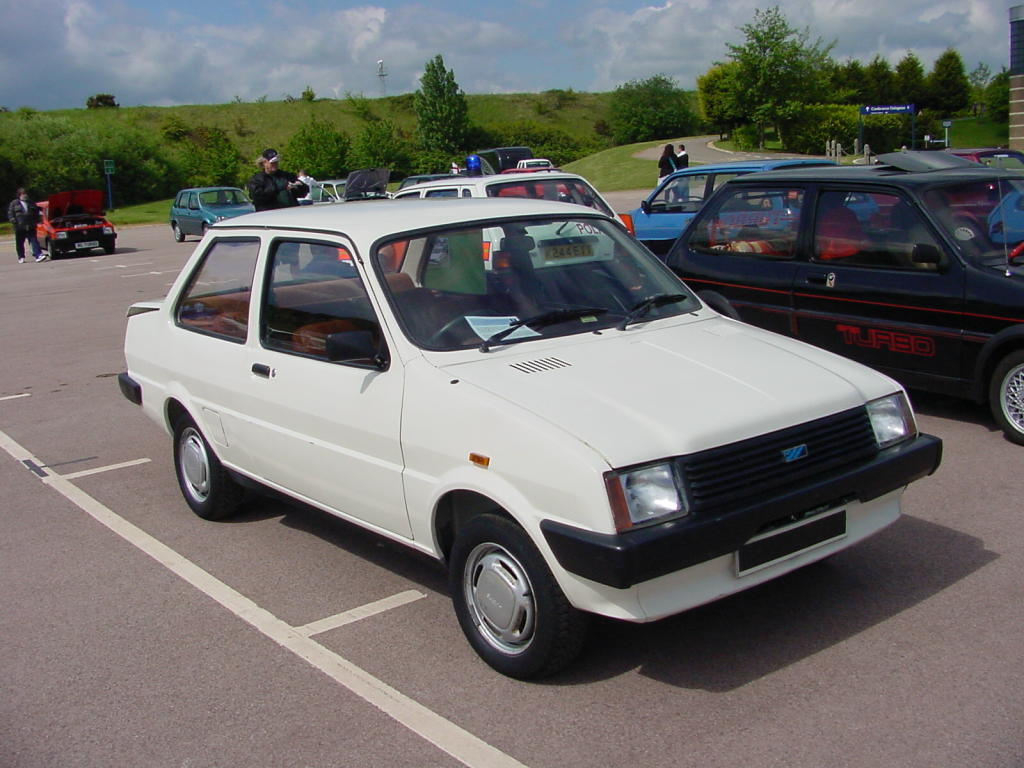
Prototype "notchback" saloon Austin Metro

However, while much was shared conceptually with older BL models, LC8 would see these design elements heavily re-engineered and modernised. For instance the A-Series drivetrain was extensively updated with new materials and tooling to become the A-Plus, while the new car would feature 12-inch wheels, and all LC8s would have servo-assisted four-piston front disc brakes with fully split hydraulic systems, as opposed to the entry-level, standard Mini which at the time still had 10-inch wheels and drum brakes all-round. These new drivetrains, wheels, brakes and many other featured developed for the LC8 would be introduced on the Mini not long afterwards, updating the 30-year old design at minimal extra cost, and providing highly desirable economies of scale, given the anticipated sales volumes of the new car. This would make it cost effective for the more basic versions of the Mini to remain in production as an entry-level model for BL, continuing in the market niche originally intended for ADO88, while allowing the LC8 to aim higher, and compete head-on with the generally longer bodied superminis of other brands.

Following the Ryder Report, which prioritized the ADO88/LC8 project, Longbridge was expanded in 1978 with a £200mn robotised body assembly line (known as the "New West Works") to enable it to produce the new model, which it was hoped would sell 100,000 or more units a year in Britain alone. Production of the smaller Mini and larger Allegro was also pruned back to enable the plant to produce as many units of the Metro as possible, with the Allegro finally being axed in 1982 to make way for the Maestro.

== Austin/MG Metro (Mk1; 1980) ==
Austin Metro
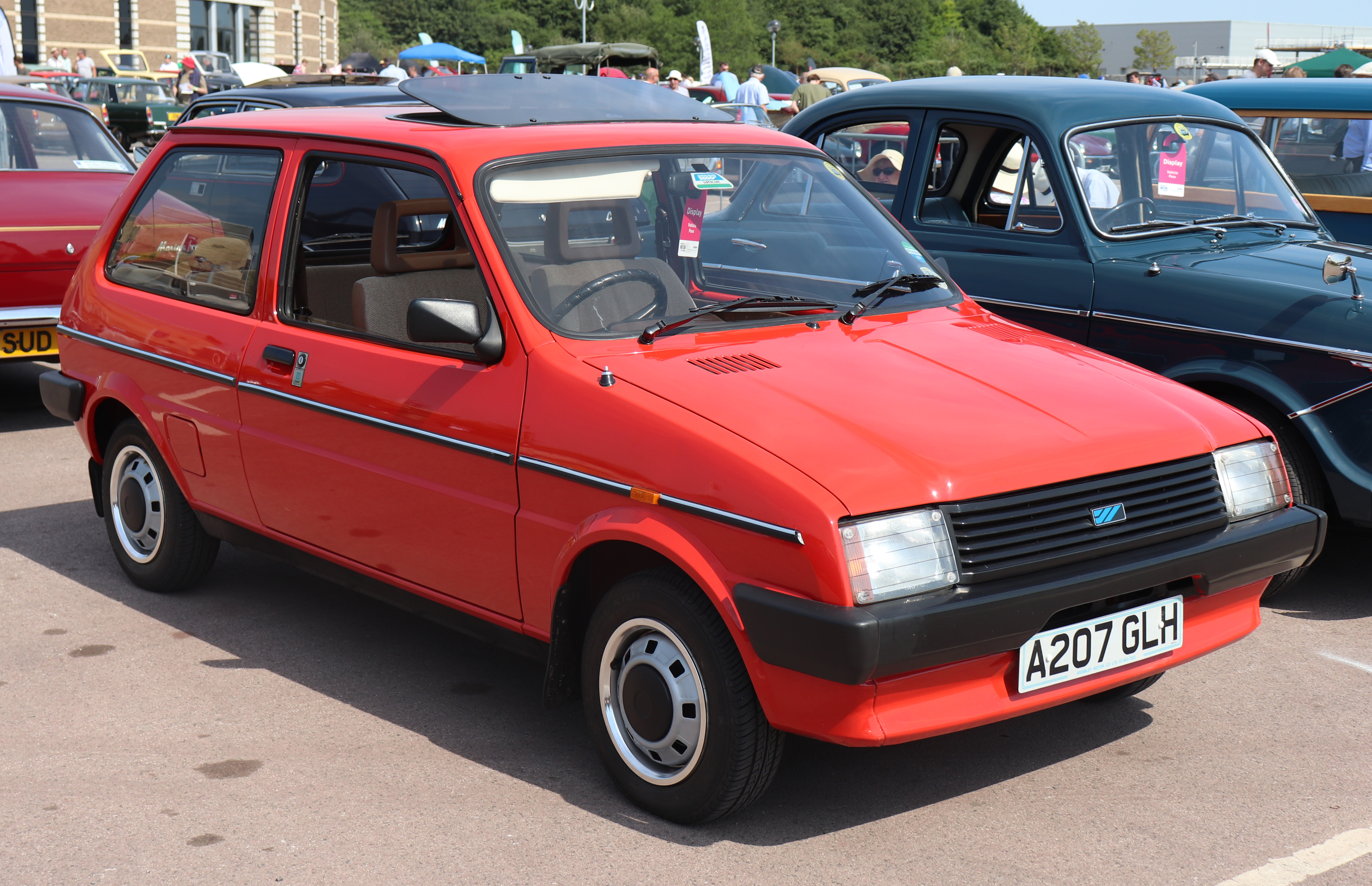
- 1983 Austin Metro Mk1 (1.3 S)

Overview
- Manufacturer: British Leyland: BL Cars Ltd (1980–1983); Austin Rover Group (1983–1988); Rover Group; Rover Cars (1986–1990)
- Also called: Austin Mini Metro; Rover Metro; MG Metro; Morris Metro
- Production: 1980–1990
- Designer: David Bache; Harris Mann

Body and chassis
- Body style: 3-/5-door hatchback 3-door van
- Platform: LC8

Powertrain
- Engine: 0.85 L A-Series I4 (South America); 1.0 L A-Series I4; 1.3 L A-Series I4; 1.3 L A-Series turbo I4
- Transmission: 4-speed BMC Manual transmission (ADO88/LC8); 4-speed BMC-AP automatic (ADO88/LC8)

Dimensions
- Wheelbase: 2,250 mm (88.6 in)
- Length: 3,400 mm (133.9 in)
- Width: 1,550 mm (61.0 in)
- Height: 1,360 mm (53.5 in)
- Kerb weight: 760–865 kilograms (1,676–1,907 lb)

On 8 October 1980, BL introduced the Austin Mini Metro. The name was chosen by a ballot of BL employees. They were offered a choice of three names, "Match", "Maestro" or "Metro". Once the result was announced, the train-and-bus manufacturer Metro-Cammell objected to BL's use of the Metro name. The issue was resolved by BL promising to advertise the car only as the "Mini Metro"; however, after a while "Mini" was dropped from the name.

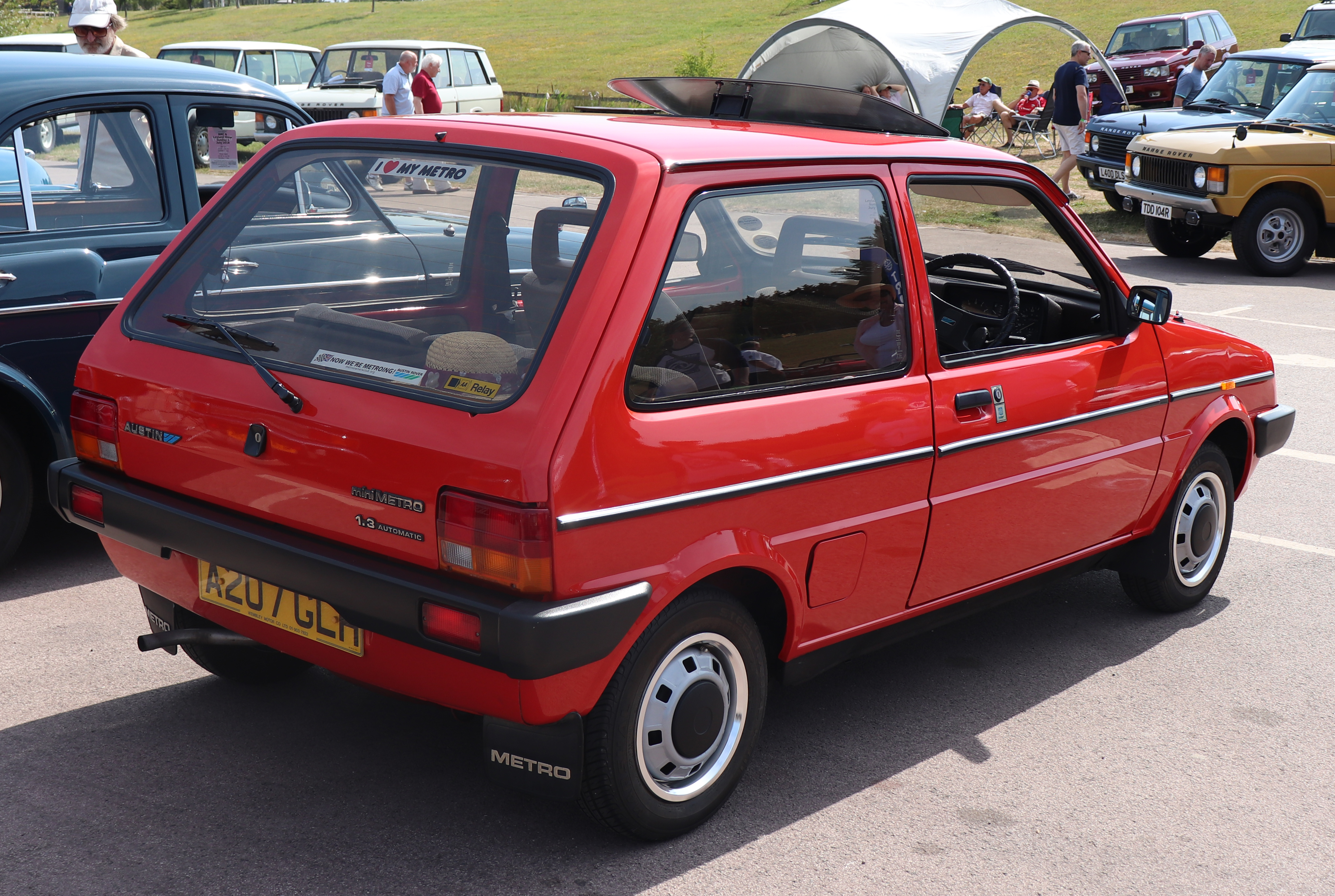
1983 Austin Metro rear

The hatchback bodyshell was one of the most spacious of its time, and this was a significant factor in its popularity. The space-efficient interior was also lauded for the novel 60/40 split rear seat, which was standard on higher-specification models. The original Mk. 1 Metros also featured David Bache's signature "symmetric" dashboard design (also used on the Range Rover and the Rover SD1), where the main dashboard moulding consisted of a shelf onto which the instrument binnacle was simply mounted on the left or the right hand side: this arrangement saves the tooling cost of two separate dashboard mouldings for right and left-hand drive models. Initially, the Metro was sold as a three-door hatchback only (as were most of its competitors), with a choice of 998cc (1.0 litre) or 1275cc (1.3-litre) petrol engines. The 1.0 and 1.0L cars, and the van that came out later, had recessed headlamps with indicators and sidelights in the bumper, whereas the 1.0HLE, 1.3S, and 1.3HLS had headlight and indicator as one unit, which was flush-fitting.

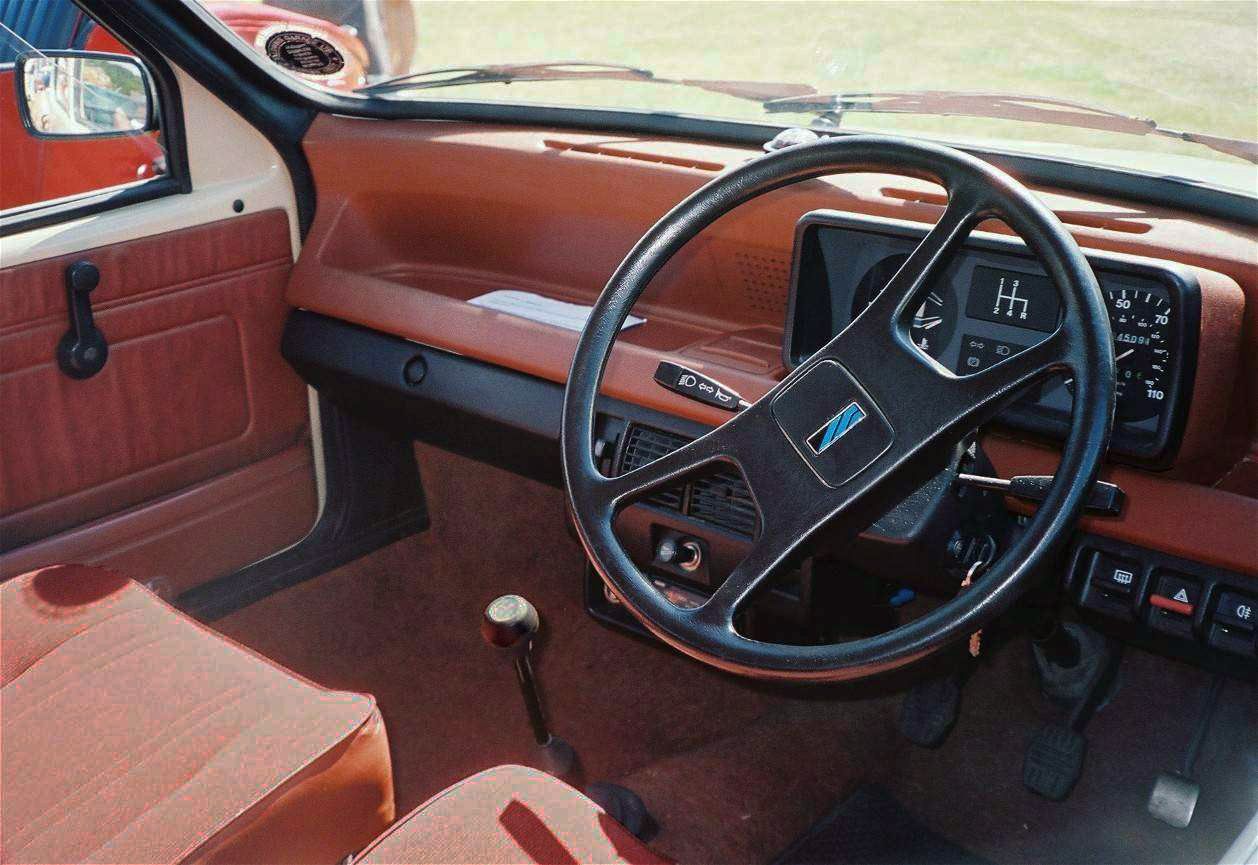
The interior of a 1980 Austin Metro Mk. 1

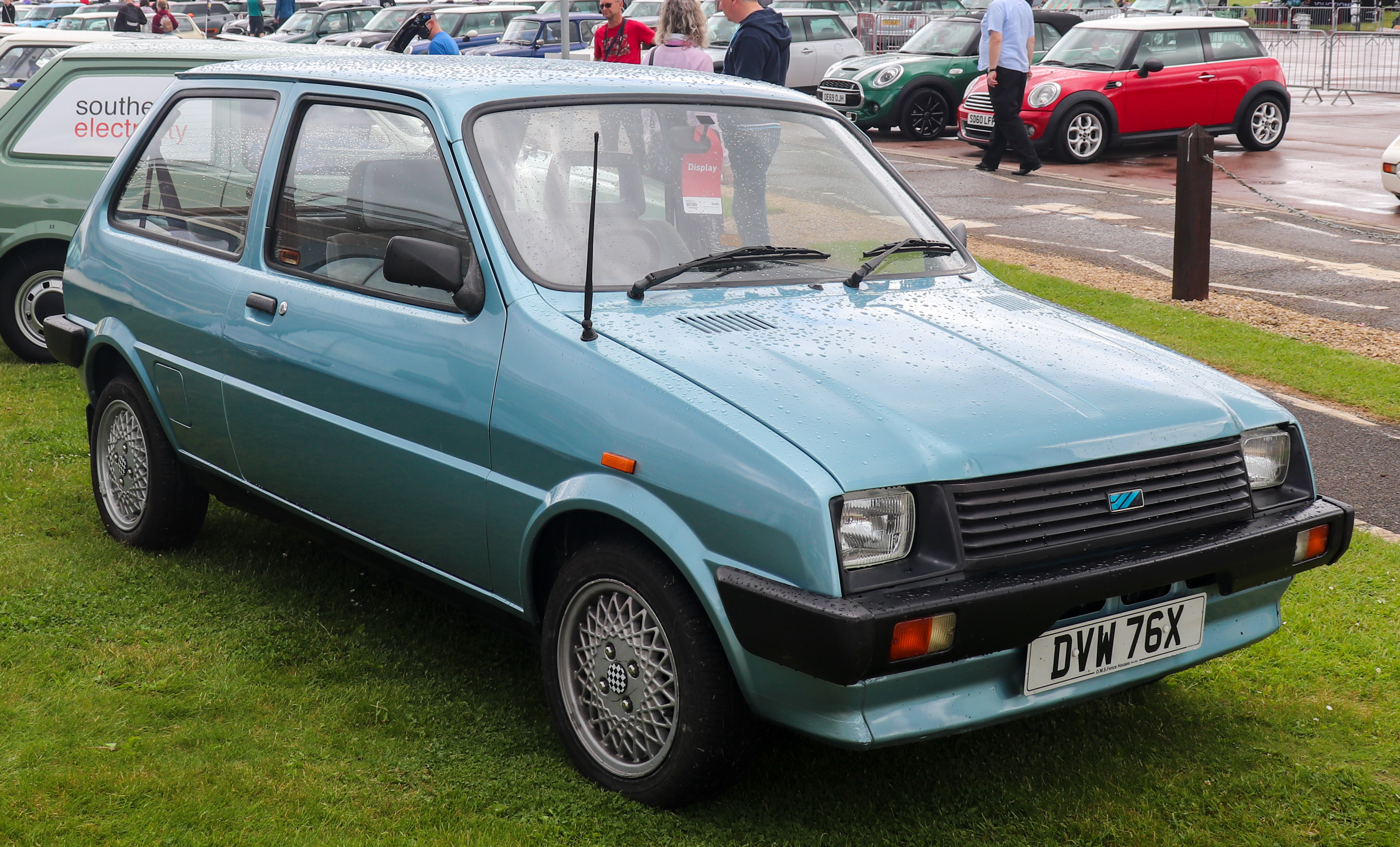
Austin Mini Metro L 1.0 (with recessed headlights and separate indicators)

A two-door saloon model was included in the Metro's development, which would have been similar in concept to the Vauxhall Chevette saloon and the Polo-based Volkswagen Derby. However, by the time production of the Metro began, it was decided not to include a saloon version, this niche being filled by the Mini remaining in production; also because only a few of the Metro's competitors were available as a saloon.

=== Launch and reception ===
One of the consequences was that there was enormous public interest in the car from well before its launch. The company chose to stage the launch presentations for dealers and major company car buyers on board a cruise ship, the MS Vistafjord. This launch event took place over a three-week period in September 1980 sailing between West Gladstone Dock in Liverpool and the Isle of Man, where guests could drive the car, so long as sea conditions allowed them to land by tender as there was no dock facility for the ship. The news broke in the national newspapers a full year ahead of the public launch with The Sun, among others, carrying the story. It was finally revealed to the public on the press day of the British Motor Show on 8 October with the British Prime Minister, Margaret Thatcher, in attendance. Production at Longbridge was briefly halted in November after a strike following a dispute regarding production of Metro seats. It was halted again by a strike lasting from 16 December until January 1981, with further disruptions in May and November of that year.

A major TV advertising campaign was created by the London agency, Leo Burnett which came up with the headline "a British car to beat the world". The advert also featured the similar-sized Fiat 127, Renault 5, Volkswagen Polo and Datsun Cherry as "foreign invaders" and the voiceover spoke of the Metro's ability to "send the foreigners back where they came from". Following the launch of the Austin Maestro in 1983, less of British Leyland's advertising was focused on the Metro. The Maestro initially sold very well, but within five years sales were declining sharply, although it remained in production until 1994.

The Metro quickly proved popular with buyers. Its clever interior design made it spacious considering its dimensions, and Hydragas suspension gave surprisingly good ride and handling. Its updated A+ series 1.0 and 1.3-litre OHV engines hardly represented the cutting edge in performance, but they were strong on economy. A 19-year-old Lady Diana Spencer being the car's first celebrity owner and was widely believed to have been a gift from her fiancée - the then Prince Charles, and the car was a feature of many paparazzi shots of the future princess taken before her marriage to Charles in 1981.

Even then, during the early part of its production life, it was the best selling mini-car in the country before being eclipsed by the updated Ford Fiesta in 1984. In its best year, 1983, more than 130,000 Metros were sold in Britain, only the Ford Escort and Sierra outsold it. This was despite the arrival of a host of new superminis on the British market that year – the Ford Fiesta received a major facelift, and four all-new superminis (the Vauxhall Nova, Fiat Uno, Nissan Micra and Peugeot 205) went on sale in Britain between April and September.

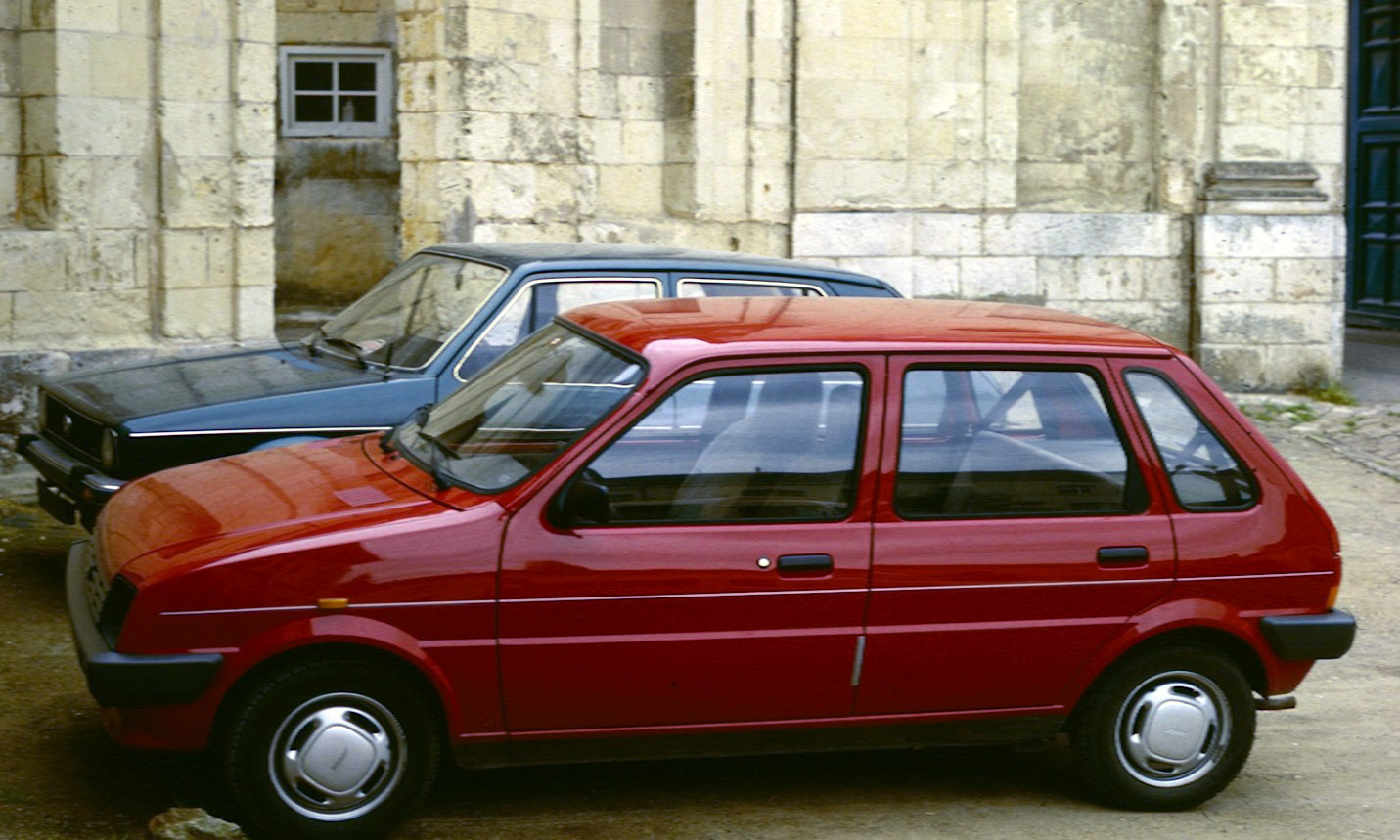
A five-door Metro eventually became available in October 1984.

==== Launch prices ====
- MiniMetro 1.0 £3,095 (£13,486 in 2026 adjusted for inflation)
- MiniMetro 1.0L £3,495
- MiniMetro 1.0HLE £3,695
- MiniMetro 1.3S £3,995
- MiniMetro 1.3HLS £4,296

=== MG variants ===
During 1981, British Leyland confirmed that the Metro range would soon be expanded with more luxurious and high performance versions. The Metro range was expanded in May 1982 to include the luxury Vanden Plas trim level on the Austins and higher performance MG Badged versions; the MG Metro marked a quick comeback for the marque previously used on sports cars until the Abingdon plant making the MG B closed in 1980. The Metro Vanden Plas featured higher levels of luxury and equipment, while the slightly more powerful MG Metro 1.3 sold as a sports model (0–60 mph in 10.9 seconds, top speed 103 mph). The Vanden Plas variant received the same MG engine from 1984 onwards (with the exception of the VP Automatic, which retained the 63 bhp (47 kW) 1275 cc unit). The luxury fittings marking out the Metro Vanden Plas took the form of a radio-cassette player, electric front windows, an improved instrument panel with tachometer, and a variety of optional extras such as trip computer, leather trim, remote boot release, and front fog lamps.

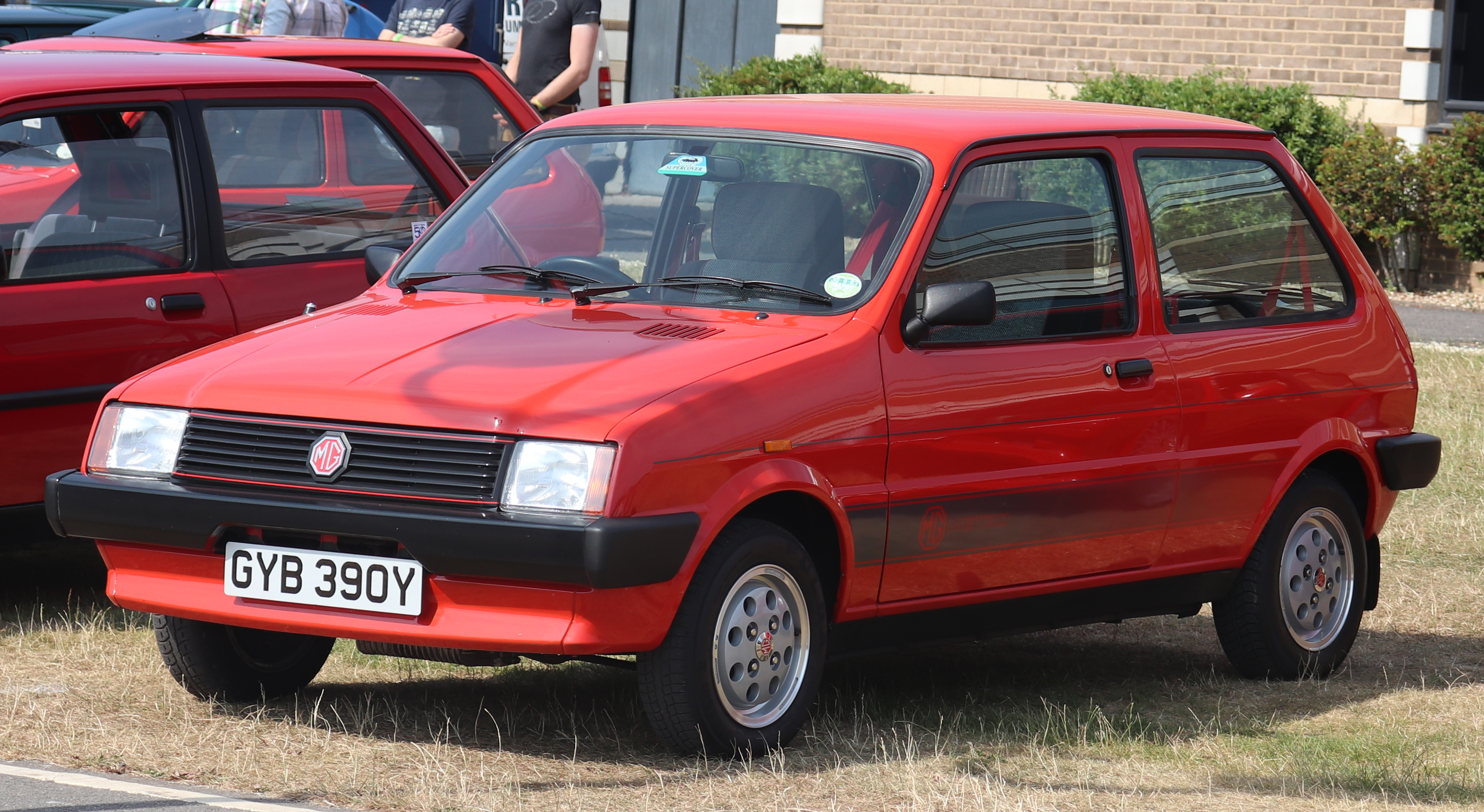
1983 MG Metro 1300 Mk.I

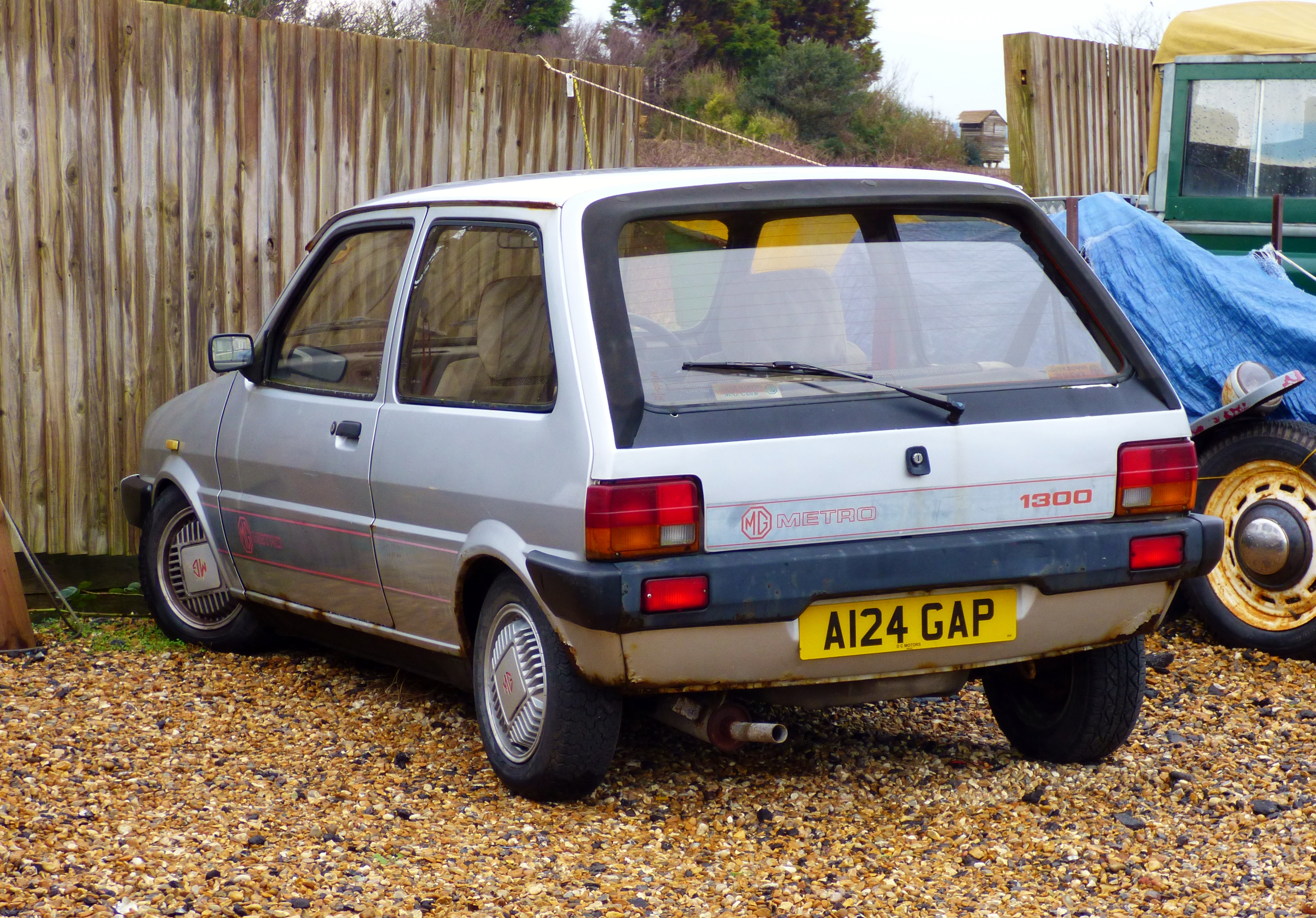
MG Metro 1300 Mk.I (rear view)

The changes between the MG engine (taken directly from the Mini Cooper) and the standard 1275 included a modified cylinder head, with larger valves and improved porting, altered cam profile and larger carburettor leading to a 20% increase in BHP to 72 bhp. At the October 1982 Birmingham Motor Show, the MG Metro Turbo variant was first shown. With a quoted bhp of 93, 0–60 mph in 9.9 seconds, and top speed of 112 mph (180 km/h) this car had few direct competitors at the time, although the growing demand for "hot hatches" meant that it soon had a host of competitors including the Ford Fiesta XR2, Peugeot 205 GTI and Renault 5 GT Turbo. This model had a few addition modifications bolted on over the normally aspirated MG model to give an additional 21 bhp. Aside from the turbocharger and exhaust system itself, and what was (at the time) a relatively sophisticated boost delivery and control system, the MG Turbo variant incorporated stiffer suspension (purportedly with engineering input from Lotus), and an uprated crankshaft of nitrided steel and sodium-cooled exhaust valves.

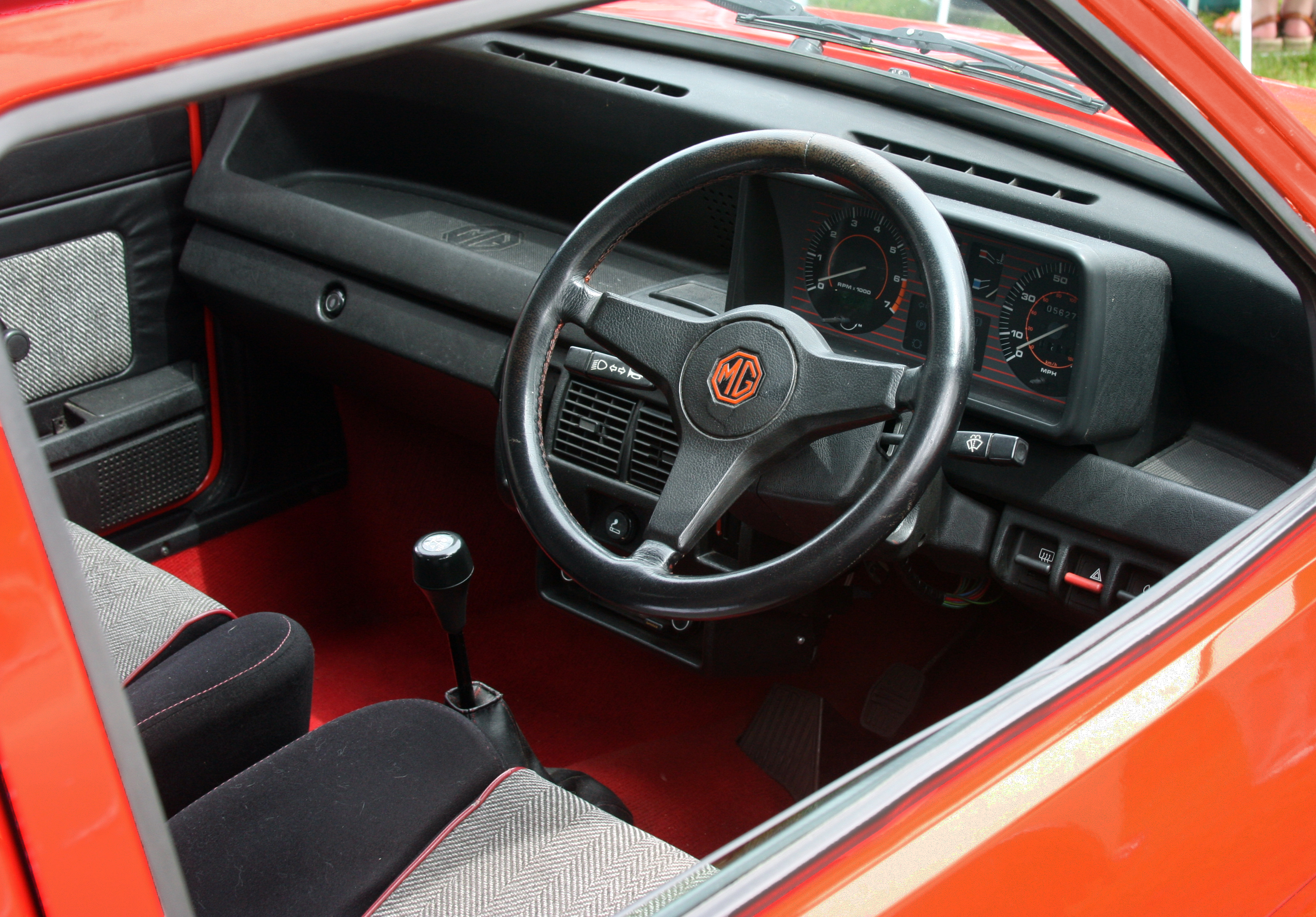
The interior of a 1982 MG Metro Mk. 1; the Mk. 2 featured a much updated and revised interior with controls moved away from the centre console and onto the dashboard.

Both MG variants were given a "sporty" interior with red seat belts, red carpets and a sports-style steering wheel. Early Turbo models also benefitted from a boost pressure gauge: in pre-84 models this was an in-dash LED gauge, relocating to an LCD gauge mounted in an overhead console for early Mk. 2 facelift models (with the boost gauge subsequently being deleted from production in post-85 models). The Turbo also received alloy wheels, wheel arch extensions and front spoiler, and prominent "Turbo" branding. While it retained rear drums, the front disc brakes were changed to ventilated discs, with ventilated front disks being standardised and adopted by all variants from Mk. 2 onwards. Later MG variants were emblazoned with MG branding both inside and out, which only served to fuel claims of badge engineering from some of the more steadfast MG enthusiasts. Others believed that this sentiment was unfounded, particularly in the case of the Turbo variant, due to the undeniably increased performance and handling when compared to the non-MG models.

=== Panel van versions ===
From late 1982, there were also van versions, known as the Morris Metro (under the Morris brand). From late 1985, after BL discontinued use of the Morris name, the van was sold as the Austin Metro 310; after the Austin badge was also dropped from the car models, it became simply the Metrovan 310.

The Van model was the last model of the original Metro to end production at the end of 1990, it was only kept in production because of its popularity with small businesses and a deal between Austin/Rover and BT to supply metro vans.

Rover Group didn't produce a van version of the Rover Metro/100 as they didn't want a Rover branded commercial vehicle.

=== Mark II ===
A Mark II version of the Metro was introduced in 1984. The October facelift saw revised styling modifications to the Metro's front end including much needed colour-coding such as body coloured bumpers on MG versions, wider suspension subframes, along with a new dashboard design featuring the switches and instruments from the Maestro and Montego. The new dashboard was constructed from fewer but larger plastic mouldings, making it easier to assemble and reducing the potential for rattles and other fitting issues. A major part of the facelift was the introduction of a five-door Metro: This provided another strong selling point for the Metro in the 1980s, since not only did it already boast a spacious and practical cabin for its size, but some of its slightly larger competitors, such as the Ford Fiesta and Volkswagen Polo, did not offer the option of five doors at the time. From 1989, just before the Metro was replaced, three-door versions were given a raised fuel filler, this also coincided with the cars being able to run on unleaded petrol due to hardened exhaust valve seats, three years before EEC regulations made it compulsory for all new cars to have a catalytic converter or fuel injection.

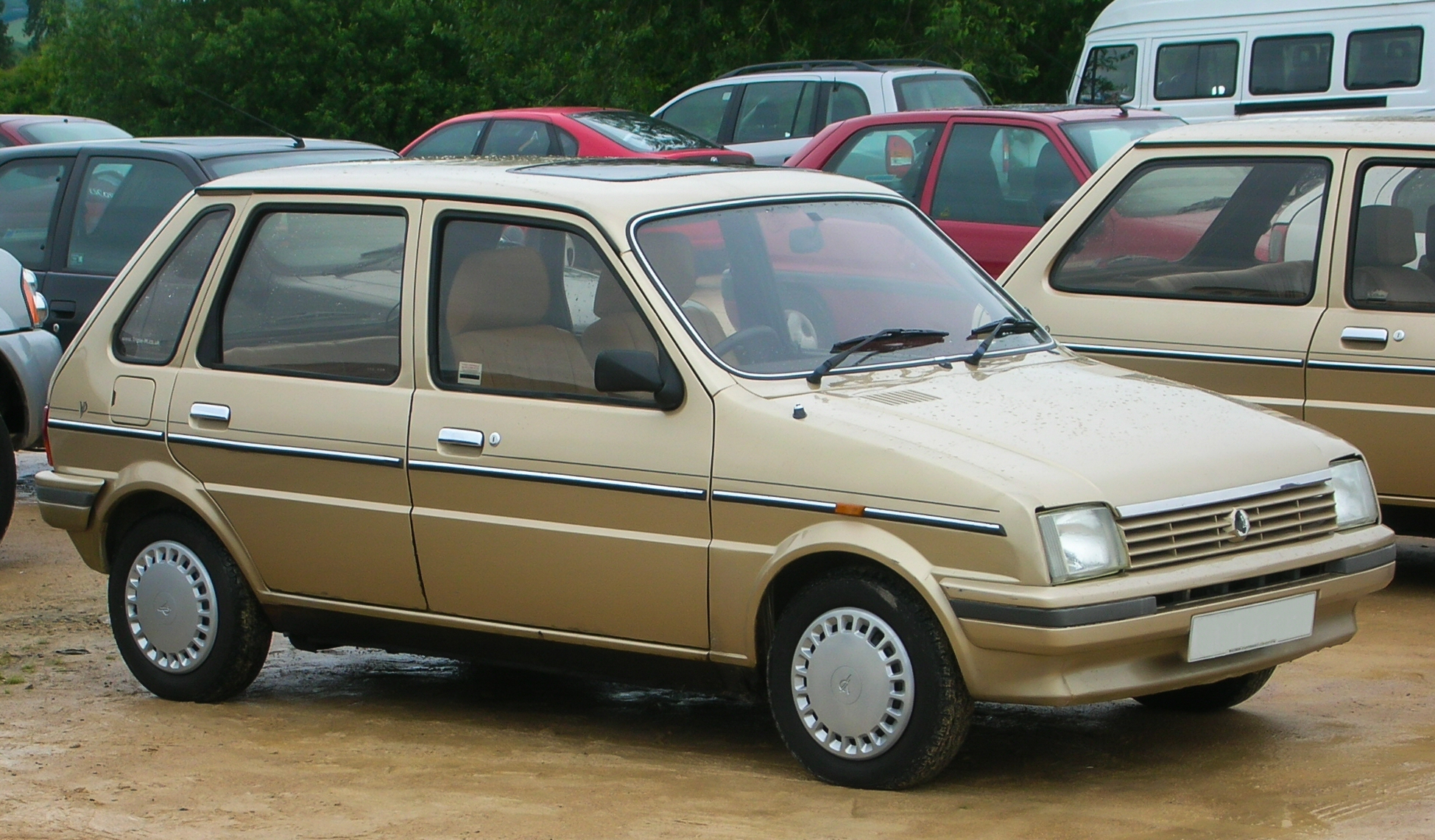
1985 Austin Metro Vanden Plas

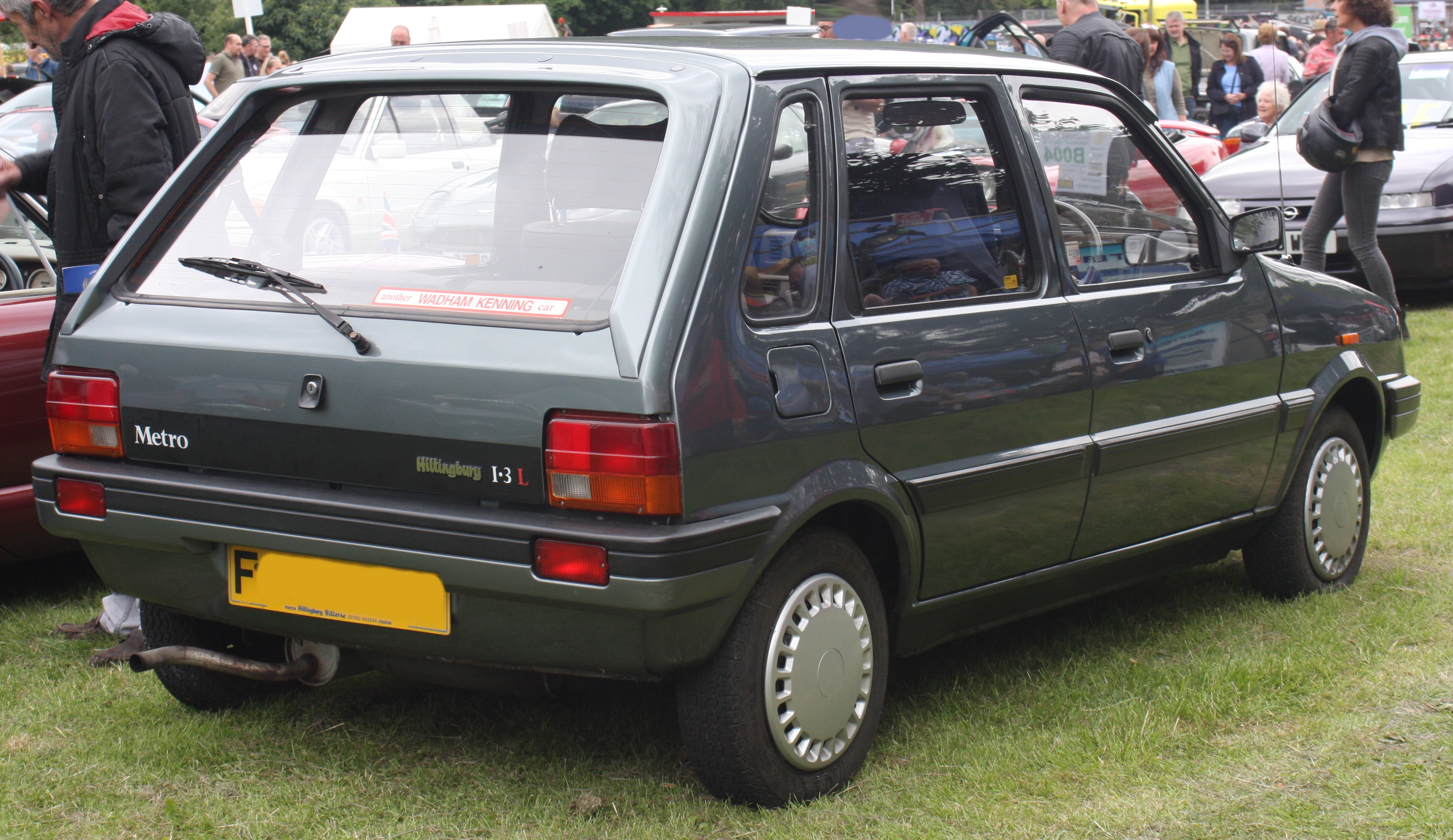
1989 Rover Metro 1.3 (rear view)

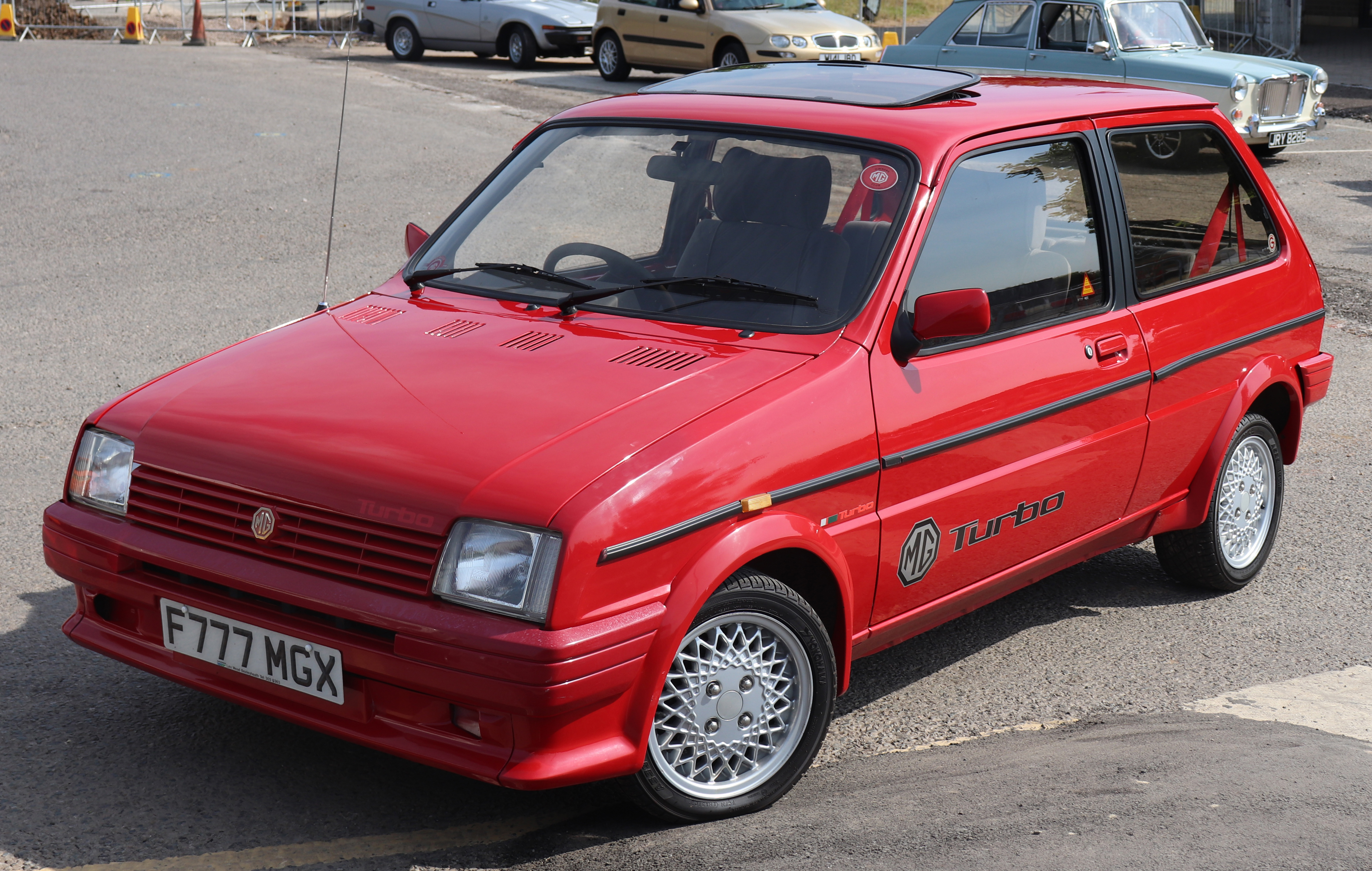
MG Metro 1.3 Mk.II

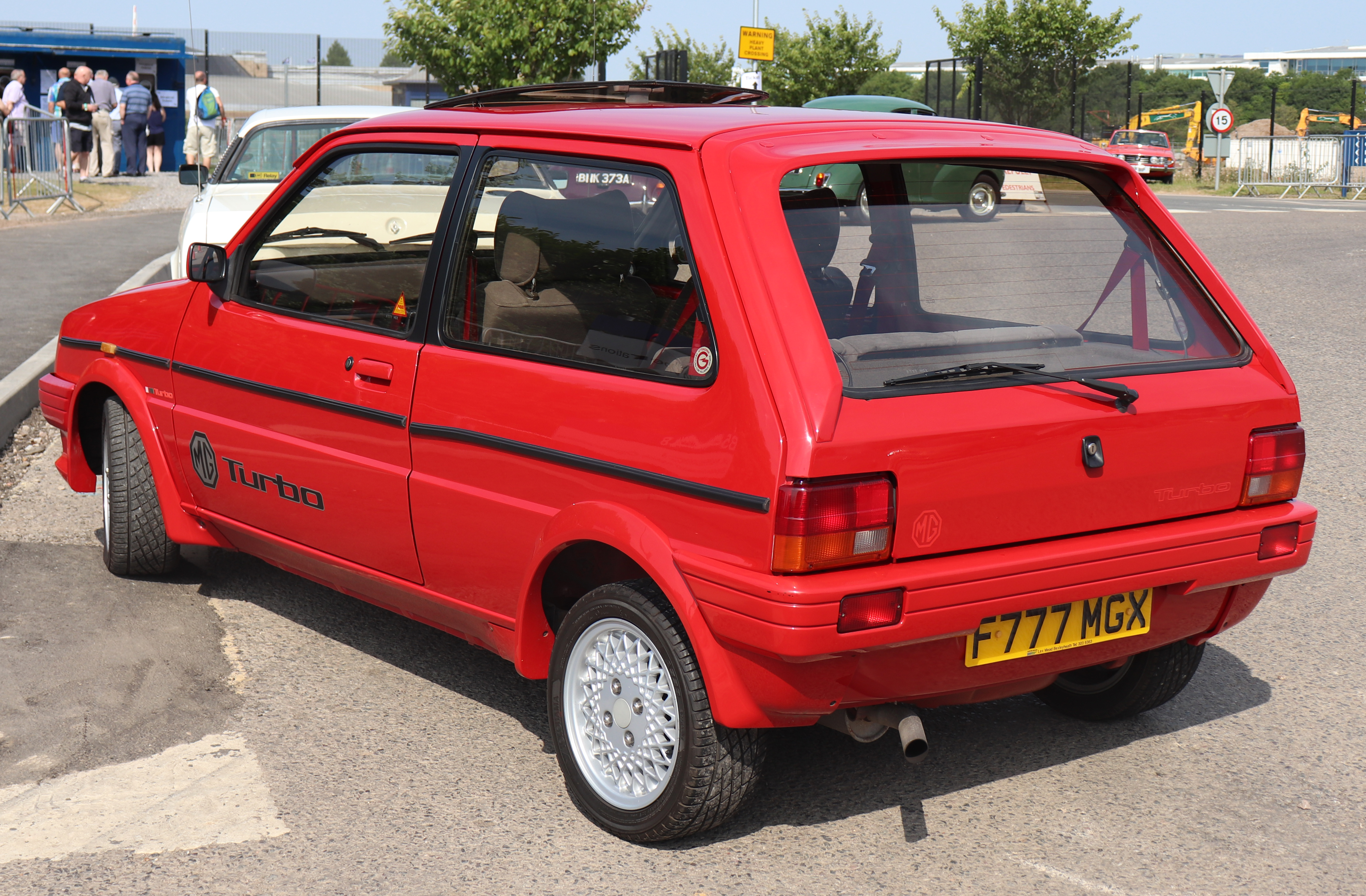
MG Metro 1.3 Mk.II (rear view)

A rear spoiler reduced drag coefficient to increase the Metro's already good fuel economy, and the hydraulic clutch (often berated as the cause of the Metro's particularly harsh gearchange) was replaced by a self-adjusting cable-operated mechanism. The lack of a five-speed gearbox would become a major drawback as time went on; the BMC sump-mounted gearbox was never developed to accommodate an extra gear ratio, which was a severe handicap against the opposition – by the mid-1980s the Ford Fiesta, Peugeot 205, Fiat Uno and Opel Corsa/Vauxhall Nova were all available with a five-speed gearbox on larger-engine models.

At the end of 1987, the Austin marque was shelved. The Austin badge was removed from the cars, which continued to be manufactured with no marque badge, just a model name badge. Rover management never allowed Rover badges on the Montego or the Maestro in their home market, although they were sometimes referred to as "Rovers" in the press and elsewhere. They wore badges that were the same shape as the Rover longship badge, but which did not say "Rover". By this stage, Rover was in the final stages of developing the new Rover 200 Series and Rover 400 Series models in conjunction with Honda, and it was also working on a replacement for the Metro.

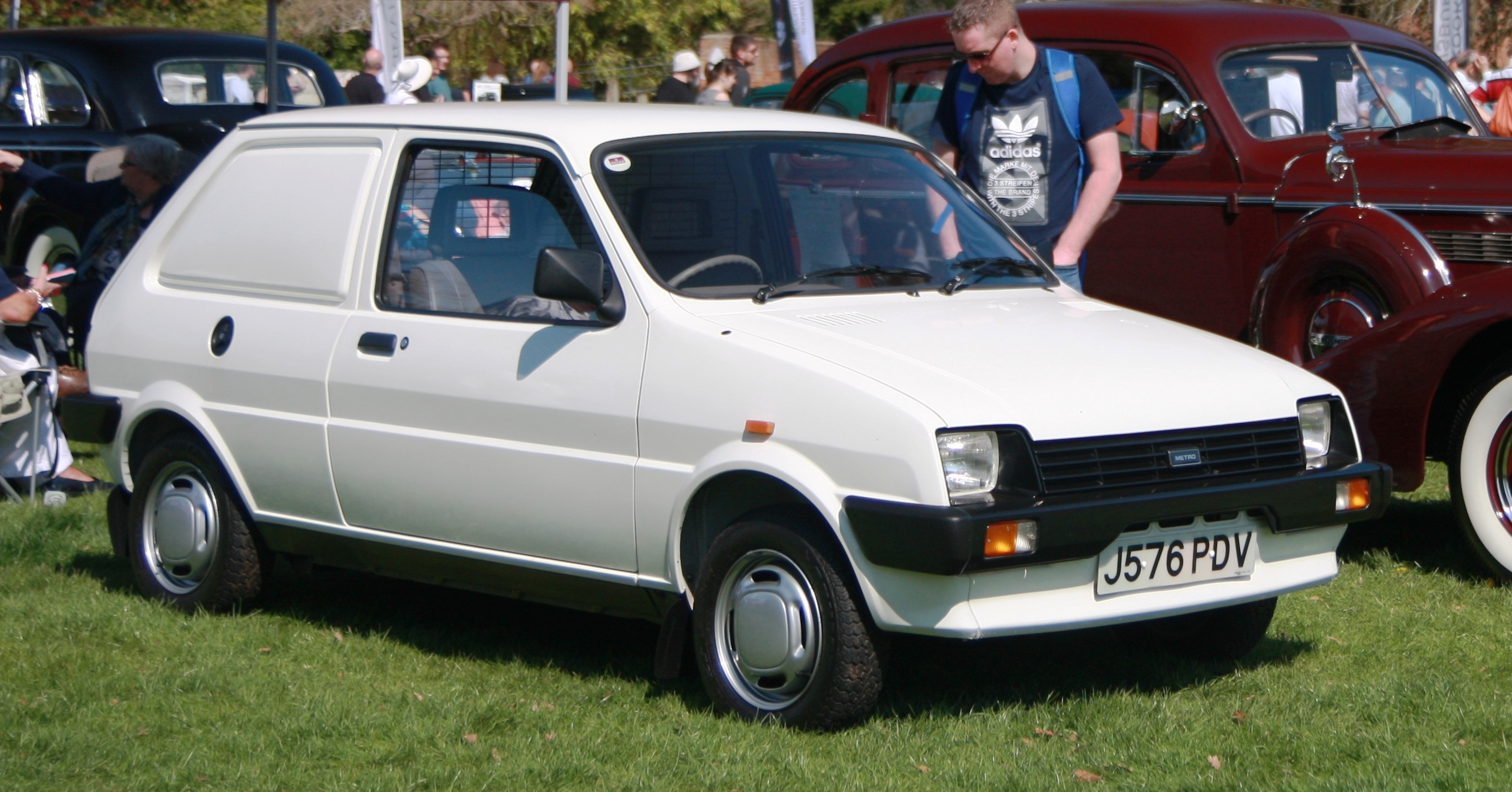
This generation of Metro was still offered as a panel van for some years after the Metro passenger car had been upgraded and renamed as the Rover Metro/100. (seen here: registered in 1992)

It remained on sale in automatic-only form alongside the revised Rover Metro in order to cater for this market need until an automatic transmission version of the newer car was available. Some Mk2 Metros therefore have known to be registered on a J-prefix registration plate (indicating an August 1991 registration date).

== Rover Metro (Mk2; 1990) ==
Rover Metro / 100
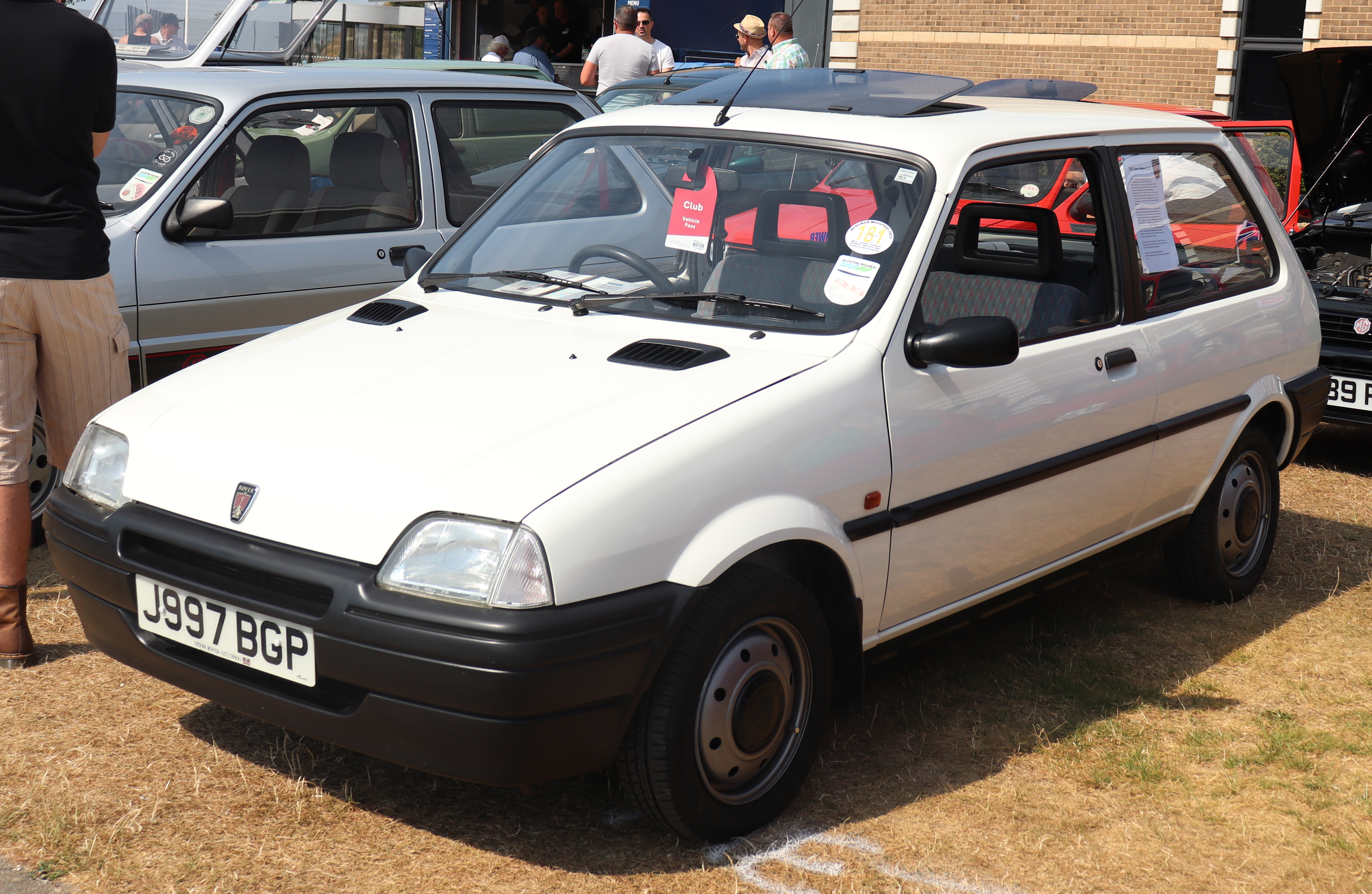

Overview
- Manufacturer: Rover (Rover Group)
- Also called: Rover 100 (Europe)
- Production: 1990–1994

Body and chassis
- Body style: 3-door hatchback 5-door hatchback 2-door convertible
- Layout: Front engine, front-wheel drive
- Platform: R6
- Related: MG F / MG TF

Powertrain
- Engine: 1.1 L K-series 8V I4; 1.4 L K-series 8/16V I4; 1.4 L PSA/TUD3 diesel I4
- Transmission: 4/5-speed PSA manual CVT

Dimensions
- Wheelbase: 88.6 in (2,250 mm)
- Length: 134.1 in (3,406 mm)
- Width: 61.6 in (1,565 mm)
- Height: 53.5 in (1,359 mm)
- Kerb weight: 1,852lbs (840 kg)

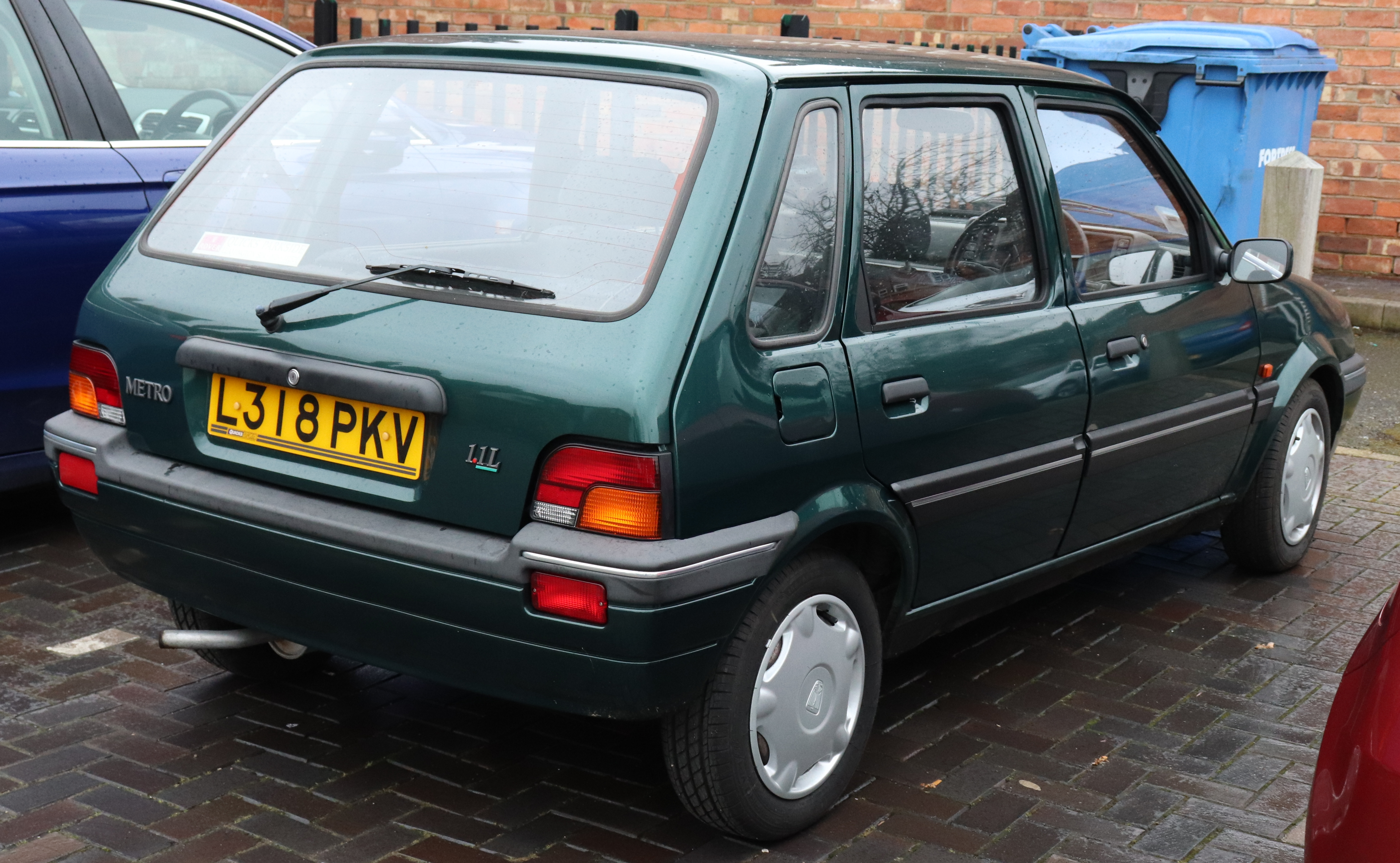
Rear of a Rover Metro

During the 1980s, the media had published photographs of the "Austin AR6" concept car, which would have been a completely new design, but towards the end of the decade the Rover Group decided to restyle and re-engineer the existing Metro design instead. The new Rover Metro using the Rover brand was finally launched in May 1990, being a heavily revised version of the original Metro and fitted with a new range of engines. In many export markets, including Italy and France, the Rover Metro was badged as the Rover 100 series, with the 1.1 known as the Rover 111 and the 1.4 called 114.

The proven 998 cc and 1275 cc A-Series engines (the 1275cc unit was heavily modified and saw service in the classic Mini right up to the end of Mini production in October 2000) gave way to the all-new K-series engine. These were available in 1.1 litre (1118 cc 60 bhp (45 kW)) and 1.4 litre (1396 cc 76 bhp (57 kW)) 8-valve versions, while a 16-valve engine was available in the GTi (early variants are 95 bhp (71 kW) SPi while the later MPi version has 103 bhp) and the early GTa. All models used end-on gearboxes designed jointly by Rover and Peugeot. In 1992, a 1.4 PSA TUD diesel from the Citroën AX and Peugeot 106 was launched; this was the first time the Metro had been available with a diesel engine. At the same time an automatic version was launched with a CVT-type gearbox. The Hydragas suspension was finally modified to accept front to rear interconnection in the way that Alex Moulton had intended, to improve handling and ride quality.

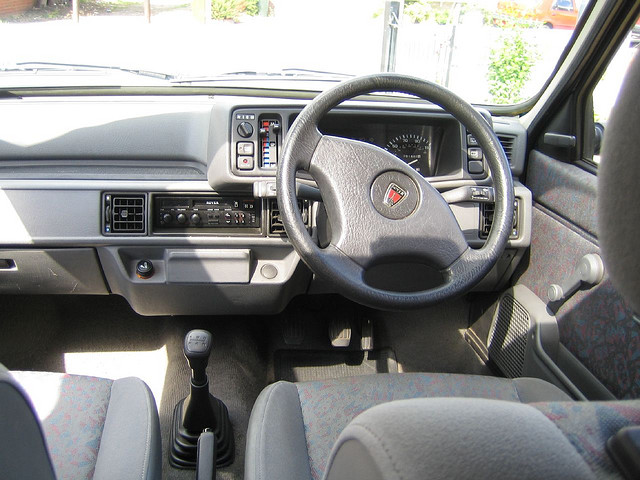
The interior of a 1994 Rover Metro Rio.

A new bodyshell for the replacement car (the AR6 project) was designed. Its styling was influenced by Ital Design, with some similarity to the acclaimed Giorgetto Giugiaro-designed Fiat Punto launched in 1994, and the lower panels of the Peugeot 205, and incorporating the blacked-out pillars and 'floating roof' of the 1989 R8 Rover 200. However, this was cancelled by chairman Graham Day, because British Aerospace (then the Rover Group's new owners) refused to fund it, and the disappointing sales of the Maestro and Montego had not produced expected profits to reinvest. A mockup could be seen at the Canley, Coventry design centre in the 1990s during open days. It appeared as a 'Scoop' photo on the front cover of CAR magazine in the mid-1980s. Project R6, as it became known, would be a more modest update of the 1980 car – the basic bodyshell was retained, but was improved with the addition of new plastic front and rear bumpers, new front wings, new rear lights and bootlid, new front headlamps and bonnet. The interior was altered with a new rounded instrument binnacle and instruments (although the 1984 dashboard moulding remained), new steering wheel, new seats (from the successful Rover 200 series), new door casings and other detail improvements. General build quality, fit and finish was improved enormously from the old Metro and went on to win What Car? "Car of The Year" in 1991.

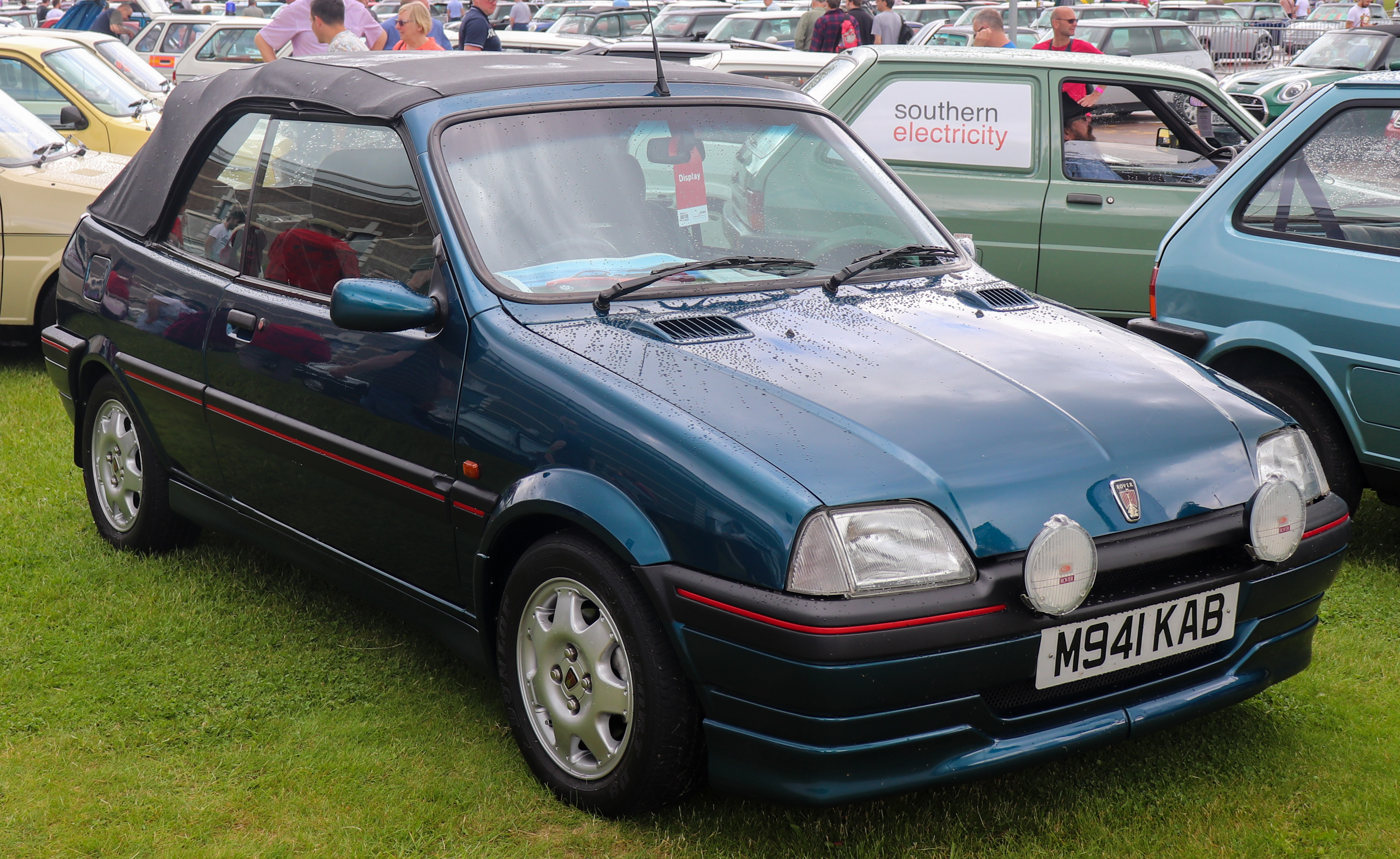
Metro convertible

Latterly this car has attracted an enthusiastic following including use as a low-cost entry to motor racing. The basic just-over-100 bhp (70 kW) engine for the GTI can be boosted to over 130 hp (97 kW) at the flywheel. For ultimate performance the 1.8 K-series engine, with standard cams or VVC (Variable Valve Control) system can be fitted (these engines are found in the MGF and Lotus Elise sports cars, as well as various Rovers and MGs).

== Rover 100 (Mk3; 1995) ==
Rover 100
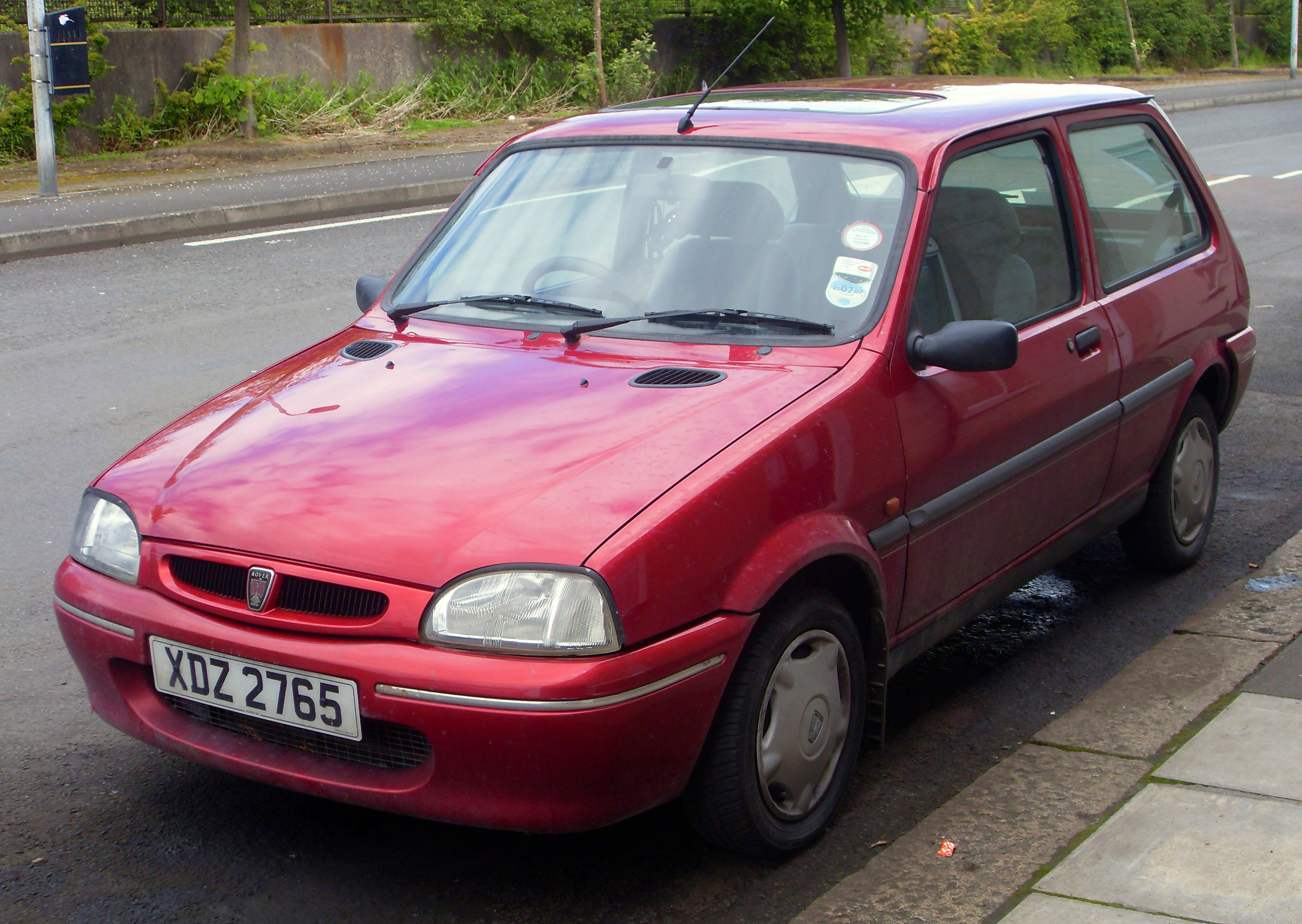

Overview
- Manufacturer: Rover (Rover Group)
- Production: 1994–1997
- Model years: 1995–1998

Body and chassis
- Body style: 3-/5-door hatchback 2-door convertible
- Platform: R6

Powertrain
- Engine: 1.1 L K-series SPI 8V I4; 1.4 SPI K-series 8/16V; 1.4 MPI K-series 8/16V; 1.5 L PSA TUD5 diesel I4
- Transmission: 5-speed PSA manual Van Doorne VT-1 CVT automatic

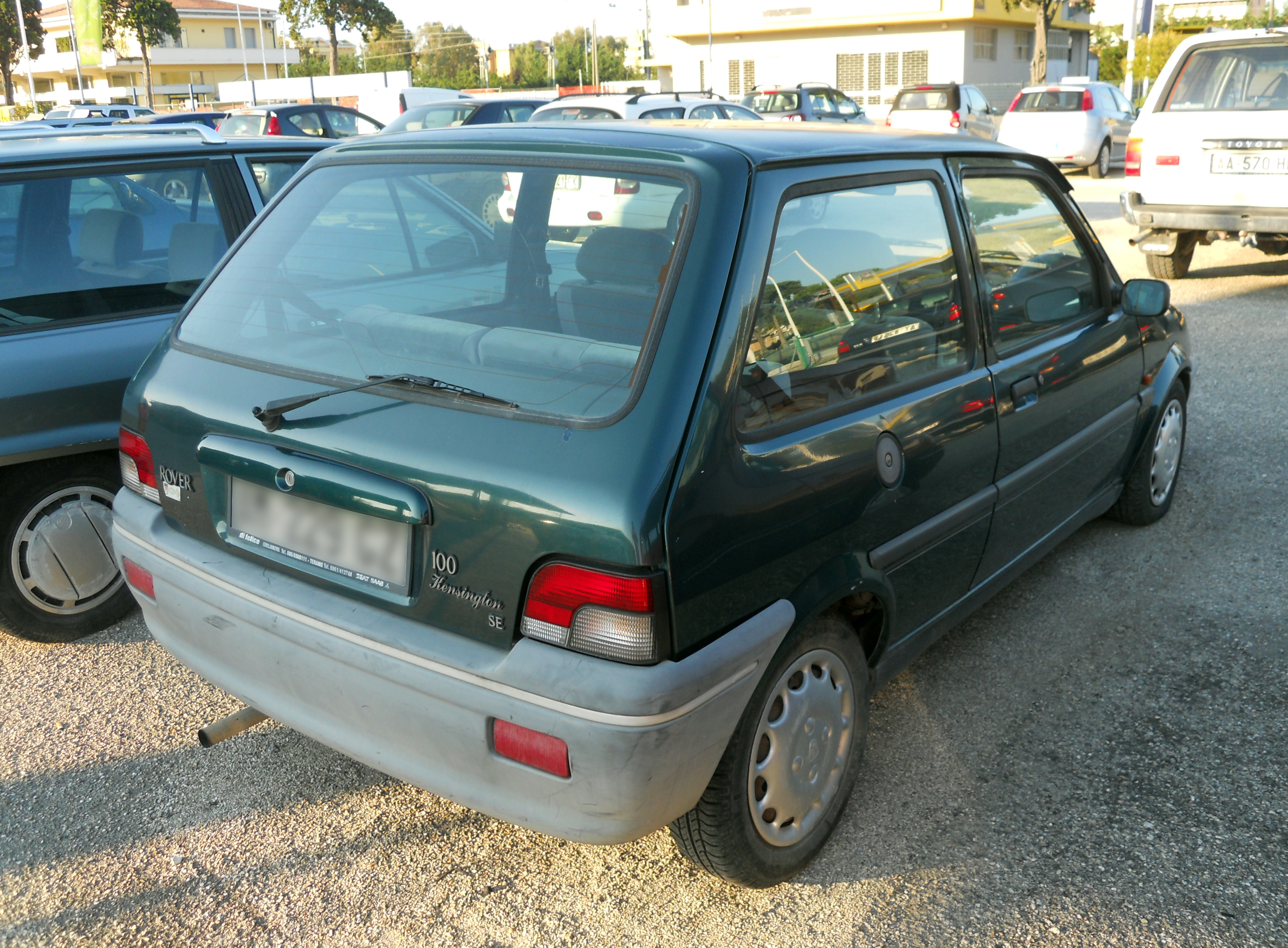
Rover 100 Kensington Rear

In December 1994, a revised Metro model was introduced for the 1995 model year. The Rover Group finally scrapped the well-known Metro nameplate after 14 years, with the Rover 100 name (which had "seen great success in mainland Europe" since the previous model's launch in 1990) introduced in Britain as a replacement. As a result this new model came to be known as the Mk2 Rover 100 on the continent.

The mechanics of the car remained much the same with 1.1 and 1.4 petrol engines and Hydragas suspension, but there was now the option of a Peugeot-sourced 1.5 diesel rather than the previous 1.4. The exterior was altered with a rounder shape in an attempt to disguise the car's age, meet the increased cooling requirements of the Peugeot motor and offer a reduced-format Rover family grille. This was achieved through fitment of new front and rear bumpers, sill covers, rear boot handle and headlamps, bonnet and grille.

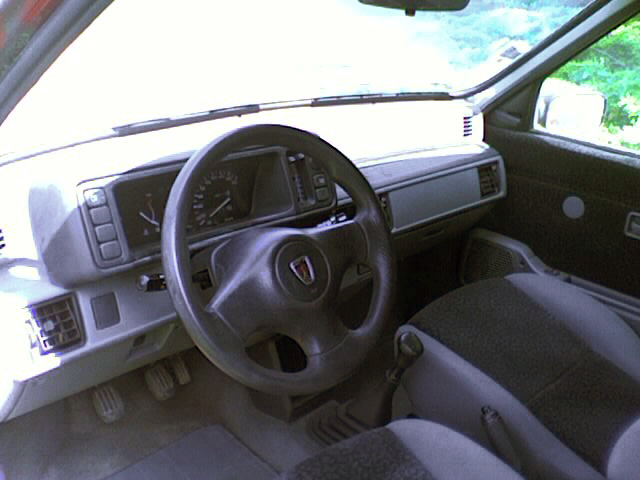
Revised interior of an export left hand drive Rover 100

A variety of bolder paint colours and the use of chrome trim helped give a more upmarket appearance. The interior trim was revised to give a greater impression of quality and luxury, but since the basic architecture had remained unchanged since the original 1980 car, it was considered by many as being short on space and outdated in comparison to its most modern rivals (most of which had been replaced with all-new models since the launch of the Rover Metro, and in the cases of the Ford Fiesta and Vauxhall Nova/Corsa, replaced with all-new models twice). It was criticised by the press for its lack of equipment, with front electric windows only available on the range-topping 114 GSi. Rear electric windows were never an option on the 100. Neither were Anti-Lock Brakes, Power Steering or a rev-counter (except the GTa and later manual 114 GSi models) One for the 100 was a full leather trim, a rarity in a small car and coupled with the standard wood veneer dashboard inserts, a tinted glass sunroof and the optional wood veneer door cappings, the 114 GSi made for traditional luxury motoring; an image Rover was trying to retain. The only safety efforts came in the form of an optional drivers airbag, an alarm, a passive engine immobiliser, a removable radio keypad, central locking and side intrusion beams.

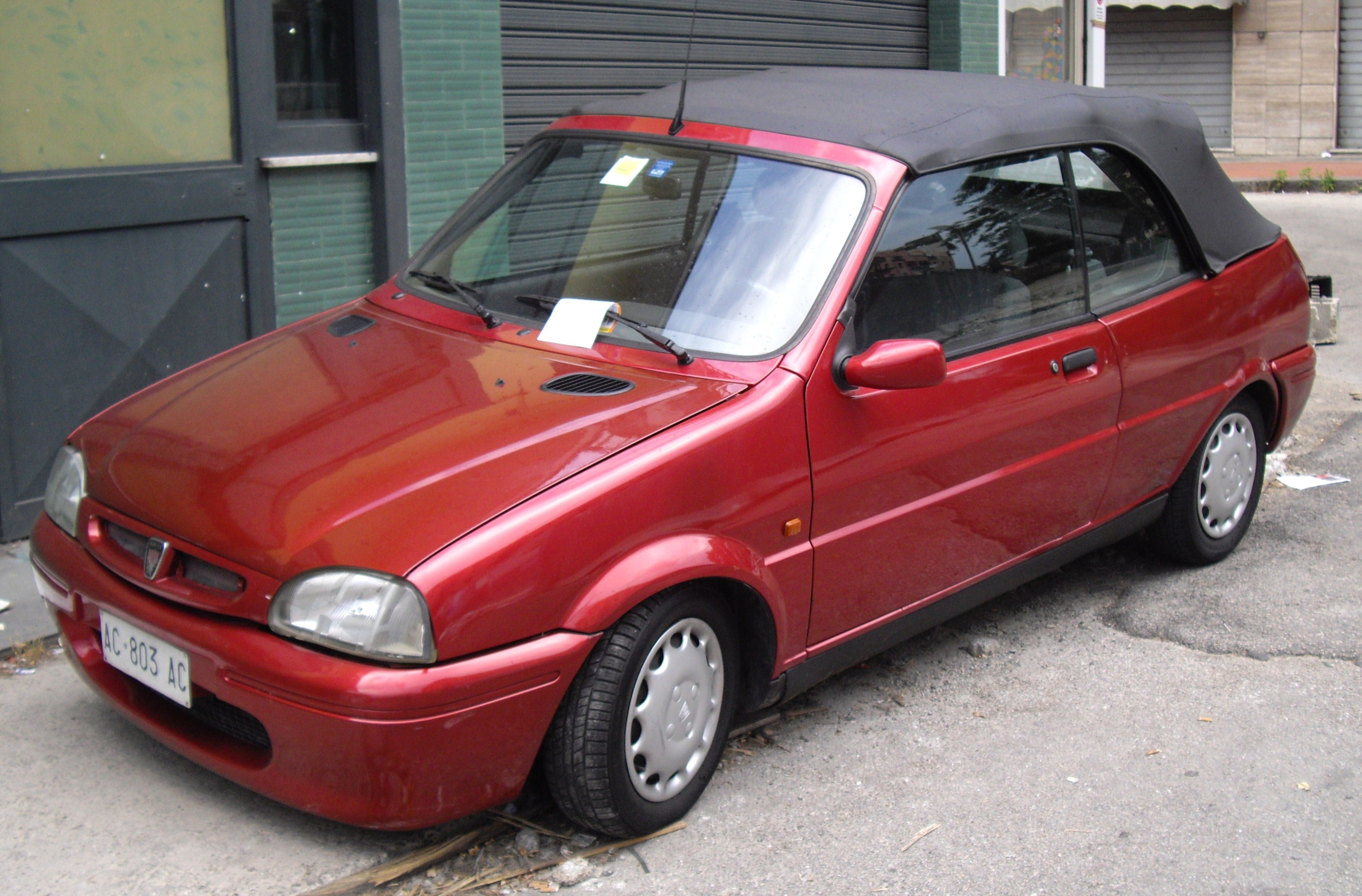
Rover 100 Cabriolèt (Italy)

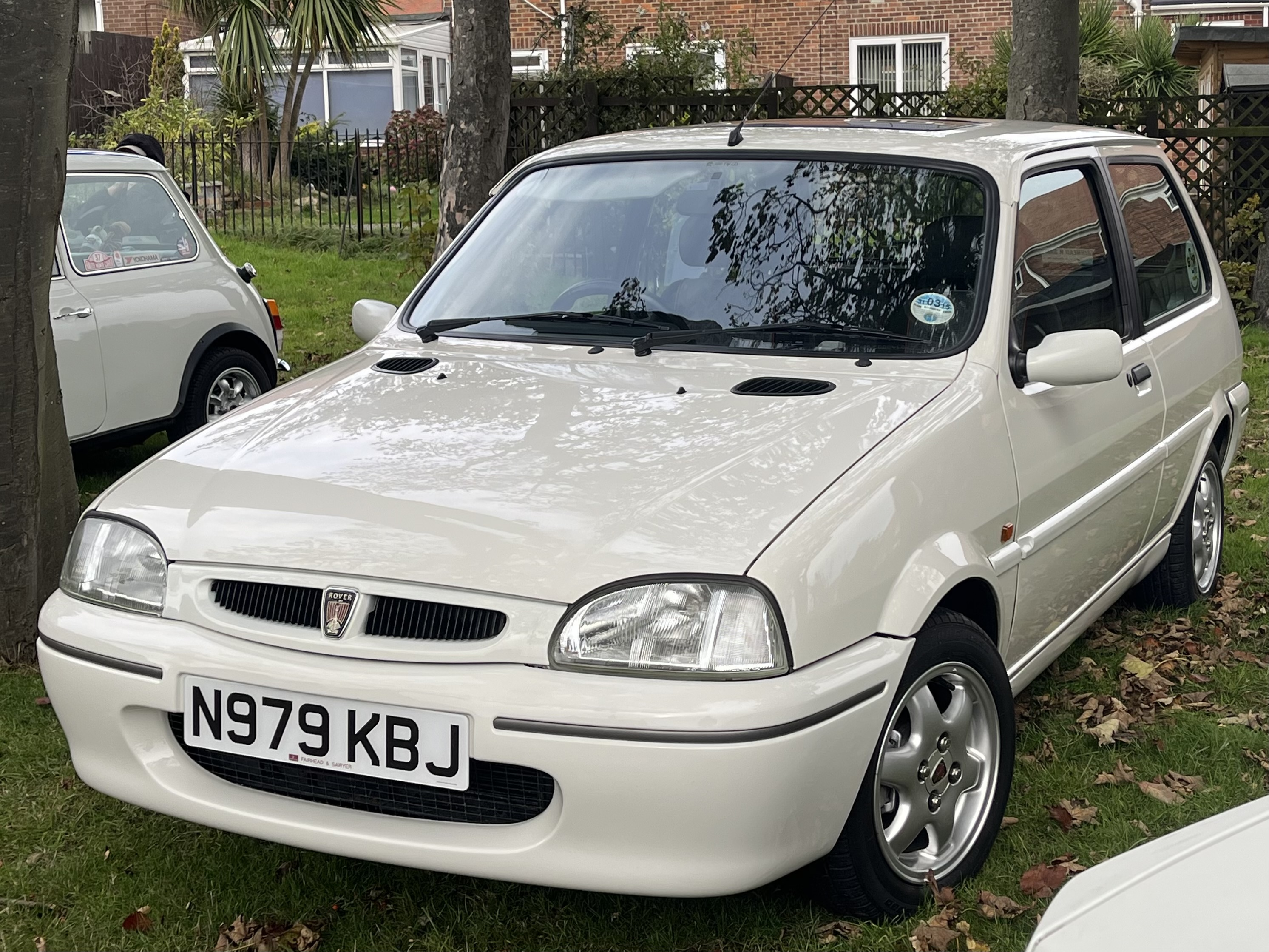
1995 Rover 114 GTa

A version of the 100 called the 114 GTa was available from launch. The main differences over the 114 SLi three-door – which has the same engine – were sports seats, red seatbelts, a rev-counter, sports suspension, a slightly higher top speed, faster acceleration, GSi alloy wheels and GTa badging. It was only available as a three-door.

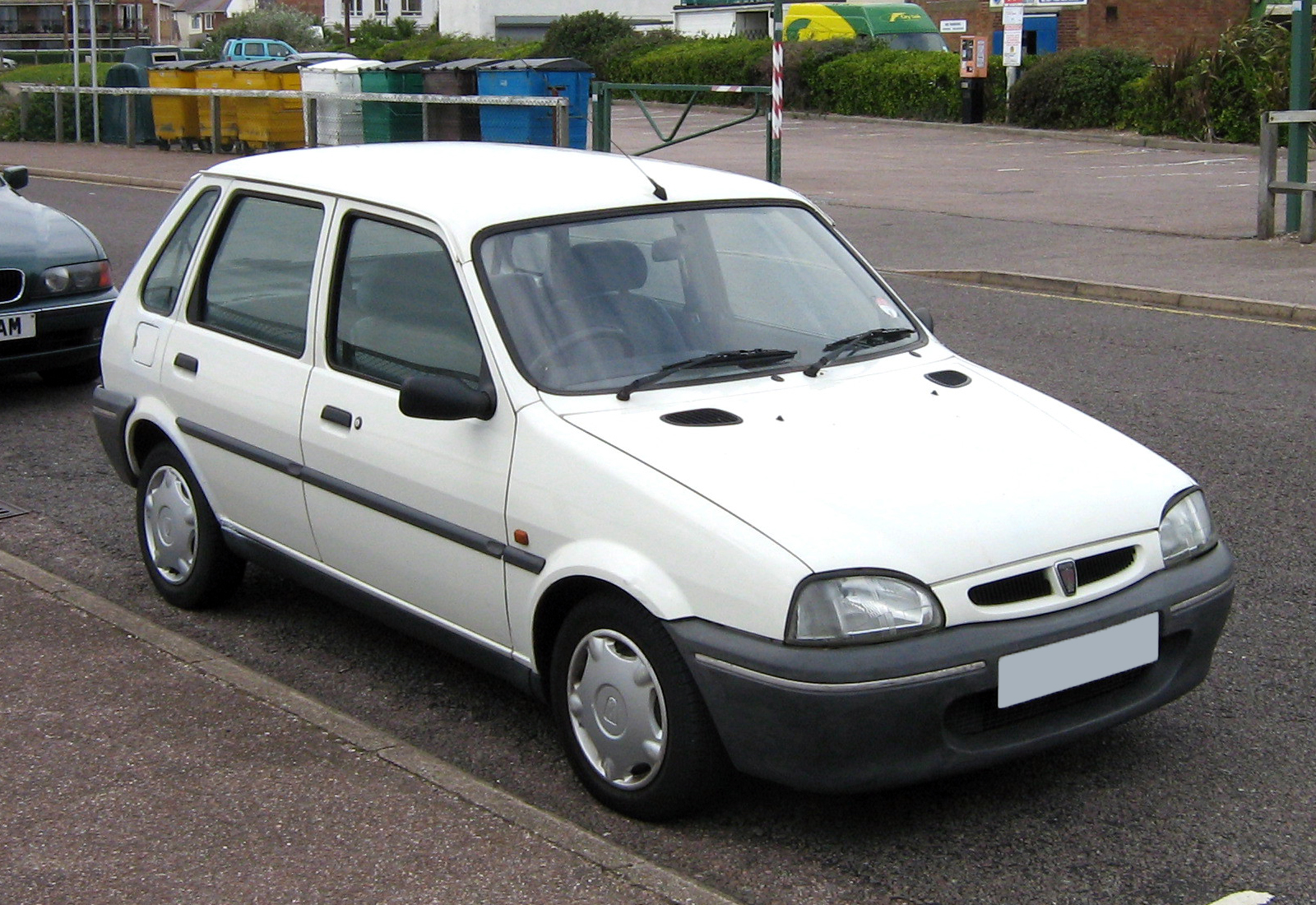
Cheapest versions had no colour-matching bumpers (111i pictured)

=== End of the line ===
In 1997, the Rover 100 gave a poor performance in Euro NCAP crash tests (despite the improved safety features, including side impact bars in the doors and an optional driver's airbag, the 1970s design was showing its age) – it was at the time the only car tested to receive a one-star Adult Occupant Rating. Other small cars tested at the same time received two or three stars out of five. The passenger compartment was subjected to severe structural damage in the frontal-offset test and results showed a high risk of injury to all body regions for the driver. Meanwhile, the side impact test also showed high injury risks.

The Rover 100's dismal safety showing was not its only problem by 1997. It was fast falling behind the best cars in its sector when it came to design, build quality, refinement and specification, although it remained strong in terms of fuel economy and affordability. Unlike the Ford Fiesta, Volkswagen Polo and Vauxhall Corsa, the Rover 100 could still provide sub-£7,000 motoring.

Facing a complete collapse of sales, BMW (owner of the Rover Group) withdrew the 100 from production – marking the end of nearly 18 years of production with the last car built on 23 December 1997.

There was no direct replacement for the Metro/100, although the 1995 Rover 200 had been developed inside Rover Cars to serve as a replacement for the 100 as well as the previous 200 model, which was slightly larger. The 100 and 200 were sold concurrently until 1998, when the 100 was withdrawn. When the Rover 200 was facelifted in late 1999 and rebadged as the Rover 25, Rover marketed this as a supermini reflecting the continued, steady growth of all car classes. The plan was for both the 100 and the 25 to be on the market until the launch of the true replacement for the Metro in the shape of the Mini Hatch.

The gap left by the Metro as a city car was not filled until late 2003, when the Rover CityRover was launched – it was a 1.4 engined city car built in India alongside the Tata Indica. This model was nowhere near as popular as the Metro or the Rover 100. The 100 was not included in the revived product range by Nanjing Automobile following MG Rover's bankruptcy in 2005.

== Powertrains ==
=== 1980 to 1990 ===
All Metros were powered by the 4-cylinder A-Series engine, in 0.85-, 1.0- and 1.3-litre options. Outputs varied depending on year and trim level, with a low-compression 1.0-litre option available on lower-specification models suitable for 2-star petrol, an 0.85-litre option available in some South American countries; no other market existed for this engine size.

- 1980–**: 848 cc A-Series I4, 34 bhp (25 kW; 34 PS) at 5500 rpm and 44 lb⋅ft (60 N⋅m) at 2900 rpm (** = Date last car officially sold is currently unknown)
- 1980–1983: 998 cc A-Series I4, 45 bhp (34 kW; 46 PS) at 5400 rpm and 53 lb⋅ft (72 N⋅m) at 3000 rpm
- 1983–1988: 998 cc A-Series I4, 41 bhp (31 kW; 42 PS) at 5500 rpm and 54 lb⋅ft (73 N⋅m) at 3250 rpm (low compression option)
- 1983–1987: 998 cc A-Series I4, 44 bhp (33 kW; 45 PS) at 5500 rpm and 54 lb⋅ft (73 N⋅m) at 3250 rpm (Metro City)
- 1983–1987: 998 cc A-Series I4, 46 bhp (34 kW; 47 PS) at 5500 rpm and 54 lb⋅ft (73 N⋅m) at 3250 rpm (Metro Standard/City X)
- 1980–1984: 998 cc A-Series I4, 47 bhp (35 kW; 48 PS) at 5500 rpm and 54 lb⋅ft (73 N⋅m) at 3250 rpm (Metro HLE)
- 1987–1990: 998 cc A-Series I4, 47 bhp (35 kW; 48 PS) at 5500 rpm and 54 lb⋅ft (73 N⋅m) at 3250 rpm
- 1980–1983: 1275 cc A-Series I4, 60 bhp (45 kW; 61 PS) at 5250 rpm and 72 lb⋅ft (98 N⋅m) at 3200 rpm
- 1983–1990: 1275 cc A-Series I4, 62 bhp (46 kW; 63 PS) at 5300 rpm and 72 lb⋅ft (98 N⋅m) at 3100 rpm
- 1984–1989: 1275 cc A-Series I4, 71 bhp (53 kW; 72 PS) at 6000 rpm and 75 lb⋅ft (102 N⋅m) at 4000 rpm (Metro Vanden Plas)
- 1982–1989: 1275 cc A-Series I4, 72 bhp (54 kW; 73 PS) at 6000 rpm and 75 lb⋅ft (102 N⋅m) at 4000 rpm (MG Metro)
- 1983–1989: 1275 cc A-Series turbo I4, 93 bhp (69 kW; 94 PS) at 6130 rpm and 85 lb⋅ft (115 N⋅m) at 2650 rpm (MG Metro Turbo)
- 1989–1990: 1275 cc A-Series I4, 69 bhp (51 kW; 70 PS) at 5450 rpm and 75 lb·ft (99 Nm) at 4000 rpm (Metro GTa/MG Metro)

=== 1990 to 1998 ===
Years	Model & Transmission	Engine	Power	Torque	Top Speed	0–62 mph (0–100 km/h)	Economy	Emissions
Petrol
← 1994	Rover Metro 1.1i	1.1 L, 4 in-L	61 PS (45 kW; 60 hp)	90 N·m (66 lb·ft)	97 mph (156 km/h)	13.7 s	46.0 mpg_{‑imp} (6.14 L/100 km)	157 g/km
← 1994	Rover Metro 1.4i 8v	1.4 L, 4 in-L	76 PS (56 kW; 75 hp)	117 N·m (86 lb·ft)	105 mph (169 km/h)	10.5 s	42.9 mpg_{‑imp} (6.58 L/100 km)	165 g/km
← 1994	Rover Metro 1.4i 16v SPI	1.4 L, 4 in-L	96 PS (71 kW; 95 hp)	124 N·m (92 lb·ft)	113 mph (182 km/h)	9.6 s	42.5 mpg_{‑imp} (6.65 L/100 km)	___ g/km
← 1994	Rover Metro 1.4i 16v MPI	1.4 L, 4 in-L	103 PS (76 kW; 102 hp)	123 N·m (91 lb·ft)	116 mph (187 km/h)	8.6 s	42.5 mpg_{‑imp} (6.65 L/100 km)	___ g/km
1994 →	Rover 111i	1.1 L, 4 in-L	61 PS (45 kW; 60 hp)	90 N·m (66 lb·ft)	97 mph (156 km/h)	13.7 s	46.0 mpg_{‑imp} (6.14 L/100 km)	157 g/km
1994 →	Rover 114i 8v	1.4 L, 4 in-L	76 PS (56 kW; 75 hp)	117 N·m (86 lb·ft)	105 mph (169 km/h)	10.5 s	42.9 mpg_{‑imp} (6.58 L/100 km)	165 g/km
1994 →	Rover 114i 8v Automatic	1.4 L, 4 in-L	76 PS (56 kW; 75 hp)	117 N·m (86 lb·ft)	100 mph (160 km/h)	11.1 s	41.4 mpg_{‑imp} (6.82 L/100 km)	___ g/km
1994 →	Rover 114i 16v SPI	1.4 L, 4 in-L	96 PS (71 kW; 95 hp)	124 N·m (92 lb·ft)	113 mph (182 km/h)	9.6 s	42.5 mpg_{‑imp} (6.65 L/100 km)	___ g/km
1994 →	Rover 114i 16v MPI	1.4 L, 4 in-L	103 PS (76 kW; 102 hp)	124 N·m (92 lb·ft)	116 mph (187 km/h)	8.6 s	42.5 mpg_{‑imp} (6.65 L/100 km)	___ g/km
Diesel
← 1994	Rover Metro 1.4 D	1.4 L, 4 in-L	53 PS (39 kW; 52 hp)	83 N·m (61 lb·ft)	88 mph (142 km/h)	16.8 s	56.0 mpg_{‑imp} (5.04 L/100 km)	___ g/km
1994 →	Rover 115 D	1.5 L, 4 in-L	57 PS (42 kW; 56 hp)	95 N·m (70 lb·ft)	96 mph (154 km/h)	15.3 s	56.0 mpg_{‑imp} (5.04 L/100 km)	___ g/km

== MG Metro 6R4 rally car ==
MG Metro 6R4
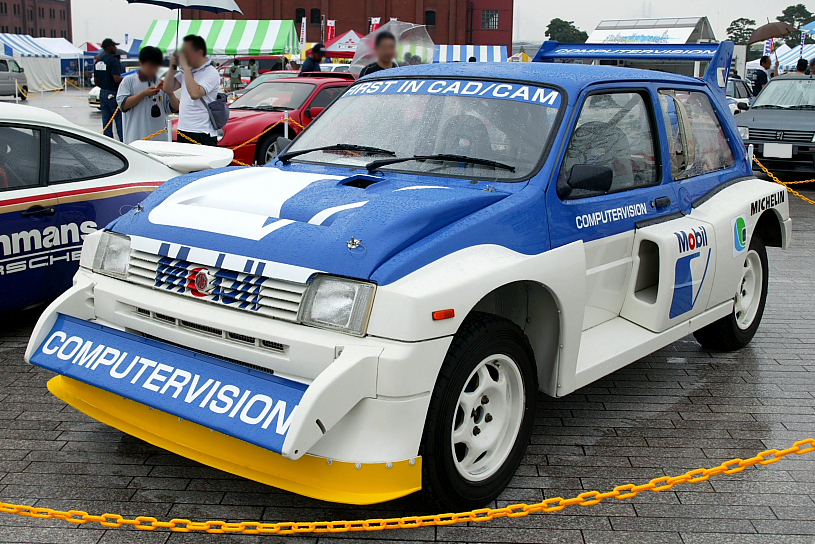

Overview
- Manufacturer: Austin Rover Group, Austin Rover World Rally Team
- Production: 1984–1987
- Designer: John Davenport (director, Austin Rover Group Motorsport); Patrick Head (chief designer, Williams Grand Prix Engineering); Brian O'Rourke (structure, bodywork); John Piper (layout, transmission, suspension); David Wood (engine); Bob Farley (engine); Ian Anderson (fabrication); Derek Jones (machining)

Body and chassis
- Body style: 3-door hatchback
- Layout: Rear mid-engine, four-wheel drive
- Platform: LC8
- Related: MG Metro

Powertrain
- Engine: 2,991 cc (182.5 cu in) V64V 90° V6 DOHC bore and stroke of 92 by 75 millimetres (3.6 in × 3.0 in)
- Power output: 250–410 bhp (186–306 kW) dependent upon spec
- Transmission: 5-speed manual

Dimensions
- Wheelbase: 2,391 mm (94.1 in)
- Length: 3,657 mm (144.0 in)
- Width: 1,836 mm (72.3 in)
- Height: 1,650 mm (65 in)
- Curb weight: 1,040 kg (2,290 lb)

Created for the short-lived Group B rally category, the 4WD mid engined MG Metro 6R4 of 1984 (standing for 6-cylinder, Rally, 4-wheel-drive) had almost no commonality with the regular production Metro with which it bears a superficial cosmetic resemblance. The competition car effectively only shared the name of the production Metro as it featured a mid-mounted engine with four-wheel drive transmission enclosed within a semi-monocoque seam-welded tubular chassis. The development of this vehicle had been entrusted to Williams Grand Prix Engineering.

The resulting car was shown to the world in May 1985. It was powered by a David Wood designed bespoke 3-litre V6 powerplant which used some of the engine architecture of the Cosworth DFV. It featured twin overhead camshafts and four valves per cylinder. The engine was not turbocharged as the majority of its competitors were, which considered the Metro as "unique." The engine was mounted back to front in the car, with the forward end of the engine facing the hatchback and the gearbox attached conventionally behind it and, therefore, in the middle of the vehicle. The four-wheel-drive was permanently engaged, and drove separate prop shafts to the front and rear differentials. The rear differential was mounted on the side of the engine sump with one driveshaft running through the sump to the nearside rear wheel. Much of the outer bodywork was made of GRP, with the only exception being the roof panels (which were aluminium), the steel doors, and the remaining panels from the original Metro shell. The doors were, however, concealed by plastic airboxes. Indeed, models now on show generally have stickers demonstrating where it is safe to push from when moving the vehicle, so as not to damage the bodywork.

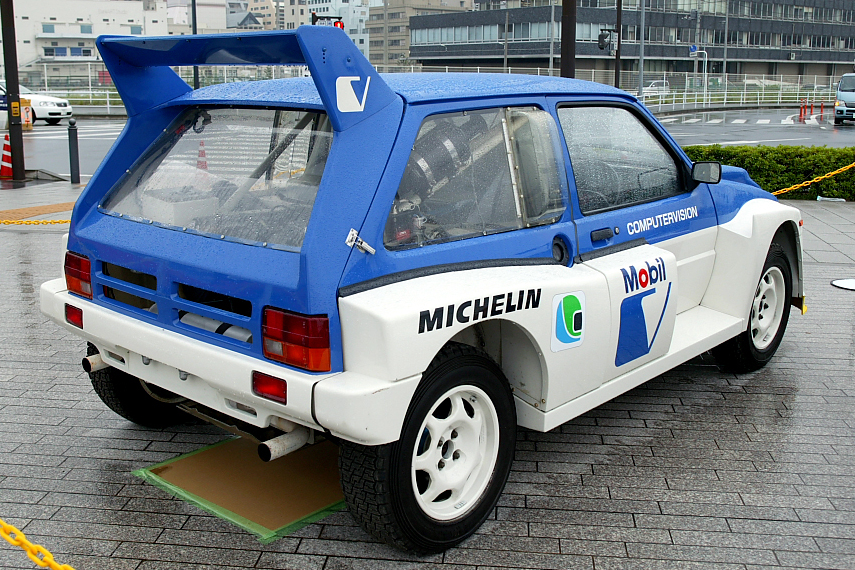
Rear

The 6R4 appeared in two guises. There was a so-called Clubman model which was the road going version which developed in the region of 250 bhp (186 kW), of which around 200 were made and sold to the public for £40,000 (the homologation version). A further 20 were taken and built to International specifications which had a recorded output of over 410 bhp (306 kW; 416 PS)

At its launch in 1985, Rover announced that it would complete the necessary number of cars required for homologation by November of that year. This was undertaken at the group's large manufacturing facility at Longbridge. The car was to participate in the Lombard RAC rally in November 1985, and an example, driven by works driver Tony Pond, finished a highly respectable third, behind two Lancia Delta S4s.

This good start was unfortunately not repeated, and although a 6R4 was entered in rallies at Monte Carlo, Sweden, Portugal and Corsica during the 1986 season, none of the Metros managed to complete a course. The majority of these problems were related to the V6 powerplant which suffered teething issues. Halfway during the 1986 season, Group B was banned (following a series of fatal crashes in which both competitors and spectators lost their lives). From that point on, the 6R4 was always going to be limited in front line competition, although they were run with limited success for the remainder of the year. A number passed into private hands and have proved formidable rally and rallycross cars. Despite the expiry of the 6R4's homologation the MSA still allow the cars to run in competition although engine sizes have been limited to 2800cc (single plenum engines) and 2500cc (multi-plenum engines).

Austin Rover withdrew from the rallying scene at the end of the season, but in 1987, all the parts and engines were sold to Tom Walkinshaw Racing, whereupon the V6 engine reappeared in the Jaguar XJ220, this time with turbochargers added.

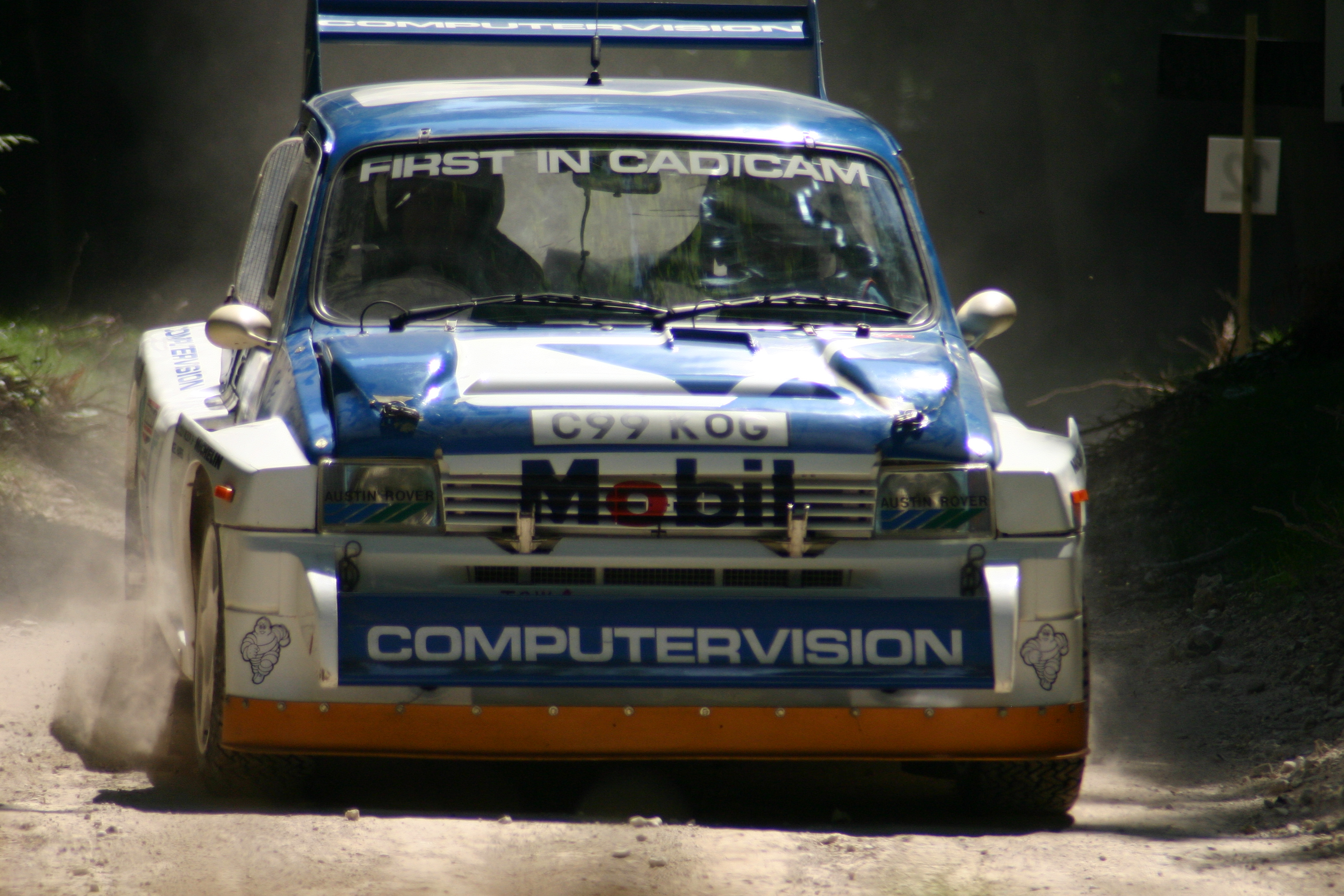
Rover Metro 6R4 at the 2005 Goodwood Festival of Speed

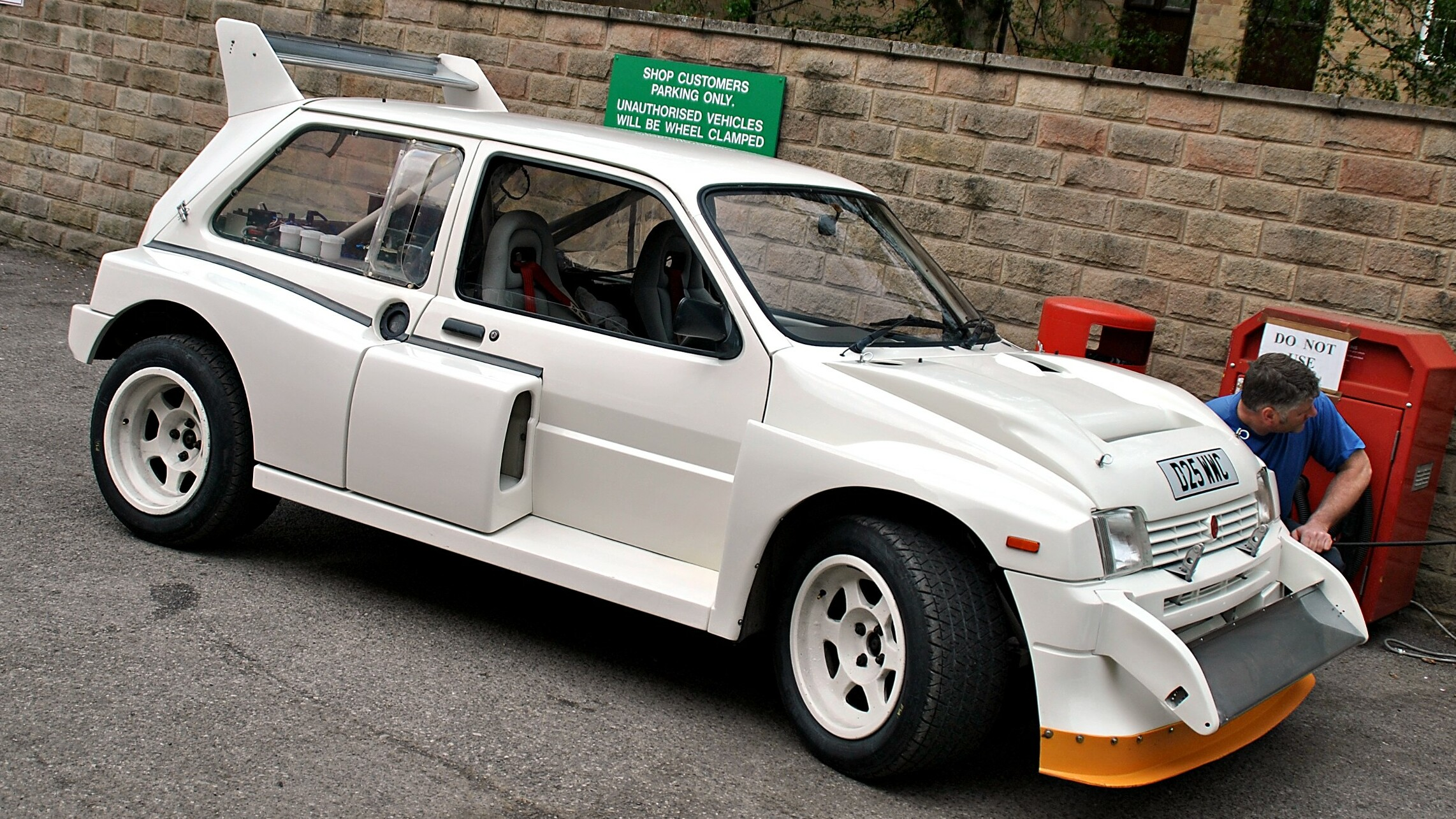
MG Metro 6R4 Clubman road-going street homologation version

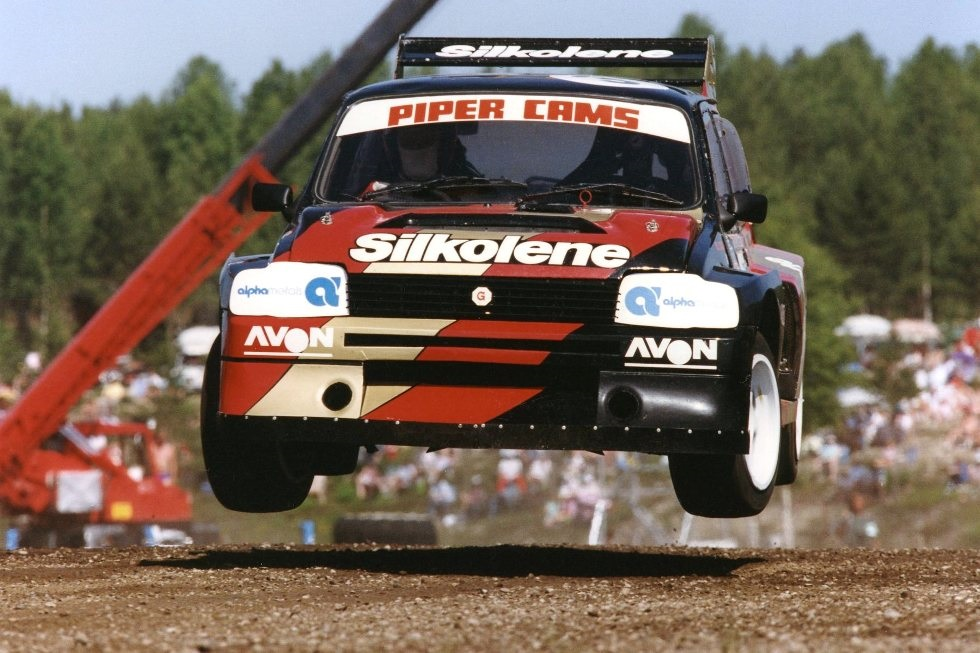
Will Gollop used his MG Metro 6R4 BiTurbo to claim the FIA European Rallycross Championship title in 1992

== Motorsport ==
=== Touring Car Racing ===
The Metro was popular in the lower classes of Touring cars throughout the 1980s.

It made its debut in 1981, competing in both the British Touring Car Championship and the European Touring Car Championship and was still appearing as late as 1990 in the Italian Championship.

=== MG Metro Challenge ===
In 1981, the Metro Challenge was introduced, it was later renamed the MG Metro Challenge for 1983 and then the MG Metro Turbo Challenge for 1987. The series ran until the end of the 1990 season.

The series was popular with then-current and future Touring car drivers, with Steve Soper becoming the series' inaugural Champion and future British Touring Car Champion Tim Harvey making his tin-top racing debut in the 1984 Season.

The series spawned an International Championship for the 1986 Season, and is also known to have spawned a European and Italian Championship.

The 1987 Season was notable for former Featherweight Boxing Champion Barry McGuigan joining the series, and also featured cameo appearances from future F1 Drivers Bertrand Gachot, Johnny Herbert, and future World Champion Damon Hill.

A novelty of the series was the Celebrity Car, and in the 1989 Season this status applied to the #89 car. Notable people to drive this car included future British Touring Car Champion Will Hoy.

=== Austin Rover Rallysprint ===
In 1983, and 1984, the MG Metro was used for the Autotest Time Trial Stage of the Austin Rover Rallysprint at Donington Park. Nigel Mansell (1983) and Marc Duez (1984) were the overall winners.

For 1985, the Metro 6R4 was used for the Rally Stage event. This time, the overall victor was Stig Blomqvist.

=== MG Metro Super Challenge ===
A one-make series for Metro 6R4s ran during the 1988 and 1989 seasons. Tony Pond was a notable guest entry in this series.

=== MG Metro Cup ===
The MG Metro Cup started in 1992 and continues as of 2025.

=== Northern Irish Metro Championship ===
British Touring Car legend Colin Turkington won his first motor racing title in a Metro in his native Northern Ireland in 1998.

== Popularity ==
=== Sales ===
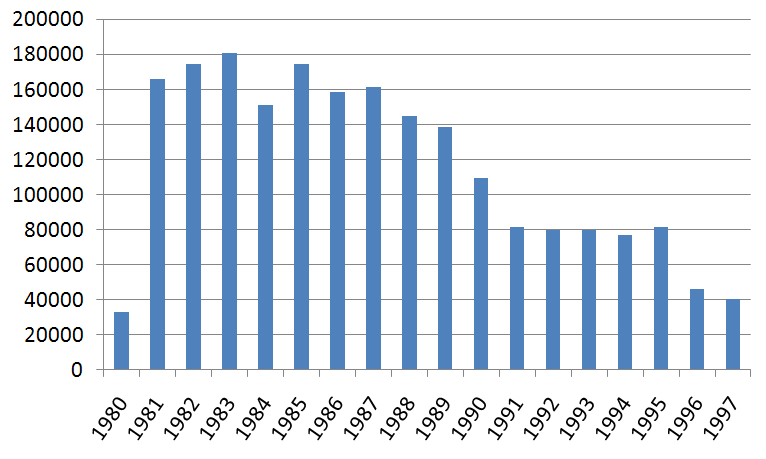
Metro production (1980–1997)

The Metro remained one of Britain's most popular cars throughout its production life, even during its final year when it was among the oldest designs on sale in the country. Including the post-1994 Rover 100 Series models, a total of just under 1,500,000 Metros were sold in Britain in less than twenty years, making it the seventh-most popular car ever sold there.

During its early years, the Austin Metro was Britain's most popular small car; often outselling the Ford Fiesta. The Mk. 3 Ford Escort (1980–1986) was the only model to outsell it in Britain throughout the 1980s, and by December 1989 only the Mk. 3 Ford Escort was a more common model on British roads. However, the first three generations of Ford Fiesta combined outnumbered it by this stage. It was still one of Britain's best selling cars by the time it was replaced by the Rover 100 in late 1994, with almost 1,500,000 having been sold (an average of more than 100,000 per year). However, despite reasonable numbers being sold in France and Italy, overall sales in Europe were modest in comparison to established rivals such as the Fiesta (which typically sold 500,000 units per year across Europe), meaning that BL still could not realise the true economies of scale.

Lady Diana Spencer (later Diana, Princess of Wales) owned a red W-registered Metro before her engagement to the then-Prince Charles. This car is in the Museum of British Road Transport, Coventry.

=== Awards ===
The MG version of the Metro was named "Car of The Year" 1983 by What Car? magazine and later once more as the Rover Metro in 1991.

=== Legacy ===
Much debate among automotive historians has taken place over whether BL's decision to push the Metro's development programme ahead of the potentially more profitable Maestro/Montego models was justified. As a result of this, both those models did not arrive on the market until 1983/84, after having been in development since 1976 with a view of being launched around 1980. By the time of their launch, they were soon out of step both stylistically and from an engineering perspective when compared to the market-leading cars in their sectors.

The Metro's popularity endured in spite of its failure to match the durability of its contemporary rivals, notably the Nissan Micra (K10) and VW Polo Mk. 2. This is well illustrated by the findings of Auto Express's 2006 survey which named the Metro as Britain's seventh-most scrapped car of the last thirty years. Just 21,468 versions of the original 1980–1990 Metro were still in working order at the time of the survey, despite around 1,000,000 being sold. Nearly seven years on, that figure has inevitably declined further, with the number remaining as of 2013 now down to less than 2,000.

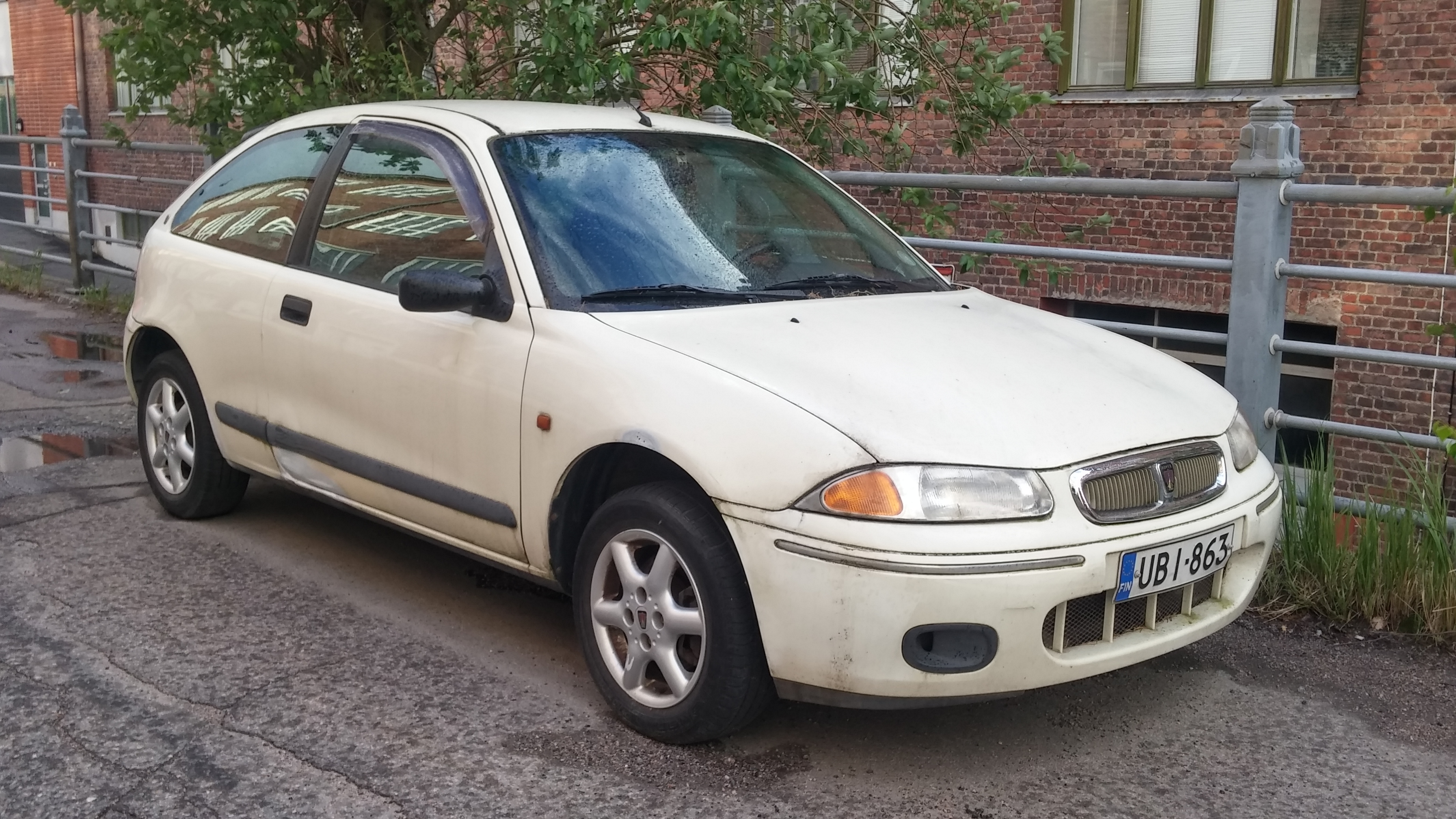
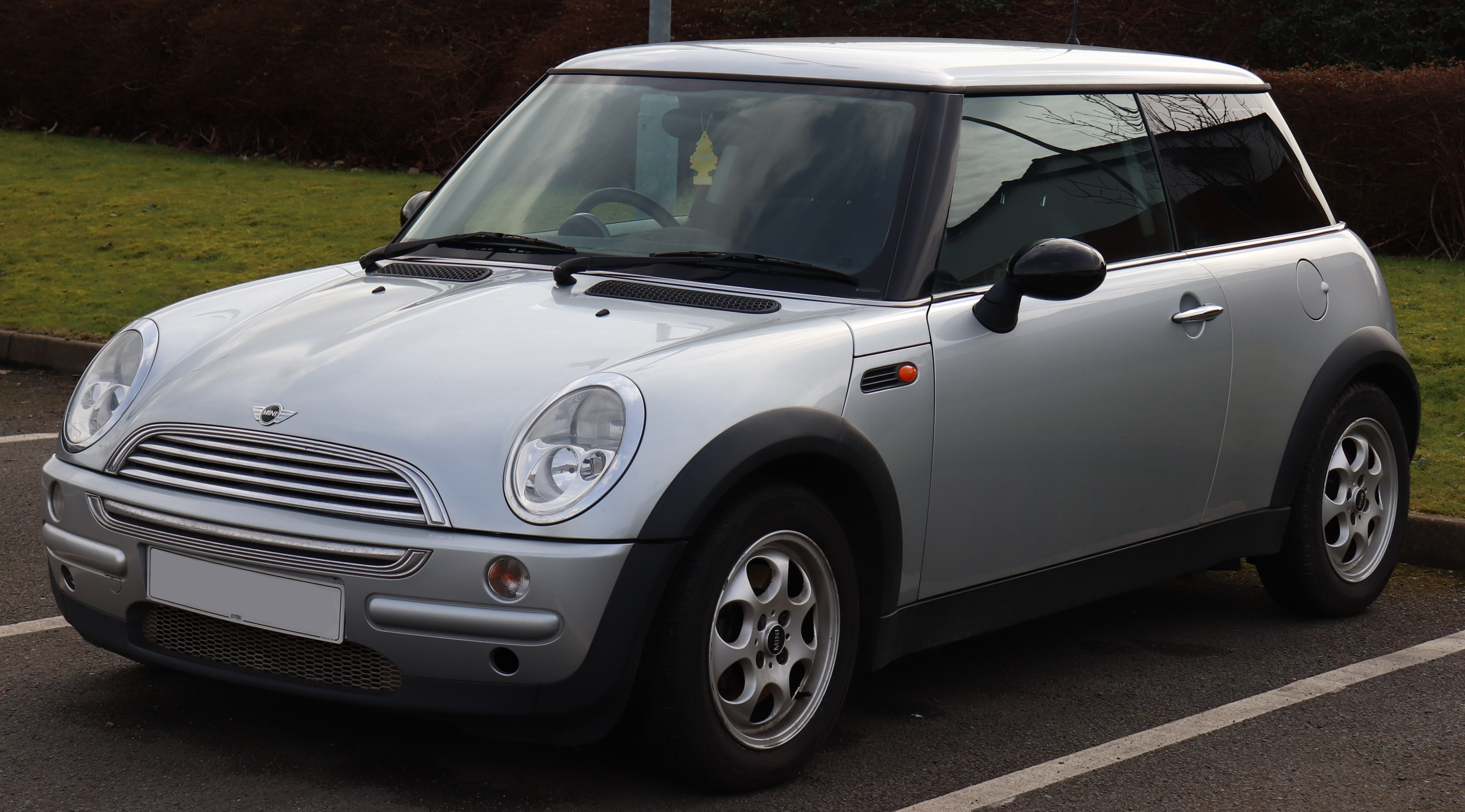
The Metro's spiritual successors: Rover 200 (Mk III) and Mini Hatch (BMW)

Many Metros (particularly the pre-1990 Austin models) have been scrapped as a result of the bodyshell's vulnerability to rust. Pre-1989 cars could not run on unleaded fuel either without expensive conversion of the cylinder head or the use of additives. When lead replacement petrol was withdrawn from sale in 1997 many owners simply scrapped the cars. Metros built before 1990 use the same engine and transmission package as the Mini, hence they have become popular donor cars for Mini restorations and Mini-based kit cars; and as a result, thousands of Metros were dismantled purely for their engines and gearboxes to keep classic Minis on the road. Many Metros were written off by joyriders, as the car's minimal security made it notoriously easy to steal. The post-1990 cars were not without their problems - the K-Series engine became notoriously prone to cylinder head gasket failure (and if the engines overheated then they were often damaged beyond repair), and the bodyshell remained vulnerable to corrosion, meaning relatively few have survived.

Official factory support for the Metro is now non-existent due to the demise of MG Rover which has ended the supply of crucial and unique parts. However, an entire industry has built up to continue support of the A-Series engine given its ubiquity in the classic Mini and other post-war British cars whilst a cottage industry exists in maintaining and providing parts for the Hydragas suspension system.
