= Roewe 750 =

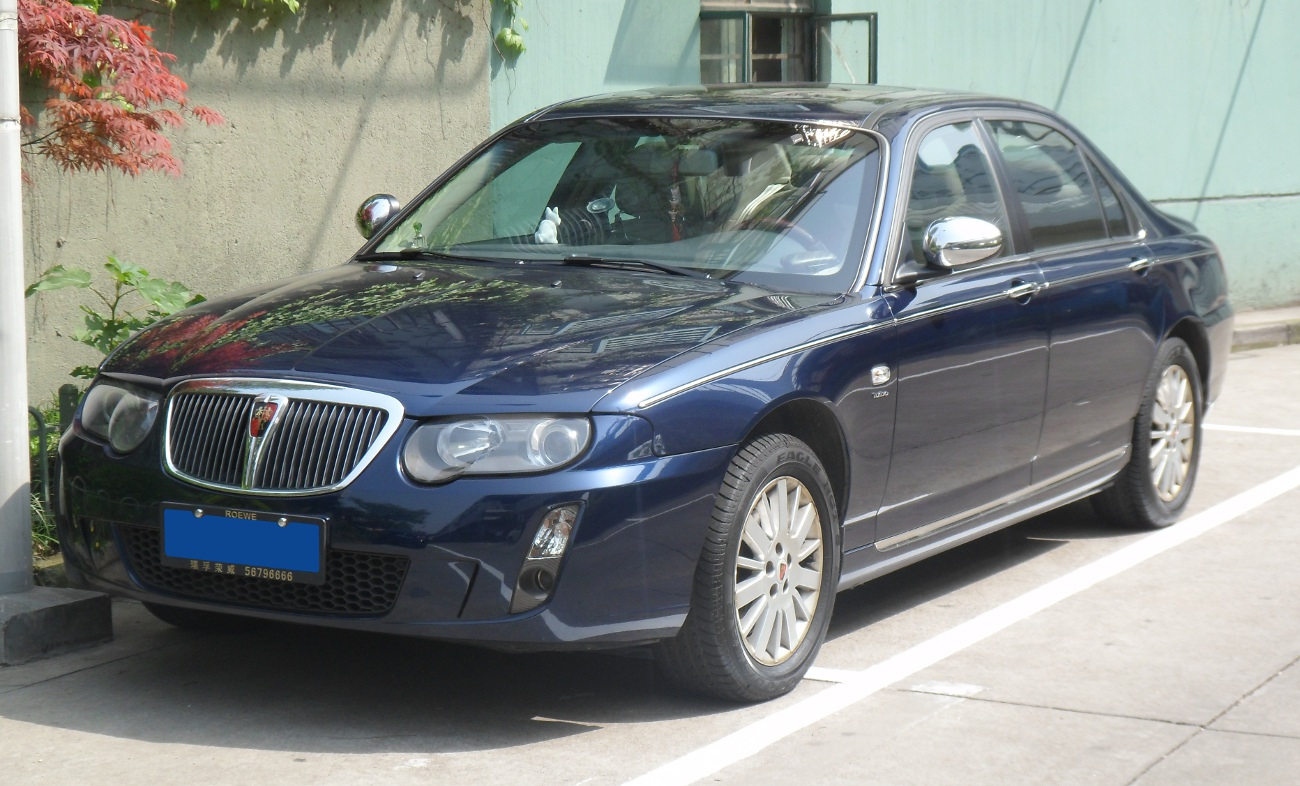

Overview
- Manufacturer: Roewe (SAIC Motor)
- Also called: MG 750 (export markets)
- Production: October 2006 – November 2016
- Assembly: China: Yangzhou, Yizheng

Body and chassis
- Class: Mid-size luxury / Executive car
- Body style: 4-door saloon
- Layout: FF layout
- Related: MG 7; MG ZT; Rover 75

Powertrain
- Engine: 1.8 L Kavachi I4 (turbo petrol); 1.8 L Kavachi I4 (turbo petrol Hybrid); 2.5 L KV6 V6 (petrol)
- Electric motor: BAS hybrid (750 MHEV); Permanent magnet motor (750 Hybrid)
- Transmission: 5-speed automatic
- Hybrid drivetrain: MHEV (750 MHEV); High-pressure hybrid engine technology (750 Hybrid)
- Battery: Johnson Controls Li-ion

Dimensions
- Wheelbase: 2,849 mm (112.2 in)
- Length: 4,865 mm (191.5 in)
- Width: 1,765 mm (69.5 in)
- Height: 1,422 mm (56.0 in)

Chronology
- Predecessor: Rover 75 (China)
- Successor: Roewe 950

The Roewe 750 is an executive saloon that was produced by Roewe in China between 2006 and 2016, based on the Rover 75.

== Overview ==
Launched in October 2006, and codenamed SAC528 during development, the wheelbase of the Roewe 750 is stretched by 103 mm (4.1 in) compared to the Rover 75. The drivetrain is a 2.5L V6 petrol engine (184bhp), based on the Rover KV6 engine and designated NV6, and the gearbox is a brand new five speed automatic. Unlike the 75 however, there are no wagon or performance versions available.

The company claims that 85% of the car is improved. Later, a 1.8T (turbo) petrol engine based on the Rover K-series engine, delivering around 160 bhp (119 kW; 162 PS) was introduced. The standard 1.8T version Roewe 750 was priced at 180,000 yuan (US$29,000 or £14,500) in January 2008.

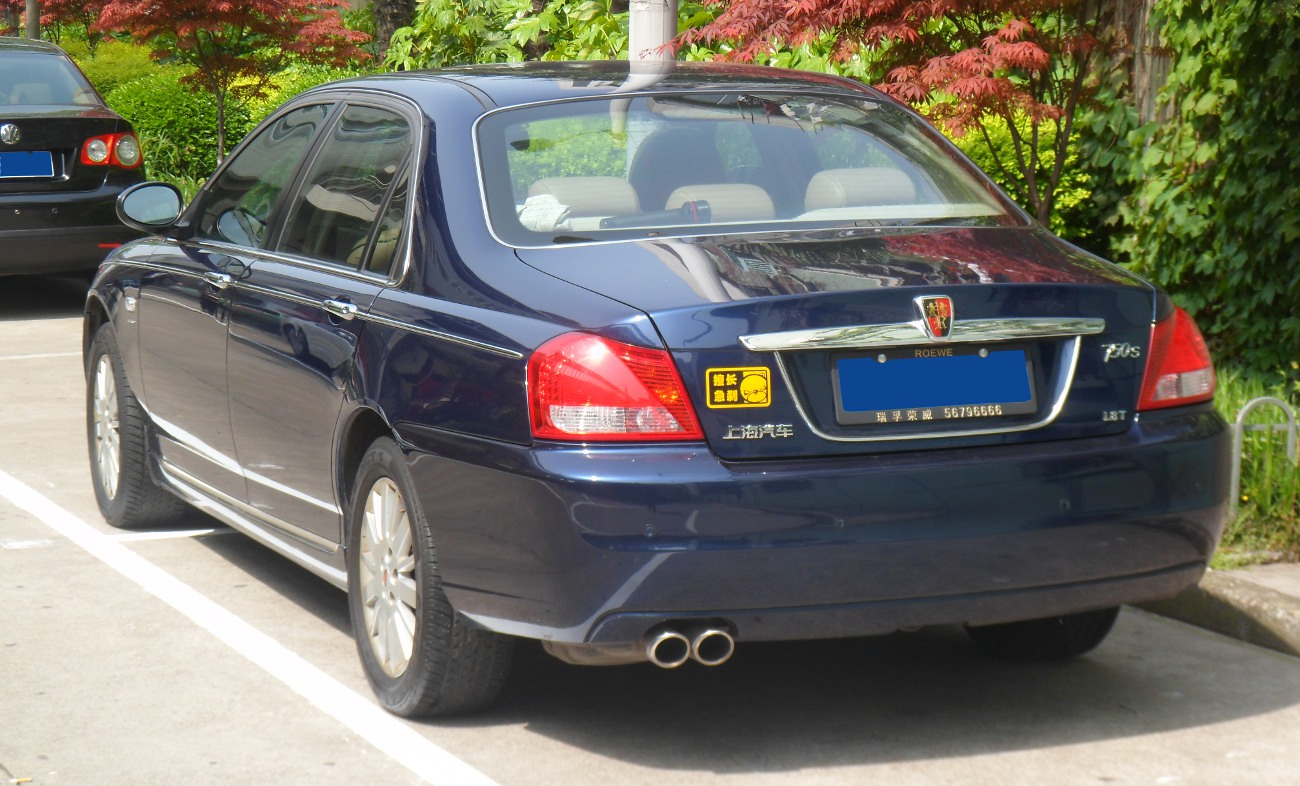
Roewe 750 1.8 Turbo (rear view)

The 750's three trim levels were 750D, 750E, and 750i. The 750D can include either engine and 16" wheels, while the 750E and 750i are V6 only and 18" wheels. The upper end 750i added GPS and television/DVD as standard features. Prices range from 181,800 Yuan for a L4 to 268,800 Yuan for a loaded 750i.

SAIC Roewe claim acceleration from still to 100 km/h (62 mph) in 9.5 seconds for the 1.8T Manual, 11.5 seconds for the 1.8T automatic and 10.2 seconds for the V6 automatic, fuel efficiency of 6.0 and 6.4L/100 km respectively, and top speeds of 205 km/h (127 mph) for the four and 220 km/h (137 mph) for the V6.

The Roewe 750 was exported to various foreign markets under the MG marque, such as Peru, Chile, Algeria and Egypt.

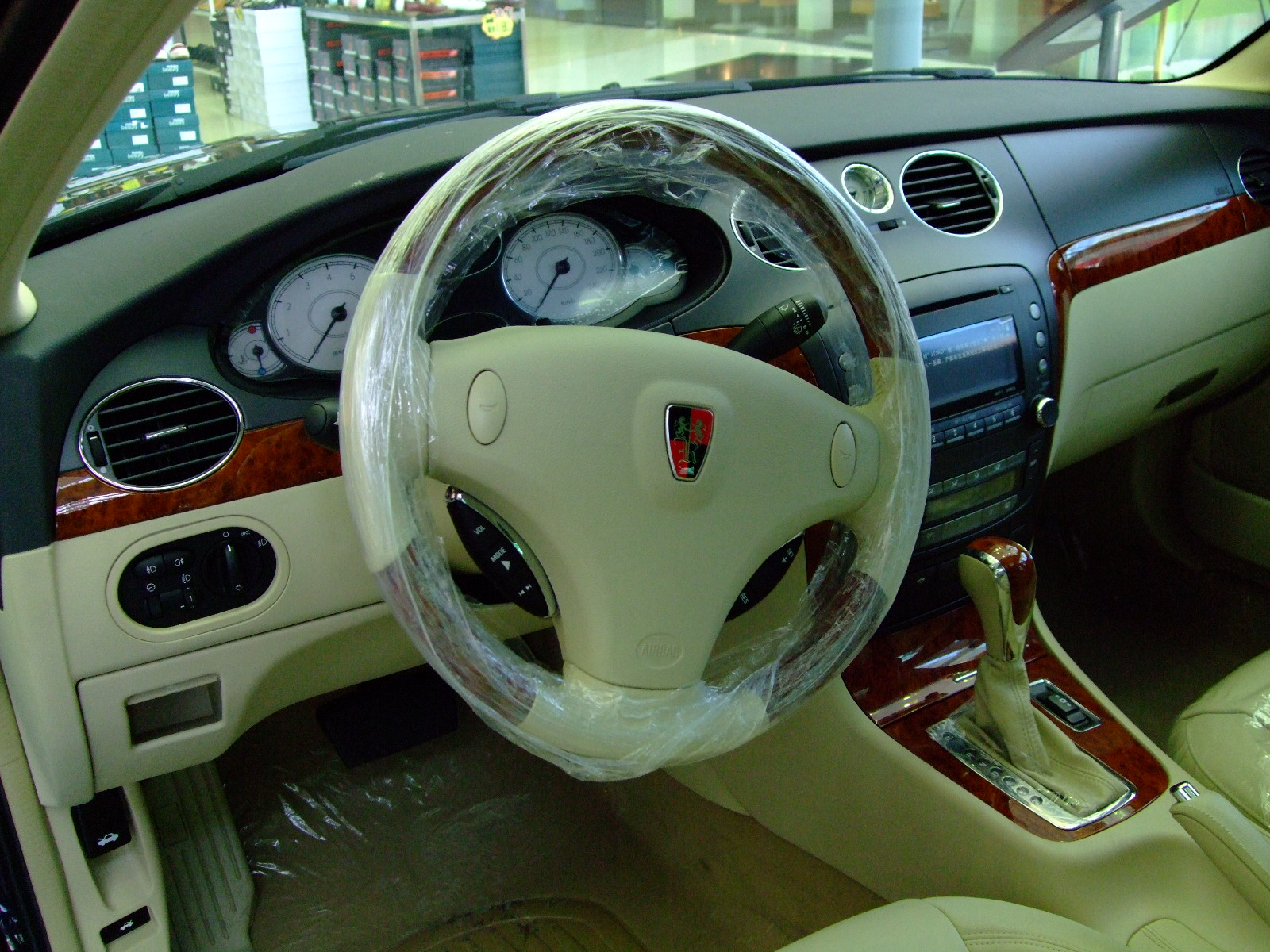
Roewe 750 interior
