= Rover KV6 engine =

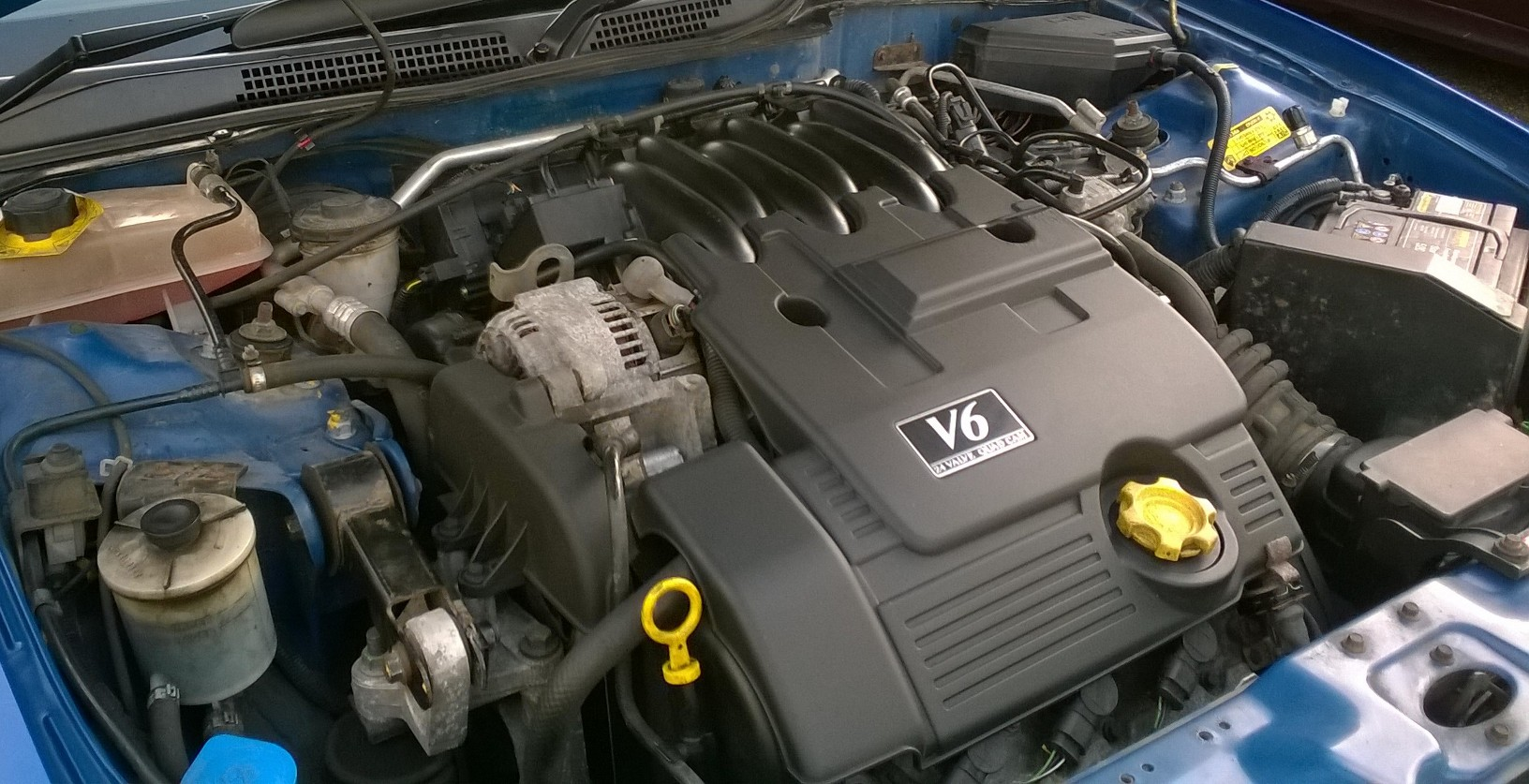

Overview
- Manufacturer: Rover Group; MG Rover Group
- Production: 1996–2005

Layout
- Configuration: Naturally aspirated V6
- Displacement: 2.0–2.5 L; 121.9–152.4 cu in (1,997–2,497 cc)
- Valvetrain: DOHC 4 valves x cyl.

Combustion
- Fuel system: Fuel injection
- Management: Rover MEMS or Siemens EMS200
- Fuel type: Petrol
- Cooling system: Water-cooled

Output
- Power output: 150–190 PS (110–140 kW; 148–187 hp)
- Torque output: 185–245 N⋅m (136–181 lb⋅ft)

The KV6 automotive petrol engine has a 24-valve quad-cam V6 configuration, and a pressurising variable-length intake manifold to add hot spots throughout the rev range. Variants exist in 2.0 to 2.5 litres (1,997 to 2,497 cc) capacities. These were built initially by Rover Group, then by Powertrain Ltd (a sister company to MG Rover). KIA manufactured KV6 in Korea under licence. Production moved from the UK to China in 2005, re-designated NV6.

== History ==
First introduced into the Rover 800 series with the 1996 facelift, including the flagship Sterling saloon and coupe models, it has since also powered the Rover 75 and its sister car, the MG ZT, as well as the Rover 45 and the MG ZS.

The engine was designed and developed by Rover at Longbridge to replace the Honda 2.7l V6 engine which was about to become non-compliant with tightening emissions legislation. The original unit was designed for low volume production but was later redesigned to fit into the smaller Rover 75's bonnet, although performance remained similar.

In 2004 the engine was licensed to Kia Motors who invested in a new plant at the Asan Bay complex to build the engine. This engine was used in several Kia vehicles. Its introduction in Korea shortly followed its use by Rover in the Sterling.

== Applications ==
- Gibbs Aquada, a high speed amphibious vehicle
- Kia Sedona (UK and North America, first generation)
- Kia Carnival (outside the UK and North America)
- Kia Credos
- Land Rover Freelander (first generation)
- MG ZS 180
- MG-ZT
- Naza Ria (Malaysia)
- Rover 825
- Rover 45
- Rover 75

The NV6 variant is deployed in Roewe 750 and MG 7 cars (China).

== Technology ==
The engine has fully automatically tensioned drive belts and adaptive Siemens EMS2000 engine management. The fuelling and ignition timing are constantly varied to match the load on the engine to improve refinement. The engine uses Variable Geometry Induction, whereby air induction pipe lengths vary to optimise engine torque in response to different engine and road speeds, aiding refinement and efficiency. Although it bears the name of K Series, the engine has almost no components in common with the 4-cylinder version.

In its Rover setup, the unit delivers peak engine power of 175 PS (129 kW; 173 hp) at 6,500 rpm, and maximum torque of 240 N⋅m (177 lb⋅ft) at 4000 rpm. The automatic gearbox in V6 800s is able to communicate with the engine, briefly easing torque to allow smoother changes.

Cam Drive

The engine is fitted with four overhead camshafts driven by synchronous tooth belts. The system was a joint development between Dayco (the belt supplier) and Rover.

A long serpentine belt at the front drives the coolant pump and both inlet cams. At the rear, each inlet cam drives its exhaust cam by a short link belt. The single front belt is tensioned by a spring-loaded tensioner pulley incorporating a hydraulic damping element, but the two link belts do not incorporate any tensioning device. Instead, belt tension is set at assembly by very careful control of belt length and each pulley pair is pre-tensioned.

An unusual feature of this system is that it incorporates "floating" inlet cam drive pulleys that are not directly keyed to the shafts. This means that special setting tools are required to establish the cam timing before the pulley fixings are tightened. This requirement is the result of the complexity of the cam drive train. In addition to the length and thickness tolerance of the belts, the accuracy of the cam timing is also affected by the positional and diameter tolerance of each pulley and the thickness of each major engine casting. The result is that the required degree of timing accuracy could not otherwise be maintained.

== Known issues ==
Early hand-finished units were affected by inconsistent production tolerances (1996–1998). This caused the height of the cylinder liners to vary, which risked over-compression or under-compression of the head gaskets. The engine was re-engineered and the production facility automated prior to launching the Rover 75 (1998–2005), the engine having to fit under the sloping Rover 75 bonnet. Those changes resolved head gasket issues and the KV6 has a positive reputation for reliability. Most of the reliability issues relate to "value engineered" bolt on ancillaries, but the base engine is capable of large mileages before rebuild is required.

The 1998 redesign of the KV6 by Rover Group under BMW included replacing the original metal inlet-manifolds and butterfly valves, with plastic units manufactured in Germany. The redesign also involved replacing the metal thermostat housing with a plastic unit. A costly but uncommon side-effect to using plastic components are breakages in the VIS (Variable Inlet System) butterfly valves that are mounted inside the non-serviceable inlet manifold. The second common fault is failure of the thermostat housing (often failing along the mould line), that will lead to gradual but rarely complete loss of coolant. A third common fault is oil contamination in the VIS motors that are mounted on the sides of the inlet manifold and control air intake. Damage to the butterfly valves or VIS motors is limited to causing a rattling noise in the manifold or minor loss of power at certain engine conditions.

A Kia manufactured variant of the engine was also fitted to the Kia Carnival (people mover) with some problems on early model engines. A large percentage of first generation (1999–2005) Kia Carnivals sold in Australia required a new engine— some multiple engines. In most cases KIA provided a reconditioned short (without transmission) engine free of charge and with no questions asked, providing the vehicle was under warranty. For those outside warranty, Kia "covered costs proportional to what should have been the full expected life of components" and charged for labour and consumables.
