= BMW M47 =

BMW M47 engine
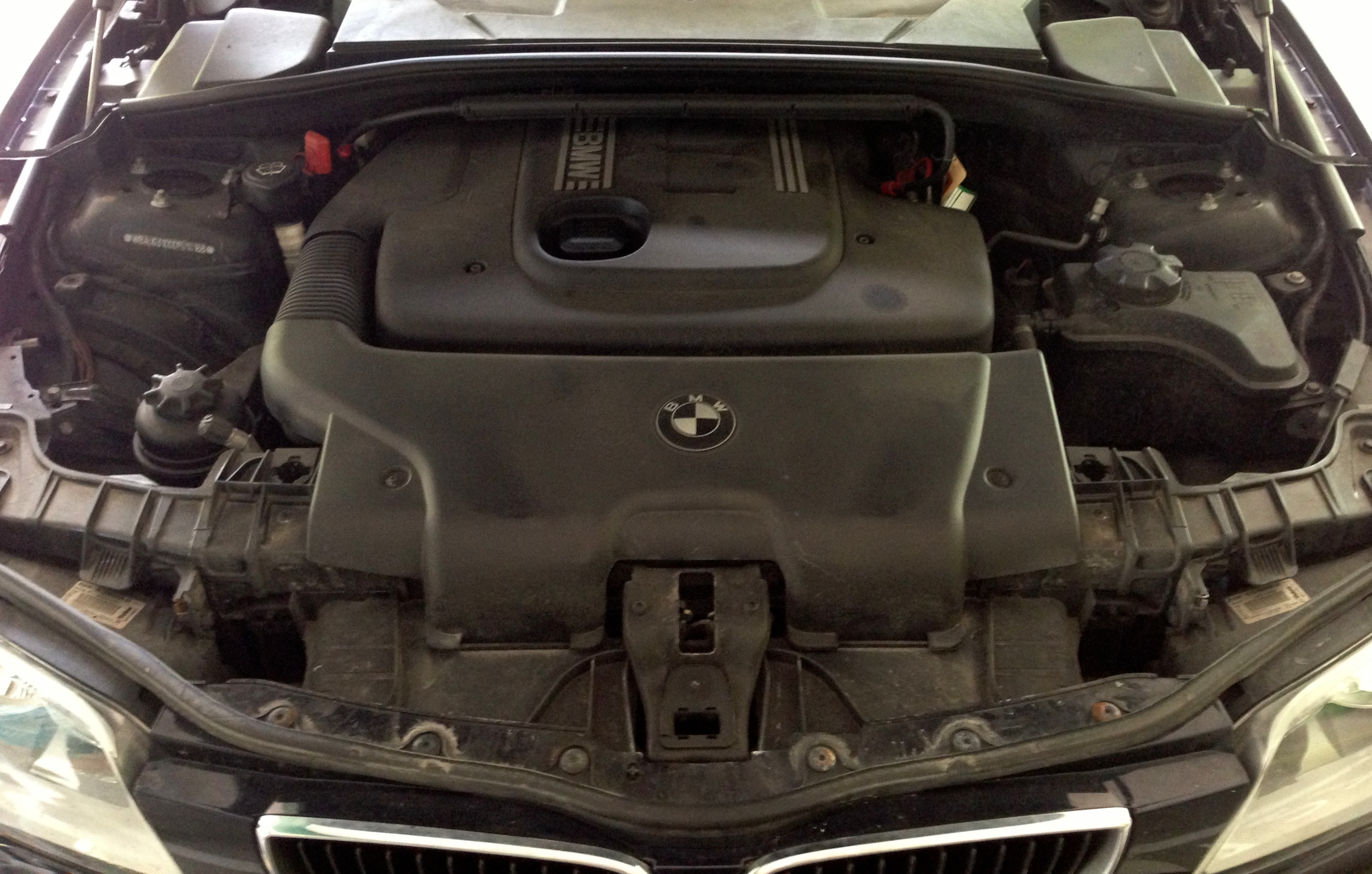
- BMW M47 in a E87 1 Series

Overview
- Manufacturer: BMW
- Production: 1999–2007

Layout
- Configuration: Straight-4
- Displacement: 2.0 L; 119.1 cu in (1,951 cc); 2.0 L; 121.7 cu in (1,994 cc)
- Cylinder bore: 84 mm (3.31 in)
- Piston stroke: 88 mm (3.46 in); 90 mm (3.54 in)

RPM range
- Max. engine speed: 4750

Combustion
- Turbocharger: Yes
- Fuel system: direct injection Common rail direct injection (M47R, M47TÜ & M47TÜ2)
- Fuel type: Diesel fuel (DIN EN 590)
- Cooling system: Water-cooled

Output
- Power output: 85–120 kW (116–163 PS; 114–161 hp)
- Torque output: 265–340 N⋅m (195–251 lb⋅ft)

Chronology
- Predecessor: BMW M41
- Successor: BMW N47; Rover G-Series (Rover); PSA DW12 (Land Rover)

The BMW M47 and Rover Group M47R are straight-4 Diesel engines. Variants were manufactured by BMW from 1998 to 2007. BMW gradually adopted high-pressure common rail fuel injection systems over the lifetime of the M47.

== Models ==
Engine	Displacement	Power at rpm	Torque at rpm	Redline	Year
M47D20	2.0 L (1,951 cc; 119.1 cu in)	85 kW (116 PS; 114 hp) at 4,000	265 N⋅m (195 lb⋅ft) at 1,750	4750	2001
M47D20	2.0 L (1,951 cc; 119.1 cu in)	100 kW (136 PS; 134 hp) at 4,000	280 N⋅m (207 lb⋅ft) at 1,750	4750	1998
M47R	2.0 L (1,951 cc; 119.1 cu in)	85 kW (116 PS; 114 hp) at 4,000	265 N⋅m (195 lb⋅ft) at 1,750	4750	1998
M47R	2.0 L (1,951 cc; 119.1 cu in)	100 kW (136 PS; 134 hp) at 4,000	280 N⋅m (207 lb⋅ft) at 1,750	4750	1999
M47D20TÜ	2.0 L (1,995 cc; 121.7 cu in)	85 kW (116 PS; 114 hp) at 4,000	280 N⋅m (207 lb⋅ft) at 1,750	4750	2001
M47D20TÜ	2.0 L (1,995 cc; 121.7 cu in)	110 kW (150 PS; 148 hp) at 4,000	330 N⋅m (243 lb⋅ft) at 2,000–2,500	4750	2002
M47D20TÜ2	2.0 L (1,995 cc; 121.7 cu in)	90 kW (122 PS; 121 hp) at 4,000	280 N⋅m (207 lb⋅ft) at 2,000	4750	2004
M47D20TÜ2	2.0 L (1,995 cc; 121.7 cu in)	120 kW (163 PS; 161 hp) at 4,000	340 N⋅m (251 lb⋅ft) at 2,000–2,750	4750	2004

== M47D20 ==
The original M47 diesel engine featured non-common-rail direct fuel injection and a 2.0 L (1,951 cc; 119.1 cu in) block. First seen in 1998, the M47D20 produced 100 kW (136 PS; 134 hp) and 280 N⋅m (207 lb⋅ft) in its original 320d/520d guise, and 85 kW (116 PS; 114 hp) with 265 N⋅m (195 lb⋅ft) in the 318d variant. All M47 engines have one Swirl and one Tangential intake port per cylinder, which can each improve performance under different conditions. These features are not to be confused with swirl flaps, which were introduced in the M47D20TÜ.

Applications:

- 85 kW (114 hp) and 265 N⋅m (195 lb⋅ft)
  - 2001–2003 E46 318d
- 100 kW (134 hp) and 280 N⋅m (207 lb⋅ft)
  - 1999–2001 E46 320d
  - 2000–2003 E39 520d

== M47R ==
Rover Group (UK) and Steyr (Austria), worked together to modify the M47D20 to create a transverse configuration for use in the Rover 75 front wheel drive saloon, as well as their all-wheel-drive Land Rover Freelander. The same engine was later deployed by MG Rover in the Rover 75 Tourer and MG ZT. The M47R ("M47 Rail") differs from the original design by the introduction of common-rail technology, a transverse orientation, different turbochargers and more sophisticated systems for temperature management. However, the core 2.0 L (1,951 cc; 119.1 cu in) heads of the M47R and M47D20 are the same. Combining a common-rail system with a relatively small engine capacity created engine temperature problems. More hardware was added to help control temperatures which also helped to escalate weight, fuel consumption, and manufacturing costs. The BMW Steyr plant manufactured and supplied M47R engines. The original version used in the Rover 75 developed 85 kW (116 PS; 114 hp) at 4000 rpm and 260 N⋅m (192 lb⋅ft) at 2000 rpm. An intercooler was fitted onto models from 2002 so they were rebadged "cdti" - i for intercooler- after Rover's separation from BMW, increasing power output to 96 kW (131 PS; 129 hp) at 3500 rpm and 300 N⋅m (221 lb⋅ft) at 1900 rpm, and was badged CDTi rather than CDT.

The M47R in the Rover 75 and MG ZT used a Mitsubishi turbocharger with wastegate, whereas that fitted to the Freelander used a Garrett VNT.

Applications:

- 1999–2004 Rover 75 CDT
- 2002–2005 Rover 75 CDTi
- 2001–2006 Land Rover Freelander
- 2001–2004 MG ZT CDT
- 2002–2005 MG ZT CDTi

== M47D20TÜ ==
The all-wheel drive BMW X3 and rear-wheel drive BMW 320d models, built approximately between September 2001 and December 2004, were fitted with the M47TÜ ("M47 Technical Update"). The exact production week is not known and was probably later than Production Week 33 in 2001 (e.g. one cannot rely on a UK 51 plate registered BMW 320d to have the M47TÜ).

The engine capacity was expanded to 2.0 L (1,995 cc; 121.7 cu in), and it retained the common-rail injector system that had proven popular in the smaller M47R and larger M57 engines. These changes empowered BMW to increase torque and improve fuel consumption, especially at lower revs. However, these modifications added 50 kg (110 lb) to overall weight and emissions raised accordingly. In the UK, the new characteristics of the M47TÜ were sufficient to lift the BMW 320d into the next highest insurance bracket, and the next highest band for Vehicle Excise Duty (Road Tax).

The M47TÜ was refined enough that BMW made it available in the 320Cd Coupé.

The M47D20TÜ introduced new common failure points. Chief among these was a new 'swirl flap' mechanism embedded in the inlet manifold. This consisted of a number of butterfly valves within each individual inlet tract, which are secured to an actuating rod via two small screws. It has become clear that over time these screws can come loose via vibration etc. When this happens they can end up being drawn into the respective cylinder, causing significant damage to the piston, cylinder head, and valves. If unlucky further damage can be caused to the turbo if the screw then makes its way through the exhaust valve into the manifold and subsequently into the turbo. These failures have occurred in such quantity that a number of specialist BMW magazines have featured articles on the problem including information on how to remove the swirl flaps. For those who wish to perform some preventive maintenance on the M47TUD20 engine, there are companies who supply and/or fit blanking plugs to allow the removal of these swirl flaps altogether. BMW addressed the problem by introducing stronger swirl flaps and larger diameter spindles – made from plastic – in 2006.

Applications:

- 85 kW (116 PS; 114 hp) and 280 N⋅m (207 lb⋅ft)
  - 2003–2005 E46 318d
- 110 kW (150 PS; 148 hp) and 330 N⋅m (243 lb⋅ft)
  - 2001–2005 E46 320d
  - 2001–2005 E46 320td (Compact)
  - 2004–2006 E90 320d
  - E83 X3 2.0d (up to end of 2006)

== M47D20TÜ2 ==
The engine was updated again in 2004 as the M47D20TÜ2 (for Technische Überarbeitung 2 = second revision). Still at 2.0 L (1,995 cc; 121.7 cu in), it produced more power across the range.

Applications:

- 90 kW (122 PS; 121 hp) and 280 N⋅m (207 lb⋅ft)
  - E87 118d
  - E90/E91 318d
- 120 kW (163 PS; 161 hp) and 340 N⋅m (251 lb⋅ft)
  - E60/E61 520d
  - E87 120d
  - E90/E91 320d
  - E83 X3 2.0d (end of 2006 onward)

== See also ==
- List of BMW engines
