= MG7 =

Four-door large family car

MG 7
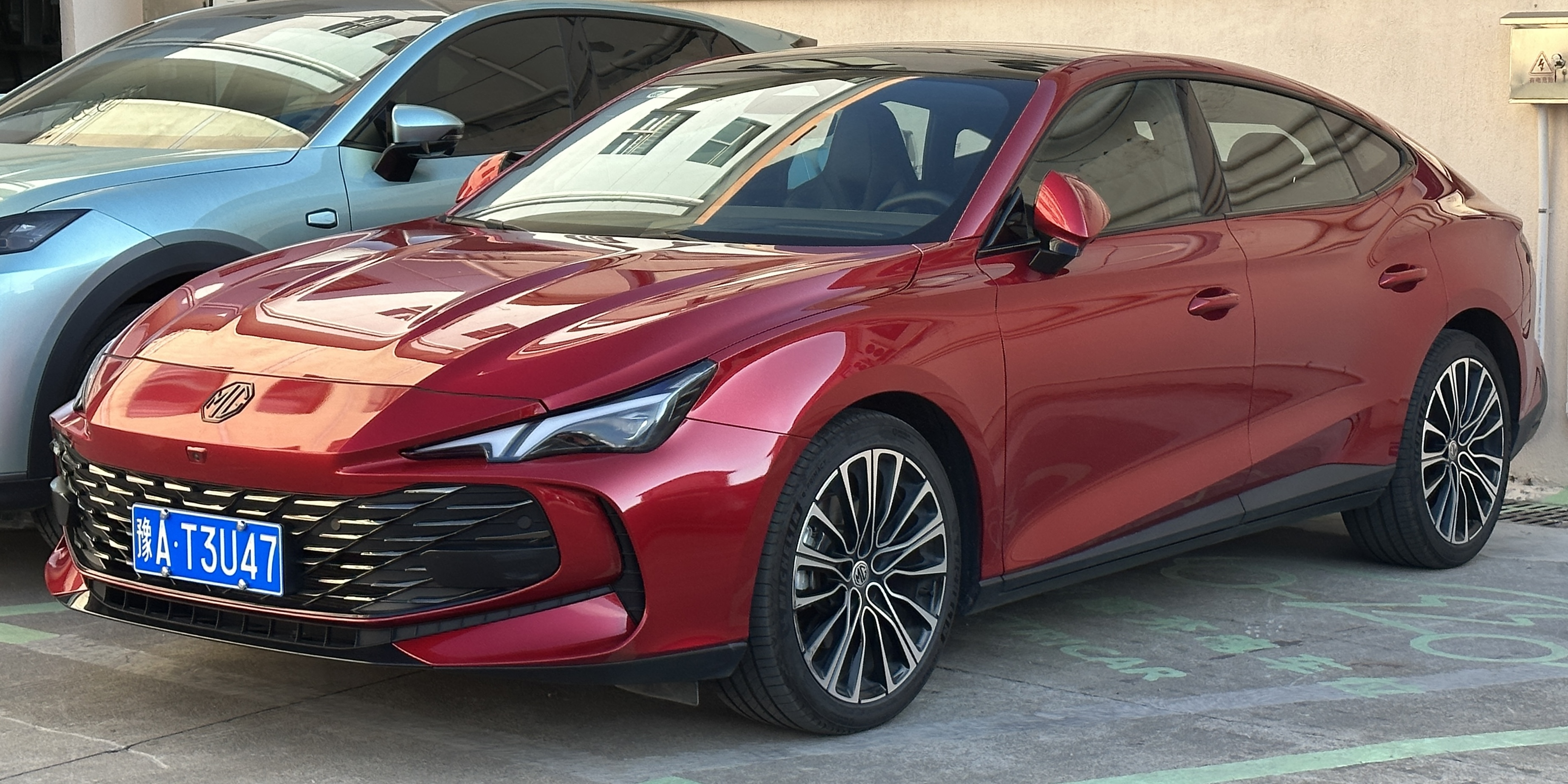

Overview
- Manufacturer: MG Motor
- Production: 2007–2013; 2022–present

Body and chassis
- Class: Large family car (D)
- Layout: Front-engine, front-wheel-drive

Chronology
- Predecessor: Rover 75; MG ZT

The MG7 is a large family car built by MG Motor in two generations, the first between 2007 and 2013 and the second from 2022 to present. The first generation is derived from its British predecessors, Rover 75 and MG ZT to suit Chinese manufacturing and sales

== First generation (2007) ==
First generation
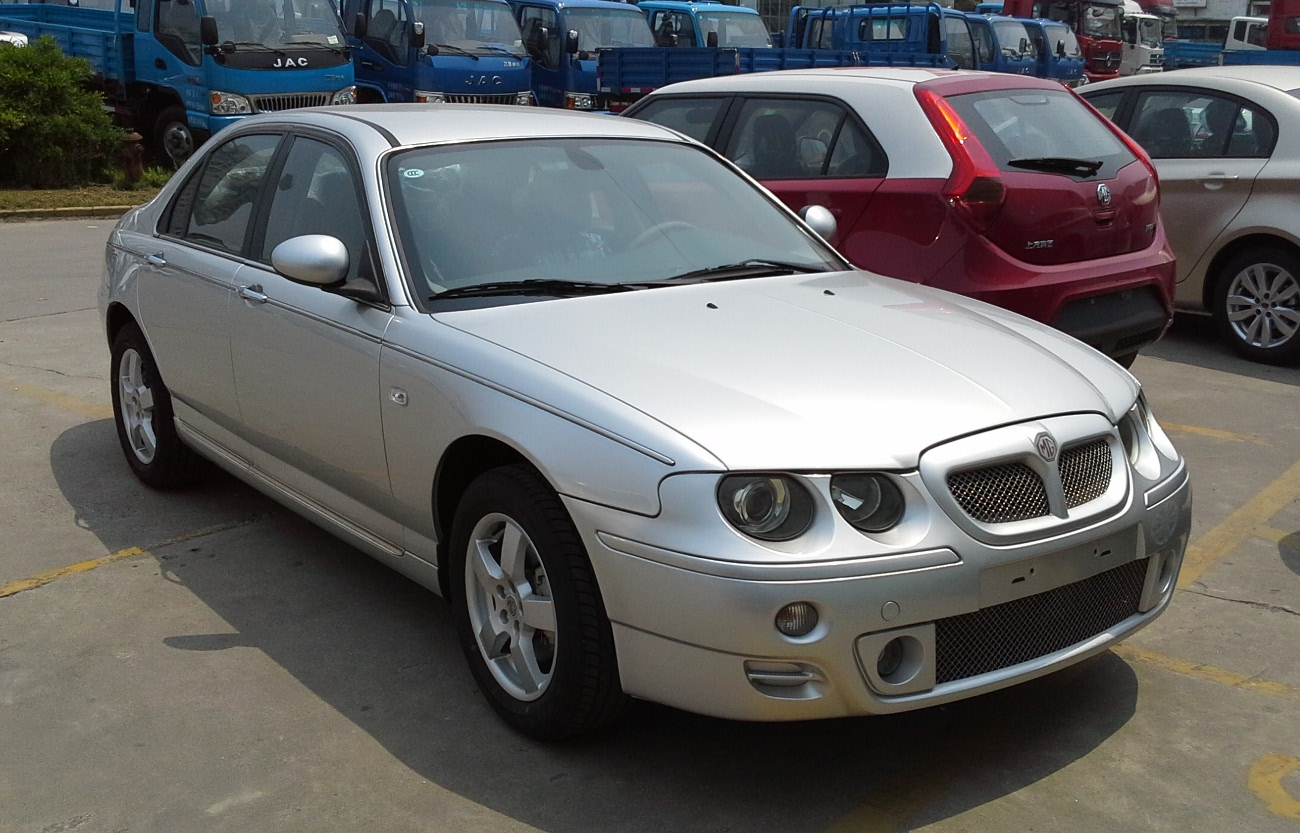

Overview
- Manufacturer: MG Motor (SAIC Motor, previously Nanjing Automobile)
- Production: 2007–2013
- Assembly: China: Pukou, Nanjing

Body and chassis
- Body style: 4-door saloon
- Related: MG ZT; Rover 75; Roewe 750

Powertrain
- Engine: 1.8 L N-series I4 turbo; 2.5 L NV6 V6
- Transmission: 5 speed manual/automatic

Dimensions
- Wheelbase: 2,749 mm (108.2 in)
- Length: 4,749 mm (187.0 in)
- Width: 1,761 mm (69.3 in)
- Height: 1,421 mm (55.9 in)
- Kerb weight: 1,500–1,645 kg (3,307–3,627 lb)

Production of the first-generation MG7 started in March 2007. The MG7 received praise from British car magazine Auto Express, who test drove it in May 2008, although it has not officially been sold in the United Kingdom.

The MG7 came in two variants, the first which resembles the Mark I MG ZT, with twin front lights, and the second which resembles the Mark II Rover 75 V8. A long wheelbase version, called the MG7L, features the deeper radiator grille of the Rover 75 V8.

It was offered in two trim levels: the 'Classic,' which featured a slatted grille, and the 'Sport,' which featured a mesh grille. Exterior styling closely resembled that of its predecessors, the MG ZT and Rover 75, with the most notable updates being newly designed LED rear light clusters and alloy wheels. Inside, the vehicle incorporated updated audio and heating systems, alongside a new sunroof design.

The MG7 came in two trim levels: 'Classic' which features a slatted grille, and 'Sport' with a mesh grille. The look of the 7 has changed very little from the ZT and 75; the only difference is freshly designed LED rear light clusters, and new alloy wheels. Also the car features new audio and heating systems, as well as a new sunroof system.

There were two engine options, the 1.8T and the 2.5 V6, both revised Rover K-Series engines called the N-Series, with stronger head gaskets, both meeting strict Euro IV emissions regulations. Changes to the electrical system have been made to improve the engine's ignition system and also to support the wider range of equipment, which includes front headrest mounted DVD players for rear passengers, and a reversing camera.

One of the greatest improvements is the replacement of some features, which were snatched away under Rover's Project Drive. These include bonnet insulation, driver's side grab handles and the noise, vibration, harshness package which reduces road, engine and wind noise in the cabin dramatically. All models now receive ITS head air bags.

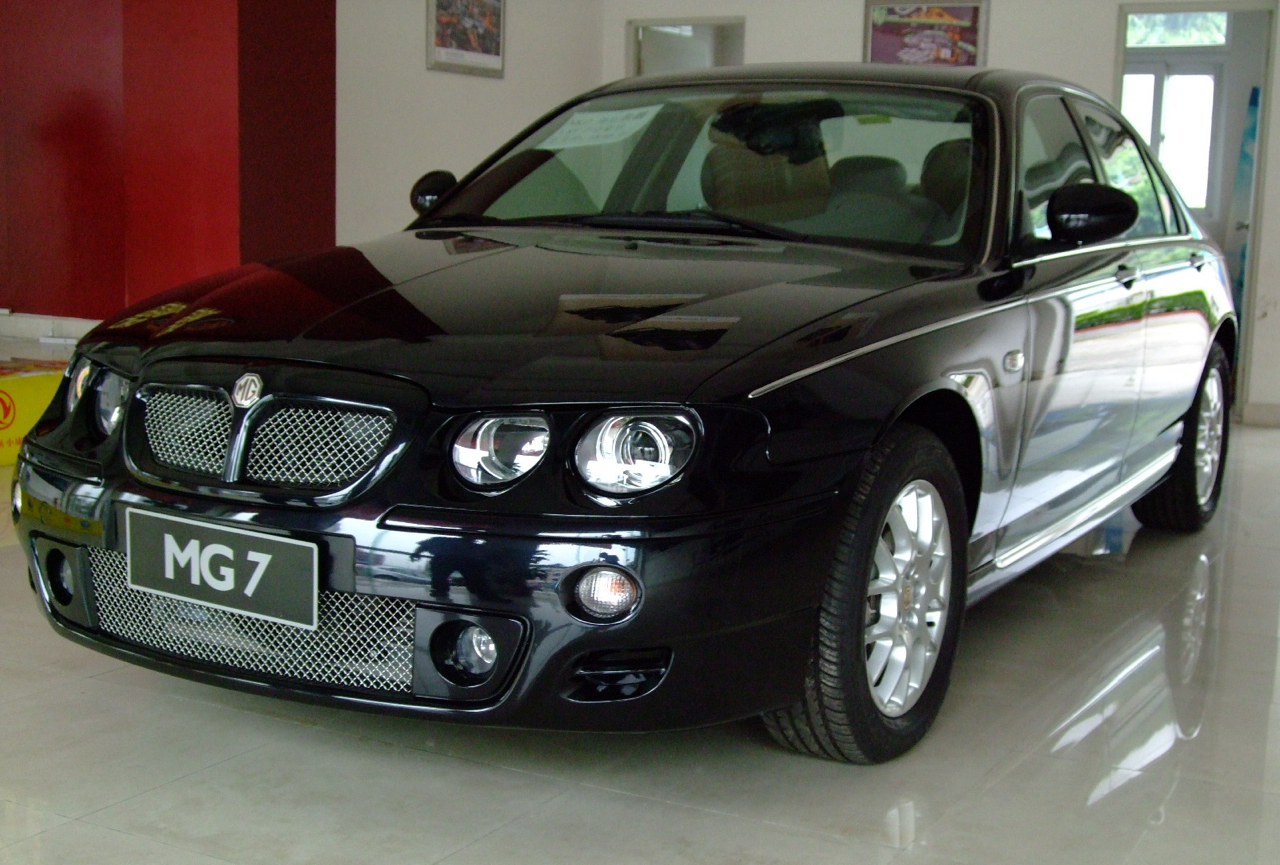
2008 MG7 front view

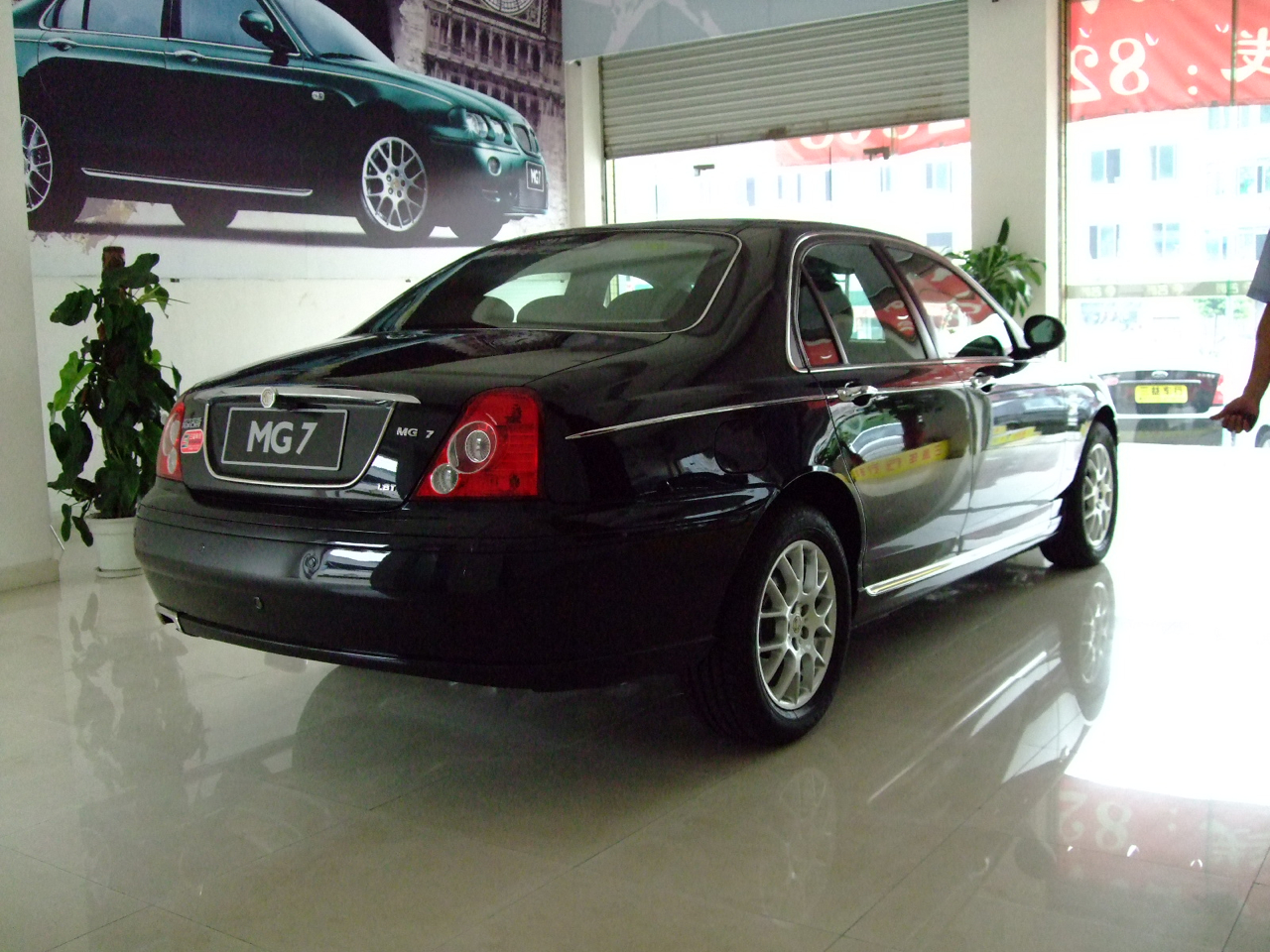
2008 MG7 rear view

== Second generation (2022) ==
Second generation
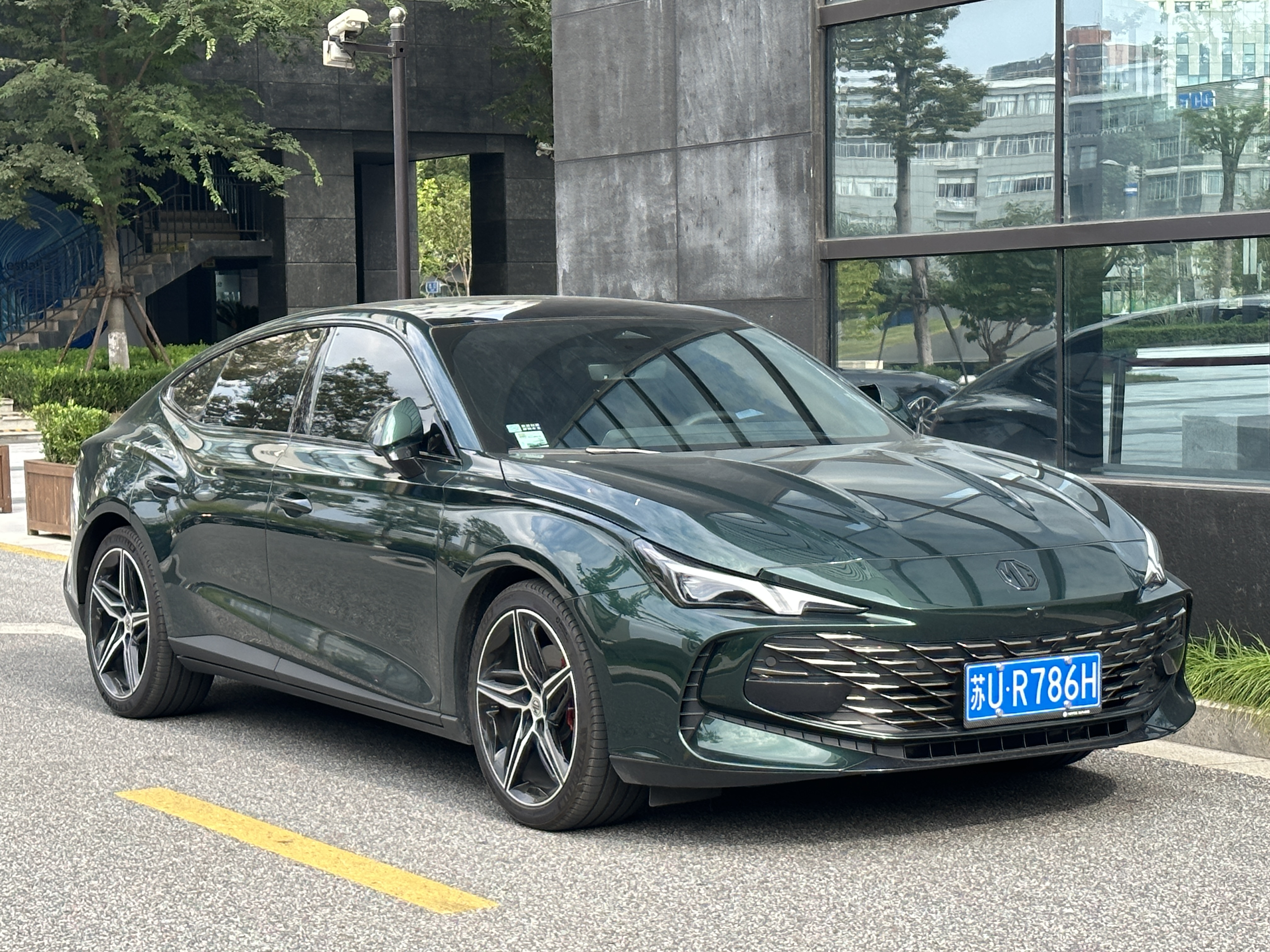

Overview
- Manufacturer: MG Motor (SAIC Motor)
- Model code: IP42
- Production: August 2022–present
- Assembly: China: Pukou, Nanjing

Body and chassis
- Body style: 4-door liftback saloon

Powertrain
- Engine: Petrol: 1.5 L 15FDE turbo I4; 2.0 L 20A4E turbo I4
- Power output: 138 kW (188 PS; 185 hp) (1.5 L); 192 kW (261 PS; 257 hp) (2.0 L)
- Transmission: 7-speed Sportronic DCT; 9-speed ZF 9HP automatic

Dimensions
- Wheelbase: 2,778 mm (109.4 in)
- Length: 4,884 mm (192.3 in)
- Width: 1,889 mm (74.4 in)
- Height: 1,447 mm (57.0 in)
- Kerb weight: 1,570–1,650 kg (3,461–3,638 lb)

The second generation MG7 was unveiled in August 2022 with a teaser campaign during July.

The MG7 is a fastback sports saloon and is expected to only be sold in China and make use of the new Black Label designation.

Two models are part of the launch: a 405 VTGI Trophy model with 2.0-litre petrol engine producing 192 kW (261 PS; 257 hp) and 405 N⋅m (299 lb⋅ft; 41 kg⋅m) of torque and equipped with a nine-speed ZF gearbox. The cheaper version is the 300 VTGI with a 1.5-litre petrol engine producing 138 kW (188 PS; 185 hp) and 300 N⋅m (221 lb⋅ft; 31 kg⋅m) of torque and a seven-speed dual-clutch automatic.

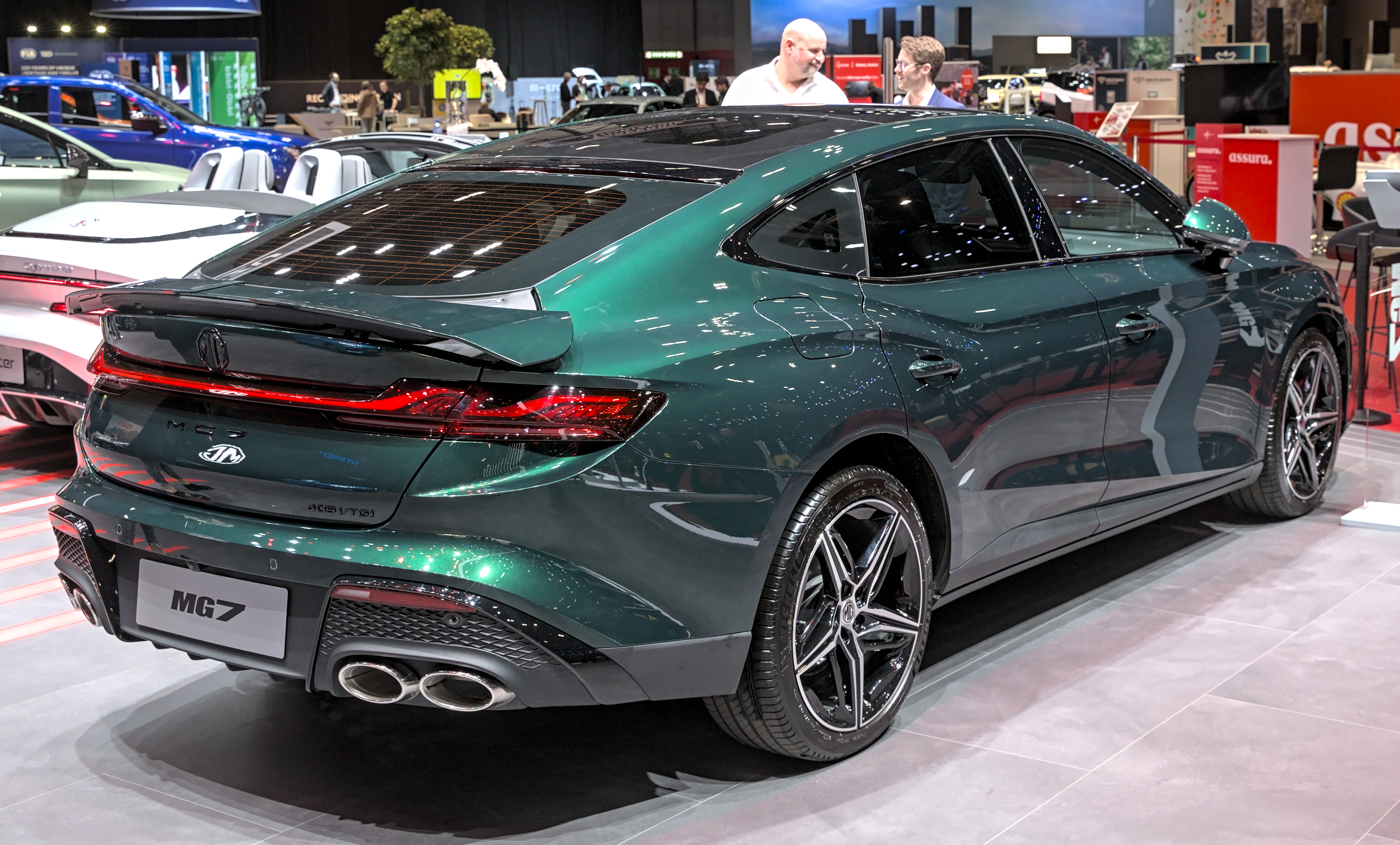
Rear view

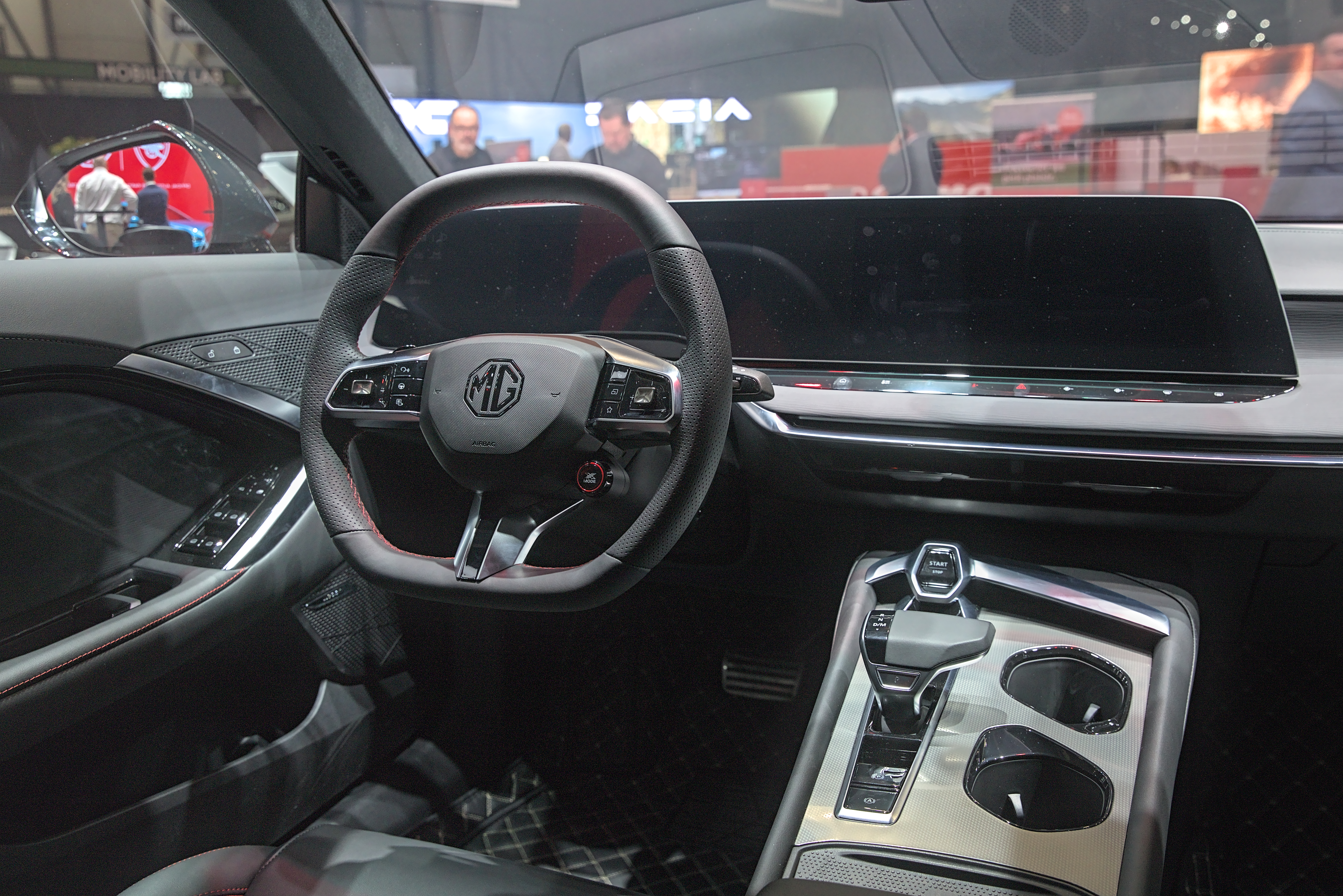
Interior

=== Markets ===
==== Australia ====
The MG7 was launched in Australia on 8 December 2025, in the sole unnamed variant powered by the 2.0-litre turbocharged petrol engine.

==== Mexico ====
The MG7 was launched in Mexico on 7 November 2024, alongside the MG RX9. It is available with two trim levels: Premier and Trophy, it is powered by the 2.0-litre turbocharged petrol engine.

==== Middle East ====
The MG7 was launched in the Middle East on 22 April 2024. It is powered by the 1.5-litre and 2.0-litre turbocharged petrol engines. It is offered in two trim levels; the 1.5L is offered are STD and DEL and the 2.0L is offered are COM and G.DEL.

==== Vietnam ====
The MG7 was launched in Vietnam on 28 August 2024, in two trim levels: Premium and Luxury, it is powered with 1.5-litre and 2.0-litre turbocharged petrol engines.

=== Powertrain ===
Specs
Model	Years	Transmission	Power@rpm	Torque@rpm	0–100 km/h (62 mph)	Top Speed
BlueCore 1.5T	2022–present	7-speed DCT	138 kW (188 PS; 185 hp) at 5,500–6,000 rpm	300 N⋅m (221 lb⋅ft; 31 kg⋅m) at 1,500–4,000 rpm		210 km/h (130 mph)
BlueCore 2.0T	2022–present	9-speed automatic	192 kW (261 PS; 257 hp) at 5,500–6,000 rpm	405 N⋅m (299 lb⋅ft; 41 kg⋅m) at 1,750–3,500 rpm	6.5 s	230 km/h (143 mph)

== Safety ==
ANCAP test results MG 7 all variants (2025, aligned with Euro NCAP)
Test	Points	%
Overall:	5 /5 stars	
Adult occupant:	35.41	88%
Child occupant:	41.96	85%
Pedestrian:	50.54	80%
Safety assist:	14.75	81%

== Sales ==
Year	China	Mexico
2023	27,637	—
2024	25,242	128
2025	14,693	361
