= Rover 75 =

Large British saloon car

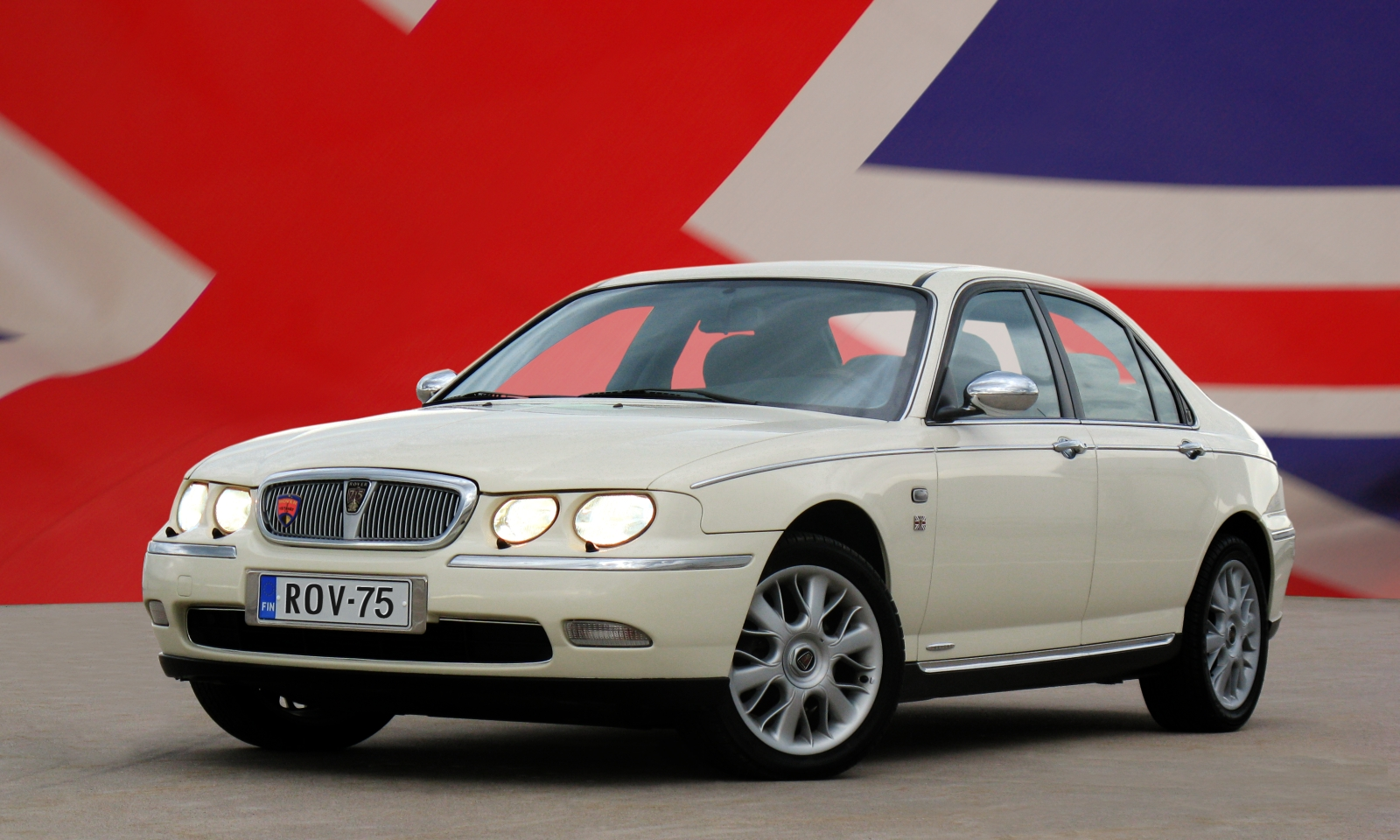
- Rover 75 Connoisseur SE

Overview
- Manufacturer: Rover Group (1998–2000); MG Rover (2000–2005)
- Also called: MG ZT; Brilliance B8 (China)
- Production: 1998–2005
- Assembly: United Kingdom: Cowley, Oxford (Plant Oxford: 1998–2000); United Kingdom: Longbridge, Birmingham (Longbridge plant: 2000–2005)
- Designer: Richard Woolley (saloon); Ian Callum (Tourer)

Body and chassis
- Class: Large family car
- Body style: 4-door saloon 5-door estate
- Layout: Transverse Front-engine, front-wheel-drive; Longitudinal Front-engine, rear-wheel-drive (Rover 75 V8)
- Platform: Rover R40
- Related: MG 7; MG ZT; Roewe 750; BMW 3 Series (E46)

Powertrain
- Engine: Petrol; 1.8 I4 18K4F; 1.8 T I4 18K4T; 2.0 V6 20K4N; 2.5 V6 25K4N; 4.6 V8 2L2E; Diesel; 2.0 I4 M47R
- Transmission: Manual; 5-speed; Automatic; 4-speed (V8); 5-speed JF506E (I4 & V6)

Dimensions
- Wheelbase: 2,746 mm (108.1 in) (saloon, estate); 2,946 mm (116.0 in) (limousine)
- Length: 4,747 mm (186.9 in) (saloon); 4,791 mm (188.6 in) (estate); 4,950 mm (194.9 in) (limousine)
- Width: 1,778 mm (70.0 in)
- Height: 1,424 mm (56.1 in)
- Kerb weight: 1,370–1,600 kg (3,020–3,530 lb)

Chronology
- Predecessor: Rover 600; Rover 800
- Successor: Roewe 750 (for Rover 75); MG7 (for MG)

The Rover 75 is a large family car or executive car which was manufactured from 1998 to 2005 by the British Rover marque. There are two body styles—a four-door saloon car and a five-door estate car. Initially built only with front-wheel drive, a rear-wheel-drive variant with a V8 engine was later sold. There was also an extended-wheelbase model. In 2001, MG Rover launched a badge engineered variant, the MG ZT. A coupé concept was built, but did not receive further development.

Rover 75s were manufactured by the Rover Group at Cowley, Oxfordshire, for one year. After owner BMW sold Rover, the 75 was manufactured by the new MG Rover Group at their Longbridge site in Birmingham. The Rover 75 debuted at the Birmingham Motor Show, with deliveries commencing in February 1999. As the last large Rover saloon, production of all models ended in 2005 when MG Rover Group entered receivership.

== History ==
The Rover 75 started life as part of a group of three new designs for the company under the guidance of Richard Woolley; a large saloon codenamed Flagship, a smaller vehicle (with the codename of Eric), and the 75. Of these only the 75 concept progressed. The initial aim was to reskin the Rover 600 (launched in April 1993) but following the BMW takeover in 1994, it was quickly decided that this platform would not be reused but replaced by an entirely new model, scheduled for launch in the late 1990s.

Work on the new model, codenamed R40, progressed with little operational interference from BMW; the styling received an enthusiastic response from the management and both companies believed the classical look would be the ideal direction for Rover. Advanced design processes included 3D virtual reality assembly simulations.

The Rover 75 debuted at the Birmingham Motor Show on 20 October 1998 and went on sale until 17 June 1999 having been extensively tested by the motoring press.

The 75 featured a range of petrol and diesel engines from 1.8- to 2.5-litre sizes. Petrol engines provided were Rover's four-cylinder K series in 1.8-litre guise and the quad cam KV6, offered in either short-stroke 2.0 or revised 2.5-litre formats. The 2.0-litre was later dropped on introduction of the 1.8-litre turbo for emissions purposes. A diesel engine was provided through BMW Group channels. Engineered by Rover Group and Steyr engineers for transverse mounting, the 4-cylinder M47R (M47 Rail) differed from M47D20 engines found in the E46 3 Series and E39 5 Series by featuring a direct injection common-rail system, different turbocharger and more sophisticated systems for temperature management.

Transmissions on all models were either the Getrag 283 5-speed manual, supplied from the company's new facility in Bari, Italy, or the JATCO 5-speed automatic unit — one of the first transverse engine deployments made with this feature.

Disc brakes at all four wheels were augmented by a Bosch 5.7 4-channel ABS system and electronic brake force distribution. The parking brake was a cable operated drum integral within the rear discs.

Suspension was via front MacPherson struts, anchored by alloy lower L-arms and widely spaced mounting points. The rear suspension was a version of BMW's Z-Axle arrangement used on the 1988 Z1 sports car.

The 75 won a series of international awards.

Assembly originally took place at Cowley but in 2000, following the sale of the company by BMW to Phoenix Venture Holdings, production was moved to Longbridge in Birmingham, England. 2001 saw the introduction of the Rover 75 Tourer (developed alongside the saloon but never authorised for production by BMW), swiftly followed by the MG ZT and MG ZT-T, more sporting interpretations of the model, differentiated by modified, sporting chassis settings and colour and trim derivatives. Between 2000 and 2003, there were few changes to the range: the most significant was the replacement of the 2-litre V6 engine by a low-pressure-turbocharged version of the 1.8-litre, four-cylinder engine. The introduction of the 'greener' 1.8-litre turbo greatly benefited British company car drivers who are taxed on carbon dioxide emissions. A customisation programme, Monogram, was launched, allowing buyers to order their car in a wider range of exterior paint colours and finishes, different interior trims and with optional extras installed during production. Rather surprisingly, the 75 was offered for sale in Mexico, making it the first Rover to be sold in the Americas since the Sterling.

From June 2002, a factory-approved dual-fuel petrol/liquid petroleum gas conversion was available in the UK on 1.8 and 2.5-litre models. The LPG conversion was an after-market undertaking approved by MG Rover. Developed by EcoGas Systems Ltd and Landi Renzo S.R.L. in conjunction with MG Rover Powertrain Limited, the conversion was ordered from Rover dealerships, the cars retaining the three-year factory warranty. The retail price of the conversion was £2,195, but in an effort to encourage LPG use for transport, for ecological reasons, the UK Government offered a Powershift Rebate of some 60% of the conversion cost. When running on LPG, the Rover 75 suffers only a slight reduction in performance compared to running on petrol; LPG fuel consumption is also slightly higher than when running on petrol but this is more than offset by the greatly reduced cost of the fuel.

=== Tourer ===
Rover released the Ian Callum designed station wagon/estate bodystyle of the 75, called Tourer, in July 2001. The tailgate featured an optional opening rear glass section. The load space was up to 1,480 mm wide and 2,060 mm long. With the seats up there is 400 to 680 litres of cargo space, and with the seats folded down (in a 60:40 ratio complete with centre load-through hatch) there is 1,222 litres available.

Vehicle	Saloon	Estate
Rover 75	432 L	400 L - 1,222 L
Alfa Romeo 156	378 L	360 L - 1,180 L
Audi A4 (B5)	440 L	390 L - 1,250 L
Jaguar X-Type	452 L	465 L - 1,415 L
Lexus IS (XE10)	400 L	343 L - 1,000 L
Mercedes-Benz C-Class (W202)	430 L	465 L - 1,510 L
SAAB 9-3 (2nd Gen.)	425 L	419 L - 1,273 L

Self-levelling rear suspension and an integral load restraint system were optional for the Tourer. Up to 100 kg can be loaded onto the roof, and the rear sill has a height of 544 mm. Four hinged chrome lashing eyes are fitted to the floor, and oddment stowage compartments and two recessed hooks are located in the side walls.

=== Long Wheelbase ===
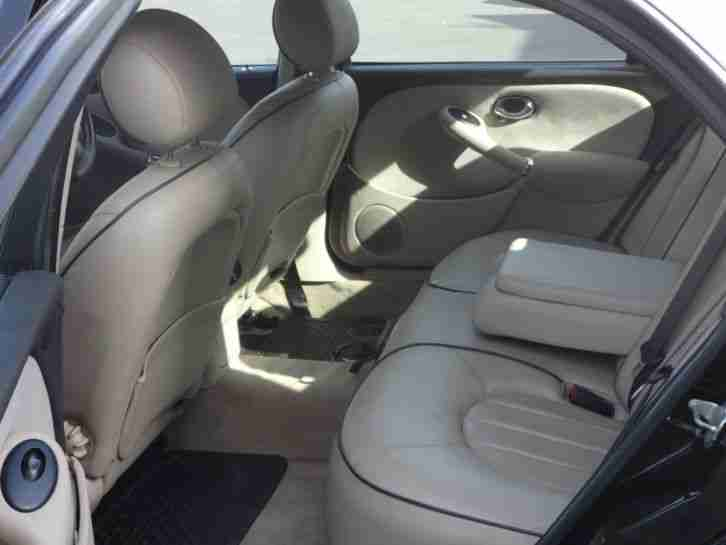
Rover 75 Vanden Plas

A stretched version of the Rover 75—initially called Vanden Plas (later simply Limousine) was introduced in 2002. Developed in conjunction with vehicle builder S. MacNeillie & Son Limited in Walsall, England, the model was stretched by 200 mm in the rear floor pan and altering the rear doors. Available only in Connoisseur specification, its production moved to Longbridge after an initial short run by MacNeillie. The 75 was a ministerial car in the British Government, Tony Blair having official use of one while he was Prime Minister. Alistair Darling was seen in a long wheelbase Rover 75.

=== Rover 75 V8 ===
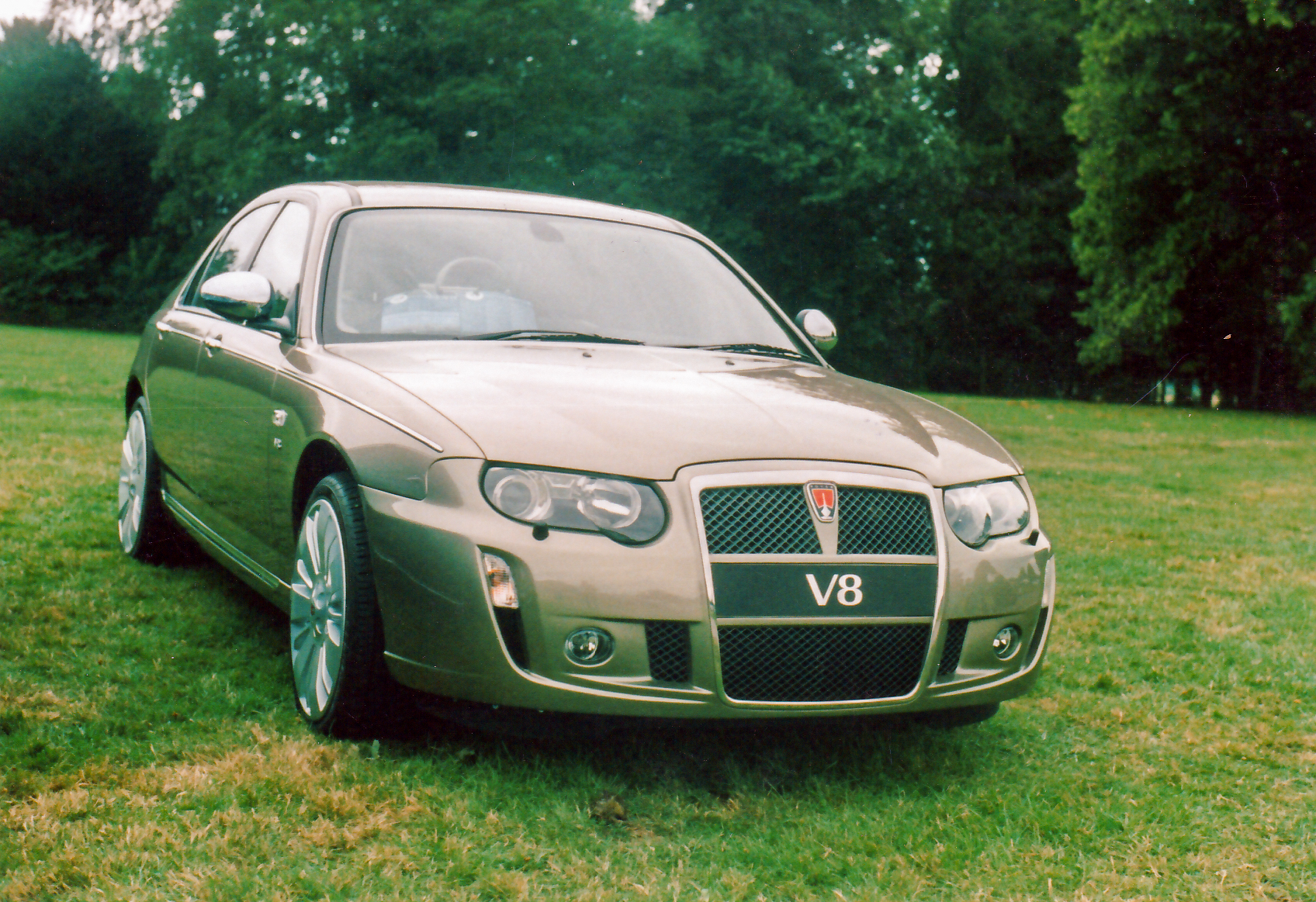
Rover 75 V8

Rover announced a V8 model at the 2004 Geneva Motor Show. This was the second iteration of the rear-wheel-drive platform developed from the front-wheel-drive Rover 75 platform by MG Rover, following the MG ZT 260, introduced in 2003. It was the first V8-engined Rover since the demise of the Rover SD1 in 1986. The platform was extensively re-engineered for the 4.6 litre version of the Ford Modular engine and rear-wheel-drive, including a stiffened tunnel and bespoke rear suspension.

As with the ZT 260, the 75 V8 was built on the standard production line, removed to allow the necessary structural modifications and installation of the V8 drivetrain, then returned to the line for final trim. Instead of the MG ZT 260's Tremec TR-3650 manual gearbox, the Rover 75 V8 featured Ford's 4R75W 4-speed automatic transmission. Other features included non-standard heating and ventilation, revised brakes and suspension, quad exhaust pipes, special badging, and a "premium" front bumper featuring a deeper grille. 166 were produced in both saloon and tourer body styles, compared with 717 MG ZT 260s, for a total of 883 V8 cars.

A heavily modified MG ZT-T V8, known as the X-15 broke the speed record for a non-production estate car on Bonneville Salt Flats, Utah, U.S., in September 2003, achieving 225.609 mph (363.082 km/h). The engine was bored out to 6 litres, producing 765 bhp (570 kW; 776 PS), but remained normally aspirated.

=== Facelift ===
==== Exterior ====
In the northern hemisphere spring of 2004, Rover introduced a facelifted 75 featuring an entirely new front grille and bumper, with one-piece headlights with halogen projectors. The rear also featured a new bumper with a revised chrome boot handle. The "premium" grille usually reserved for V8 and long-wheelbase models, was also applied to the limited edition CDTi Sport model in Portugal. This version, with blacked-out trim and 17-inch alloy wheels, was otherwise in Connoisseur SE spec, celebrating Rover's centenary in Portugal.

==== Interior ====
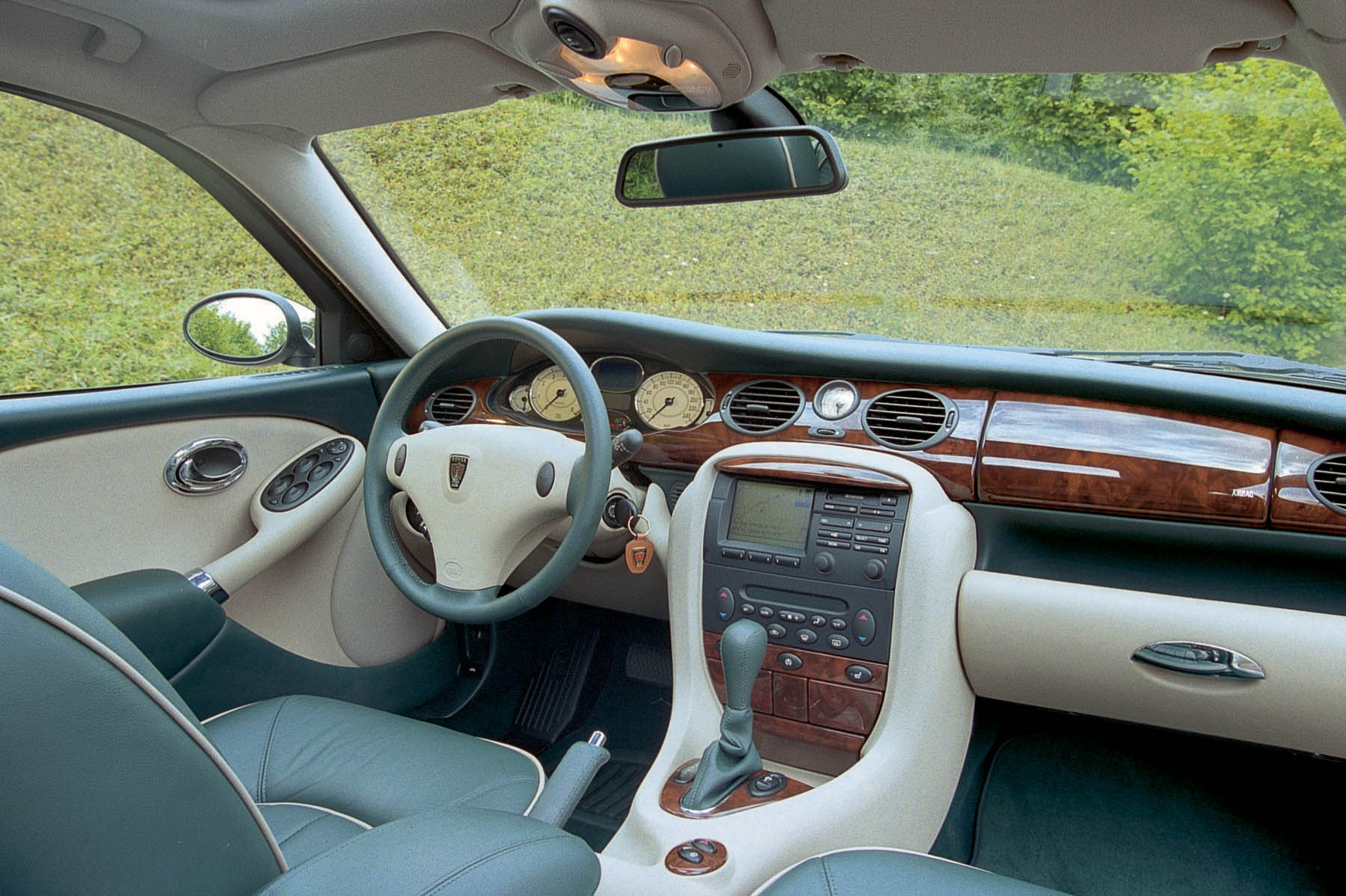
Dashboard pre-facelift

Classic SE, Club and Club SE trim levels were dropped, and on Connoisseur trim light oak wood took the place of the original walnut, which remained standard fitment on the entry-level Classic trim. Rover also added a new trim to the range called Contemporary which featured revised fittings such as larger alloy wheels, body colour exterior accents, black oak wood trim and sports seats as well as an altered equipment. The instrumentation and its back-lighting were revised, the console texture finish was revised and the seat bolsters revised. Access to the rear seats was improved and leg-room increased.

==== Technical ====
Steering received revised ratios from the MG ZT. Suspension was reworked.

=== Gallery ===
Pre-facelift styling

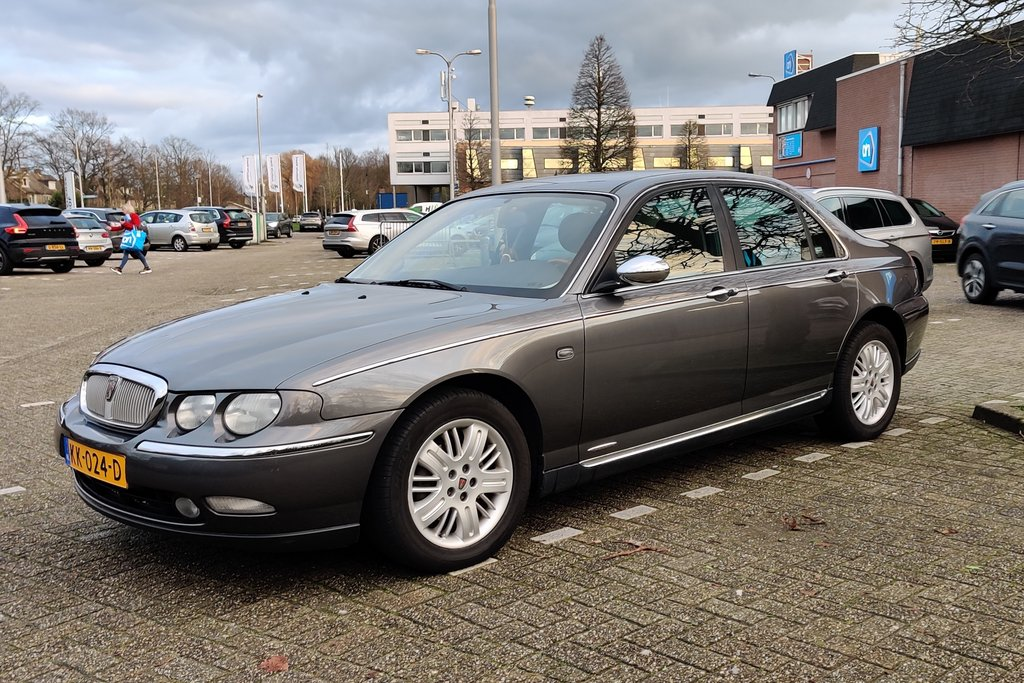
Pre-facelift early Cowley build Rover 75 Saloon

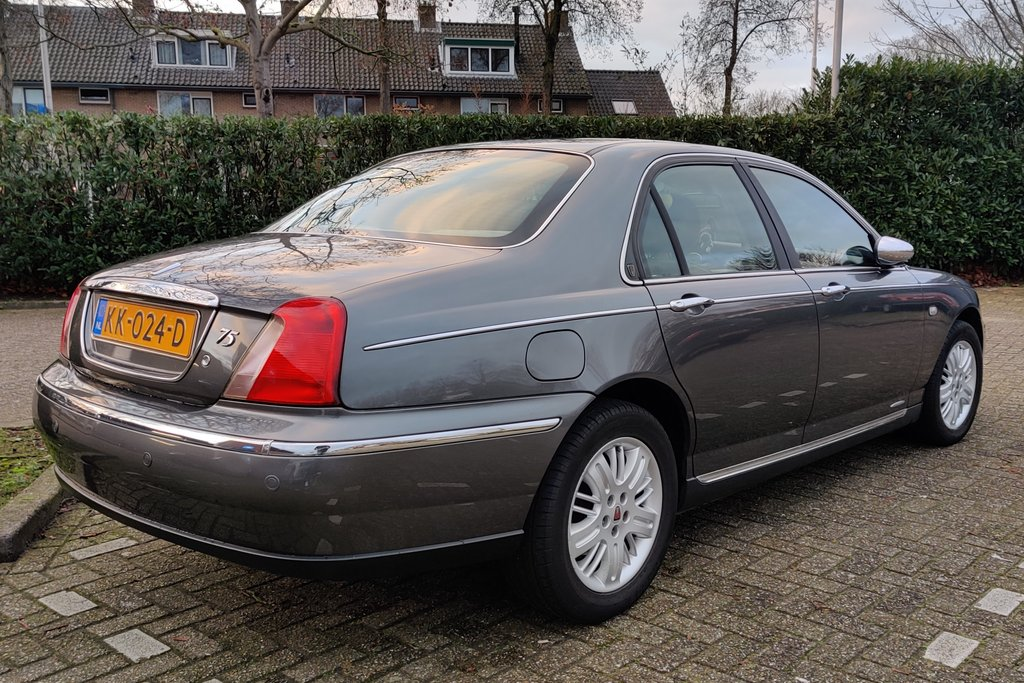
Pre-facelift early Cowley build Rover 75 Saloon rear

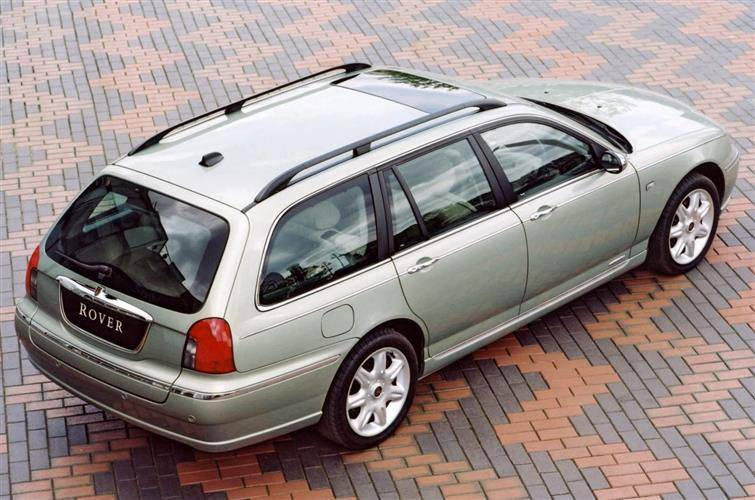
Pre-facelift Rover 75 Tourer / estate

Post-facelift styling

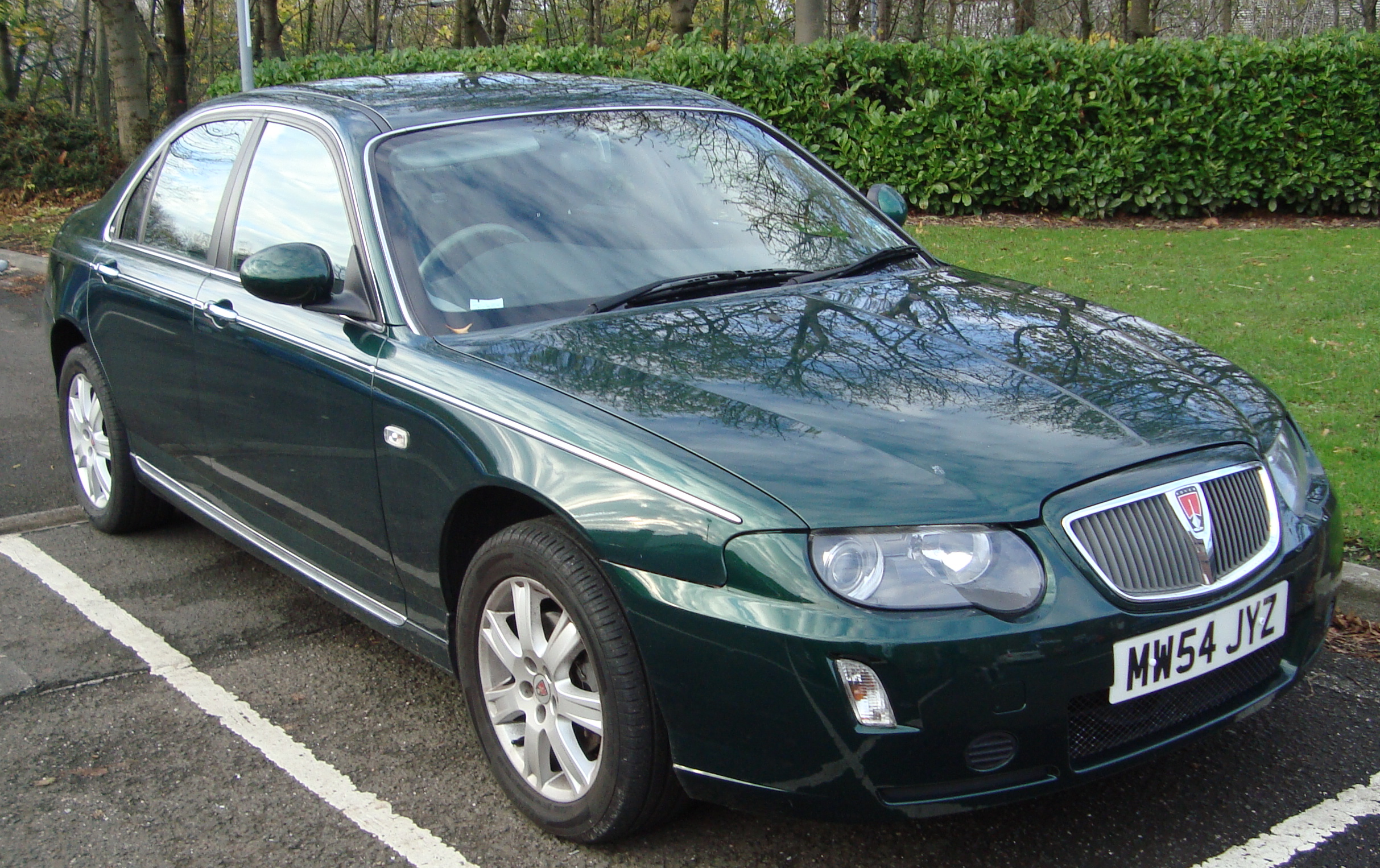
Facelift Rover 75 saloon

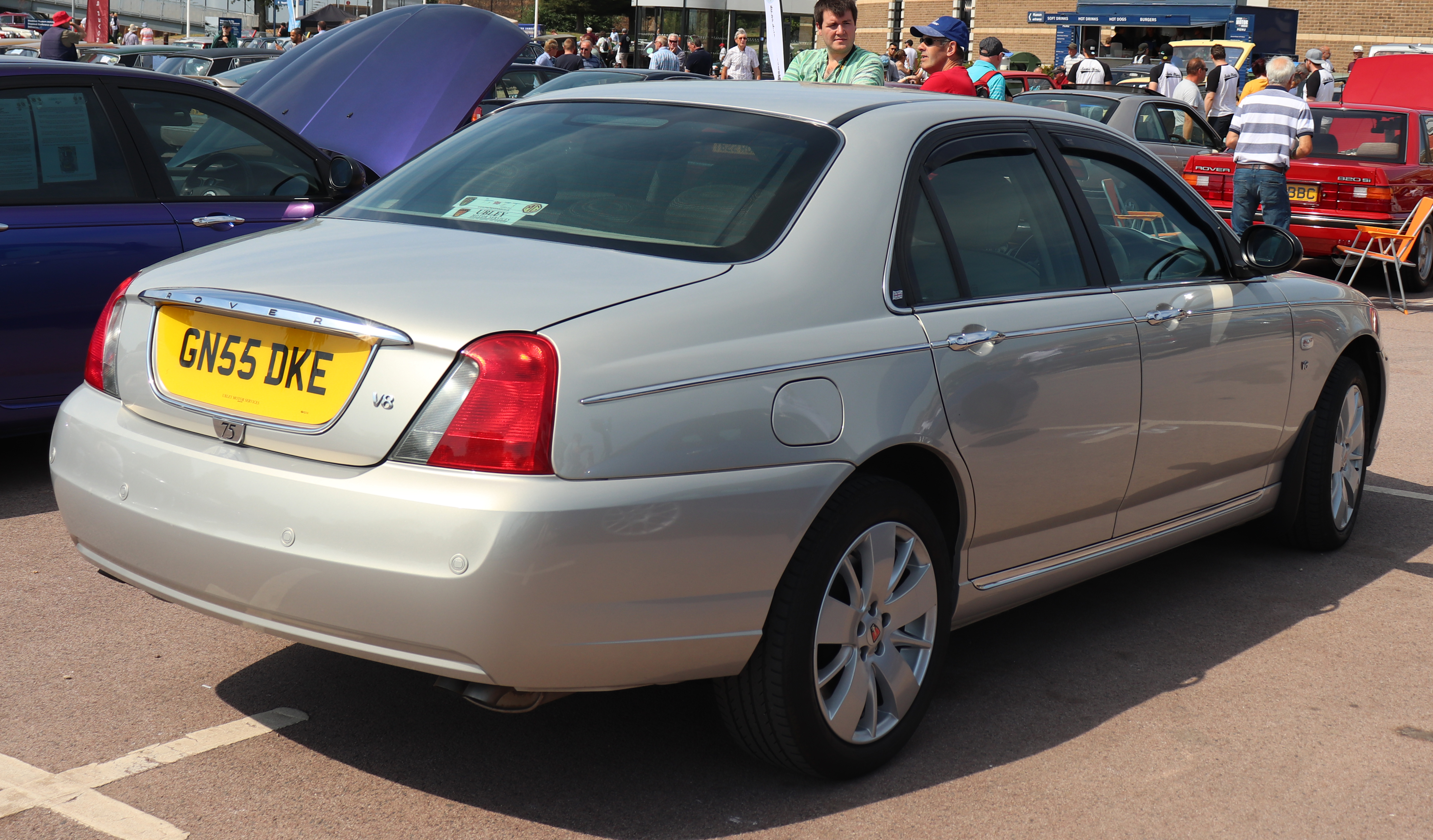
Facelift Rover 75 saloon

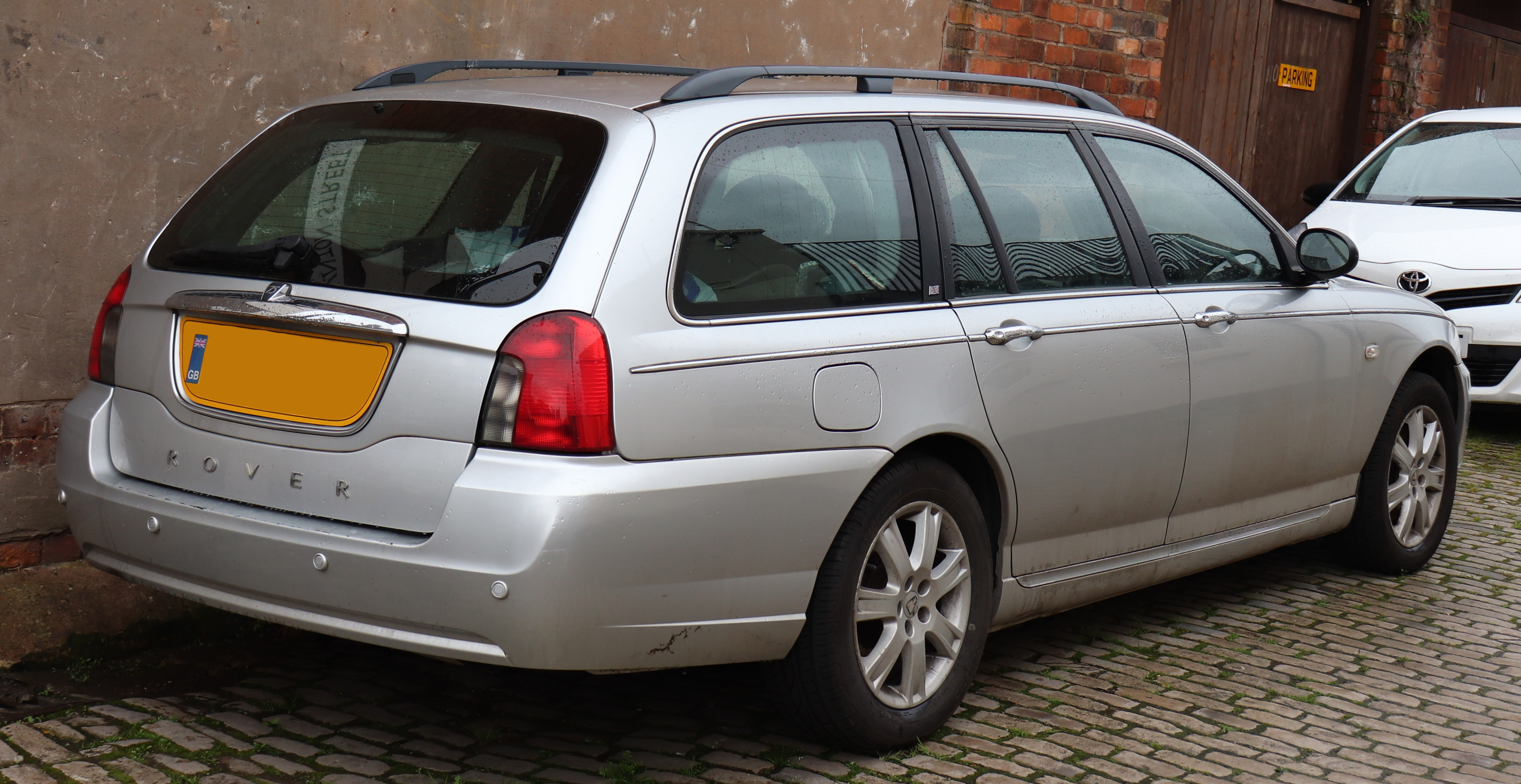
Facelift Rover 75 estate

== Engine specifications ==
The Rover 75 (and MG ZT derivative) were powered by a combination of Rover's own petrol and LPG K-Series and KV6 engines as well as Ford's Modular V8 and BMW's M47 diesel engine. The latter was designated M47R to identify the unit as a Rover special.

Petrol engines
Years	Made By	Model	Engine	Power	Torque	Top Speed	0-62 mph (0–100 km/h)	Economy
1998–2005	Rover	1.8 Manual	1,798 cc - L4 - NA	120 PS (88 kW; 118 hp)	160 N⋅m (118 lbf⋅ft)	121 mph (195 km/h)	10.9 s	36.2 mpg_{‑imp} (7.8 L/100 km)
1998–2005	Rover	1.8 Automatic	1,798 cc - L4 - NA	120 PS (88 kW; 118 hp)	160 N⋅m (118 lbf⋅ft)	118 mph (190 km/h)	12.3 s	30.1 mpg_{‑imp} (9.4 L/100 km)
1998–2002	Rover	2.0 V6 Manual	1,998 cc - V6 - NA	150 PS (110 kW; 148 hp)	185 N⋅m (136 lb⋅ft)	130 mph (209 km/h)	9.6 s	30.1 mpg_{‑imp} (9.4 L/100 km)
1998–2002	Rover	2.0 V6 Automatic	1,998 cc - V6 - NA	150 PS (110 kW; 148 hp)	185 N⋅m (136 lb⋅ft)	127 mph (204 km/h)	10.8 s	27.5 mpg_{‑imp} (10.3 L/100 km)
2002-2005	Rover	1.8 T Manual	1,798 cc - L4 - TC	150 PS (110 kW; 148 hp)	215 N⋅m (159 lb⋅ft)	130 mph (209 km/h)	9.1 s	36.3 mpg_{‑imp} (7.8 L/100 km)
2002-2005	Rover	1.8 T Automatic	1,798 cc - L4 - TC	150 PS (110 kW; 148 hp)	215 N⋅m (159 lb⋅ft)	127 mph (204 km/h)	9.7 s	31.7 mpg_{‑imp} (8.9 L/100 km)
1998–2005	Rover	2.5 V6 Manual	2,498 cc - V6 - NA	177 PS (130 kW; 175 hp)	240 N⋅m (177 lbf⋅ft)	140 mph (225 km/h)	8.2 s	29.4 mpg_{‑imp} (9.6 L/100 km)
1998–2005	Rover	2.5 V6 Automatic	2,498 cc - V6 - NA	177 PS (130 kW; 175 hp)	240 N⋅m (177 lbf⋅ft)	134 mph (216 km/h)	8.9 s	26.9 mpg_{‑imp} (10.5 L/100 km)
2002–2005	Rover	2.5 V6 Automatic LWB	2,498 cc - V6 - NA	177 PS (130 kW; 175 hp)	240 N⋅m (177 lbf⋅ft)	134 mph (216 km/h)	9.9 s	26.6 mpg_{‑imp} (10.6 L/100 km)
2003–2005	Ford	4.6 V8 Manual	4,601 cc - V8 - NA	260 PS (191 kW; 256 hp)	410 N⋅m (302 lbf⋅ft)	155 mph (249 km/h)	6.2 s	23.1 mpg_{‑imp} (12.2 L/100 km)
2003–2005	Ford	4.6 V8 Automatic	4,601 cc - V8 - NA	260 PS (191 kW; 256 hp)	410 N⋅m (302 lbf⋅ft)	151 mph (243 km/h)	7.0 s	22.1 mpg_{‑imp} (12.8 L/100 km)
LPG engines
Years	Made By	Model	Engine	Power	Torque	Top Speed	0-62 mph (0–100 km/h)	Economy
2002–2005	Rover	2.5 V6 LPG Automatic	2,498 cc - V6 - NA	177 PS (130 kW; 175 hp)	240 N⋅m (177 lbf⋅ft)	134 mph (216 km/h)	8.9 s	21.3 mpg_{‑imp} (13.3 L/100 km)
2002–2005	Rover	2.5 V6 LPG Automatic LWB	2,498 cc - V6 - NA	177 PS (130 kW; 175 hp)	240 N⋅m (177 lbf⋅ft)	134 mph (216 km/h)	9.9 s	21.3 mpg_{‑imp} (13.3 L/100 km)
Diesel engines
Years	Made By	Model	Engine	Power	Torque	Top Speed	0-62 mph (0–100 km/h)	Economy
1998–2005	BMW	2.0 CDT Manual	1,951 cc - L4 - TC	116 PS (85 kW; 114 hp)	260 N⋅m (192 lbf⋅ft)	120 mph (193 km/h)	11.0 s	51.4 mpg_{‑imp} (5.50 L/100 km)
1998–2005	BMW	2.0 CDT Automatic	1,951 cc - L4 - TC	116 PS (85 kW; 114 hp)	260 N⋅m (192 lbf⋅ft)	118 mph (190 km/h)	12.2 s	40.9 mpg_{‑imp} (6.91 L/100 km)
2002–2005	BMW	2.0 CDTi Manual	1,951 cc - L4 - TC	131 PS (96 kW; 129 hp)	300 N⋅m (221 lbf⋅ft)	121 mph (195 km/h)	10.0 s	50.0 mpg_{‑imp} (5.65 L/100 km)
2002–2005	BMW	2.0 CDTi Automatic	1,951 cc - L4 - TC	131 PS (96 kW; 129 hp)	300 N⋅m (221 lbf⋅ft)	118 mph (190 km/h)	10.6 s	40.9 mpg_{‑imp} (6.91 L/100 km)
2002–2005	BMW	2.0 CDTi Automatic LWB	1,951 cc - L4 - TC	131 PS (96 kW; 129 hp)	300 N⋅m (221 lbf⋅ft)	118 mph (190 km/h)	11.8 s	40.9 mpg_{‑imp} (6.91 L/100 km)

== Environmental impact ==
Each engine fitted to the Rover and MG flagships were analysed and given a score between 0 (cleanest) to 100 (dirtiest) by Next Green Car.

MG Rover Vehicle	CO_{2}	Score	Competitor Vehicle	CO_{2}	Score
Petrol engines
Rover 75 1.8 Manual; MG ZT 120 Manual	184 g/km	47	Alfa Romeo 156 1.6 T.S. Volkswagen Passat 2.0	195 g/km 206 g/km	52; 55
Rover 75 1.8 Automatic; MG ZT	224 g/km	57	Mitsubishi Galant 2.0 Automatic; Subaru Legacy 2.0 Automatic	224 g/km 224 g/km	60; 61
Rover 75 2.0 V6 Manual; MG ZT	225 g/km	57	Lexus IS 200; Subaru Legacy 2.5	233 g/km 230 g/km	63; 62
Rover 75 2.0 V6 Automatic; MG ZT	245 g/km	60	Mercedes-Benz C240 V6 TouchShift; Hyundai Sonata 2.5 V6 Automatic	256 g/km 246 g/km	63; 59
Rover 75 1.8 T Manual; MG ZT 160 Manual	193 g/km	50	Honda Accord 2.0i VTEC; Peugeot 406 2.2	209 g/km 210 g/km	56; 57
Rover 75 1.8 T Automatic; MG ZT	214 g/km	56	BMW 318i Automatic; SAAB 9-3 1.8T Automatic	220 g/km 221 g/km	60; 59
Rover 75; MG ZT 160 V6 Manual	225 g/km	56	Kia Magentis 2.5 V6	237 g/km	57
Rover 75 2.5 V6 Manual; MG ZT 190 Manual	225 g/km	57	Mitsubishi Galant 2.5 V6; Vauxhall Vectra 2.6i V6 24v	227 g/km 236 g/km	61; 64
Rover 75 2.5 V6 Automatic; MG ZT 180 Automatic	249 g/km	65	Ford Mondeo 2.5i V6 Automatic; Mazda Xedos 9 2.5 Automatic	253 g/km 258 g/km	68; 69
Rover 75; MG ZT 260 Manual	314 g/km	78	Volkswagen Passat 4.0 W8 4MOTION	317 g/km	80
Rover 75 4.6 V8 Automatic; MG ZT	319 g/km	79	Volkswagen Passat 4.0 W8 4MOTION Tiptronic	312 g/km	79
LPG engines
Rover 75 2.5 V6 LPG Automatic; MG ZT	214 g/km	44	Volvo S60 2.4 Bi-Fuel LPG Geartronic	227 g/km	61
Diesel engines
Rover 75 2.0 CDT 116 Manual; MG ZT 120 CDTi Manual	163 g/km	55	Peugeot 406 2.0 HDi 90; SAAB 9-3 2.2 TiD	150 g/km 164 g/km	60; 65
Rover 75 2.0 CDT 116 Automatic; MG ZT 120 CDTi Automatic	190 g/km	65	Audi A4 1.9 TDI PD 115 Tiptronic	184 g/km	71
Rover 75 2.0 CDTi 131 Manual; MG ZT 135 CDTi Manual	163 g/km	55	Audi A4 1.9 TDI PD 130 Quattro; Mercedes-Benz C220 CDI	175 g/km 170g/km	66; 63
Rover 75 2.0 CDTi 131 Automatic; MG ZT 135 CDTi Automatic	190 g/km	65	Ford Mondeo 2.0 TDCi 130 Automatic; Vauxhall Vectra 2.2 DTi 16v Automatic	203 g/km 208 g/km	76; 75

== Safety ==
The Rover 75 was designed with reinforced footwells, underfloor box beams, side impact bars and a "ring of steel" around each door opening to prevent jamming in case of an impact. Driver and front passenger head and side airbags are fitted as standard, with side head "windowbags" available as an option until 2005 when they became standard equipment. If the window airbags had been standard equipment at the time of its Euro NCAP crash test in 2001, it would have scored the full five stars for the adult occupant impact rating. Also fitted are disc brakes all round, anti-lock brakes (ABS), electronic brakeforce distribution (EBD) with a traction control system (TCS) available as an option on 2.0 engines and above. On models fitted with Rover's Hi-Line infotainment system, a speed warning indicator was also included. Additionally, electronic stability control (ESC) was due to be made standard fitment on the 75 from the 2006 model year onwards.

The 75 underwent Euro NCAP and ANCAP car safety tests in 2001.

The Rover 75 achieved the following ratings:

Euro NCAP 2001 75	Points	Rating
Adult Occupant:	30 out of 36	4/5 stars
Pedestrian Impact:	13 out of 36	2/4 stars

ANCAP test results* MG Rover 75 saloon (2001)
Test	Score
Overall	4 /5 stars
Frontal offset	13.78/16
Side impact	16/16
Pole	Not Assessed
Seat belt reminders	0/3
Whiplash protection	Not Assessed
Pedestrian protection	Not Assessed
Electronic stability control	Not Assessed

All seats have anti-submarine ramps and three-point inertia reel seat belts with pre-tensioners, while the front seats get additional load limiters and automatic belt height adjustment as standard. In certain markets a seat belt reminder for the driver was fitted. Each seat has an adjustable head restraint with the front ones pivoting on SE models. Thatcham's NCWR organisation (New Car Whiplash Ratings) tested the Rover 75 and awarded it the following scores:

NCWR	Score
Geometric:	G
Dynamic:	M
Overall:	M

G = Good A = Acceptable M = Marginal P = Poor

== Security ==
A perimetric (and optional volumetric) alarm, engine immobiliser and remote-control central locking with deadbolts are standard equipment on the 75. Alloy wheels are fitted with locking wheel nuts. Automatic locking when driving off is standard, but can be disabled by a dealer. On the inside is a master locking switch and the boot can only be opened by remote control or an interior button. A battery back-up sounder and tracking device called Trackstar were available as options.

The 75 was tested by Thatcham's New Vehicle Security Ratings (NVSR) organisation and achieved the following ratings:

Saloon	Rating
Theft of car:	4/5 stars
Theft from car:	3/5 stars

Tourer	Rating
Theft of car:	4/5 stars
Theft from car:	2/5 stars

== Popularity ==
Initial sales of the Rover 75 failed to match the BMW 3 Series and Audi A4 in the British car sales charts during 1999. The public unveiling of the car at the Birmingham Motor Show drew favourable reactions, but was unfortunately overshadowed by a press conference afterwards by BMW chairman, Bernd Pischetsrieder, containing criticism of the UK Government's attitude to financial assistance in the redevelopment of the Rover Longbridge factory (where the new Mini and R30 were to have been produced), and effectively suggesting that Rover was in crisis. Press reaction interpreted this as saying that BMW were unhappy with continuing financial losses and were intending to close Rover down. This undoubtedly scared off many prospective buyers, despite the very positive reaction to the car itself. Indeed, it did (and still does) hold up very well with the Jaguar S-Type that was unveiled at the same show. Rover's brand image also hurt the 75 against competitors despite its positive reception.

Sales picked up substantially during 2000, and it was Britain's fifth-most popular new car in the month of April of that year. It was still selling reasonably well at the time of MG Rover's bankruptcy in April 2005, and a small number of unsold 75s were still in stock as of early 2007, as Nanjing Automobile was preparing to reopen Longbridge.

Based on the combination of safety, performance and maintainability, the Rover 75 was found in 2011 to be the cheapest car to insure in the United Kingdom across all age groups.

=== Production ===
Year	Production
1999	53,581
2000	31,545
2001	33,883
2002	32,123
2003	30,449
2004	24,156
2005	5,439
Total	211,175

== Models ==
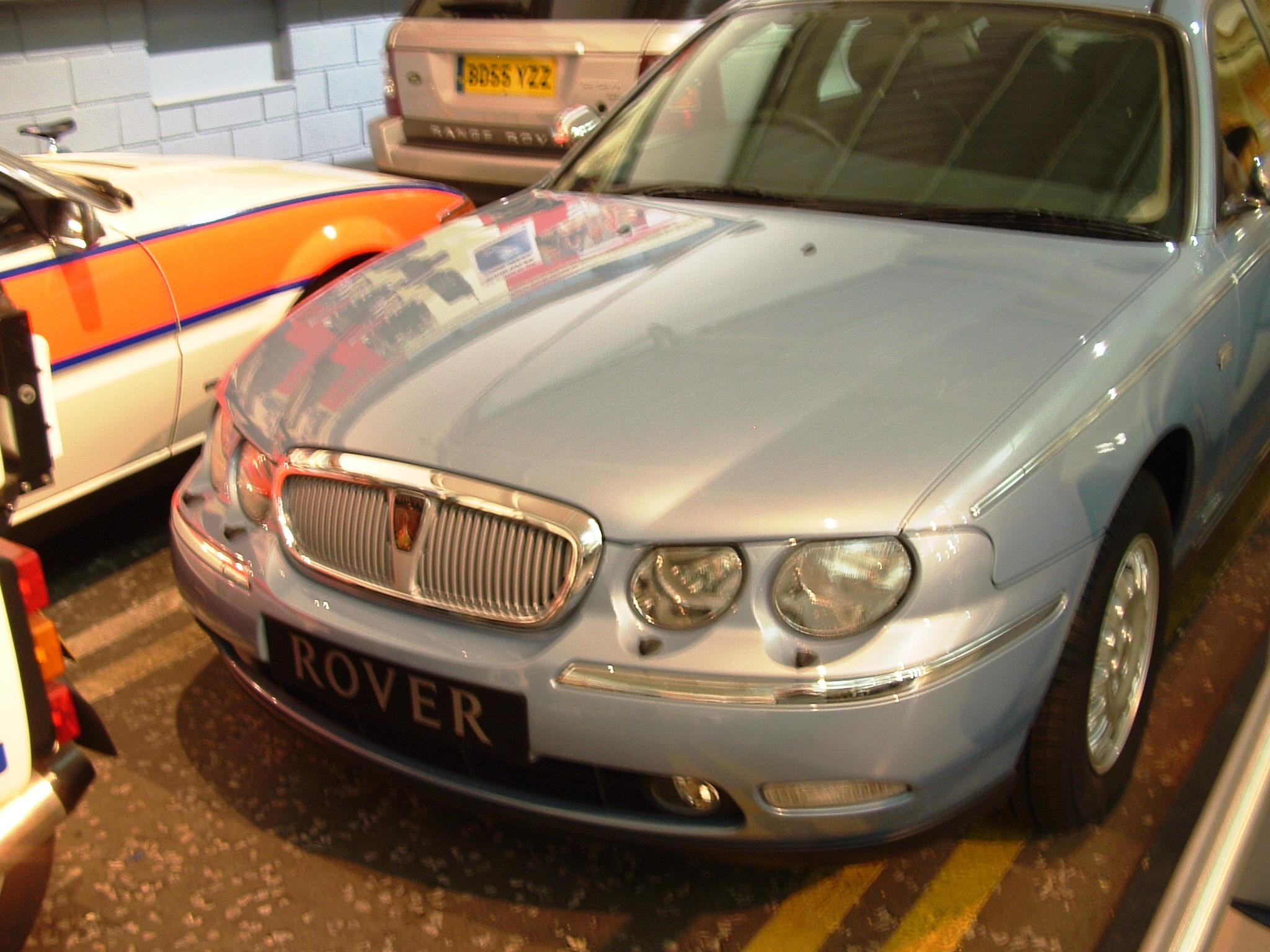
The first production Rover 75 model, a V6 Connoisseur, 1998

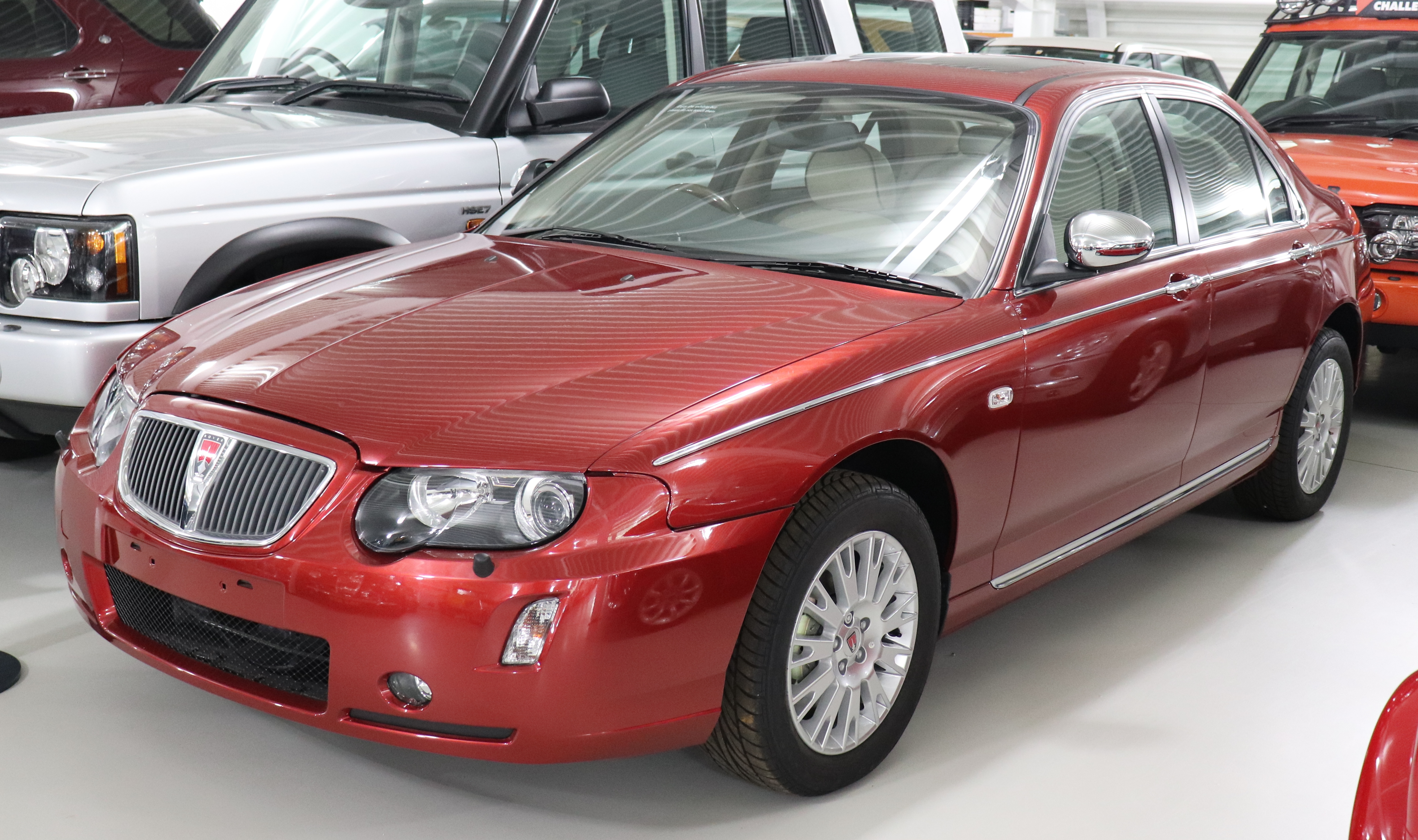
The last production Rover 75 model, a CDTi Connoisseur, 2005

1998 – 2004 (Mark I)

- Classic
- Classic SE
- Club
- Club SE
- Connoisseur
- Connoisseur SE
- Vanden Plas (LWB model)

2004 – 2005 (Mark II)

- Classic
- Contemporary
- Contemporary SE
- Connoisseur
- Connoisseur SE
- Sport (Portugal)
- Limousine (LWB model)

2006 – 2016 (Roewe 750)

- 1.8 Turbo Base (18K4G, modified Rover K-Series)
- 1.8 Turbo High-Line (18K4G, modified Rover K-Series)
- 2.5 Base (25K4F, modified Rover KV6)
- 2.5 High-Line o9629 (25K4F, modified Rover KV6)

== Reviews ==
- Auto Trader
  "The 75's biggest problem was its image; potential buyers just assumed it was hopelessly outclassed by rivals. Nothing could be further from the truth though, as the car could compete on equal terms with some prestigious adversaries"
- Honest John
  Positives: A fine looking car from all angles. Destined to become a classic
  Negatives: Let down by cooling system problems on all K-Series engines, particularly the 1.8
- Parker's
  Pros: Rover refinement and heritage. Handsome looks and a charming, comfortable interior.
  Cons: Mid-range Audi, BMW and Mercedes-Benz [rivals].
- RAC
  "The Rover 75 Tourer is one of those rare ... cars that retains a genuine sense of occasion whenever you get behind the wheel. The retro clocks and the buttoned down rectitude of the detailing all contributes to a huge feel good factor."
- Verdict On Cars
  "Recommended. The standard 75 has an elegance missing from German executive car rivals, with wood and leather harking back to a bygone age. The Tourer estate models are, surprisingly, even prettier and very practical indeed."
- What Car?
  For - It's excellent over long distances and smooths out bumps like a luxury car. It's cheap, well equipped and practical, and comes with olde-worlde charm.
  Against - The rear seats are cramped and you get a much sharper drive from its German rivals.
- Which?
  For: rock-bottom prices | strong diesel engine | lots of equipment | comfortable
  Against: patchy reliability | hefty depreciation | no dealer network | limited warranty
- Wise Buyer's
  "The elegant 75 showed that Rover ... could build a quality executive car that"s refined, reliable, good to drive [with] real presence.'

== Awards and accolades ==
1999

- What Car? – 'Car of the Year'
- What Car? – 'Compact Executive Car of the Year'
- What Car? – 'Diesel Car of the Year'
- Auto Express – 'World Car'
- Journal/AA – 'Business Car of the Year'
- Italy – 'World's Most Beautiful High Class Saloon'
- Bild am Sonntag – 'Golden Steering Wheel Award'
- The Society of Plastic Engineers – Innovative Use of Plastic
- British International Motor Show – Best Riding And Handling FWD Saloon in the World
- Japan – 'Import Car of the Year' (1999–2000)
- Middle East Wheels & Gears – 'Car of the Year'

2000

- Middle East Wheels & Gears – 'Car of the Year'
- New Zealand's National Business Review – 'Car of the Year'
- Executive Class – 'Portuguese Car of the Year'
- What Car? – 'Compact Executive Car of the Year'
- 2000 'European Car of the Year' Awards: Only Executive Car Short Listed
- Used Car Buyer – 'Used Car of the Year'

2001

- Used Car Buyer – 'Used Car of the Year'
- Diesel Car Magazine – 'Compact Executive Car'
- JD Power Survey – Only European Car in the Top 5

2002

- Auto Express Used Car Honours – 'Best Diesel Car'
- Used Car Buyer – 'Best Used Medium Car'
- ITM – 'Car of the Year'
- Australian Institute of Transport Management – 'Car of the Year'

2004

- Used Car Buyer – 'Used Car of the Year'
- Used Car Buyer – 'Best Used Family Car of the Year'
- Most Popular British Armed Forces Tax Free Car Purchase

2006

- Auto Express Driver Power – 'Best Ride Quality' (1st)

2007

- Auto Trader Used Car Awards – 'Best Family Car'

2010

- Auto Express Driver Power – 'Best Ride Quality' (2nd)

2011

- Auto Express Driver Power – 'Best Ride Quality' (1st)

== Chinese production ==
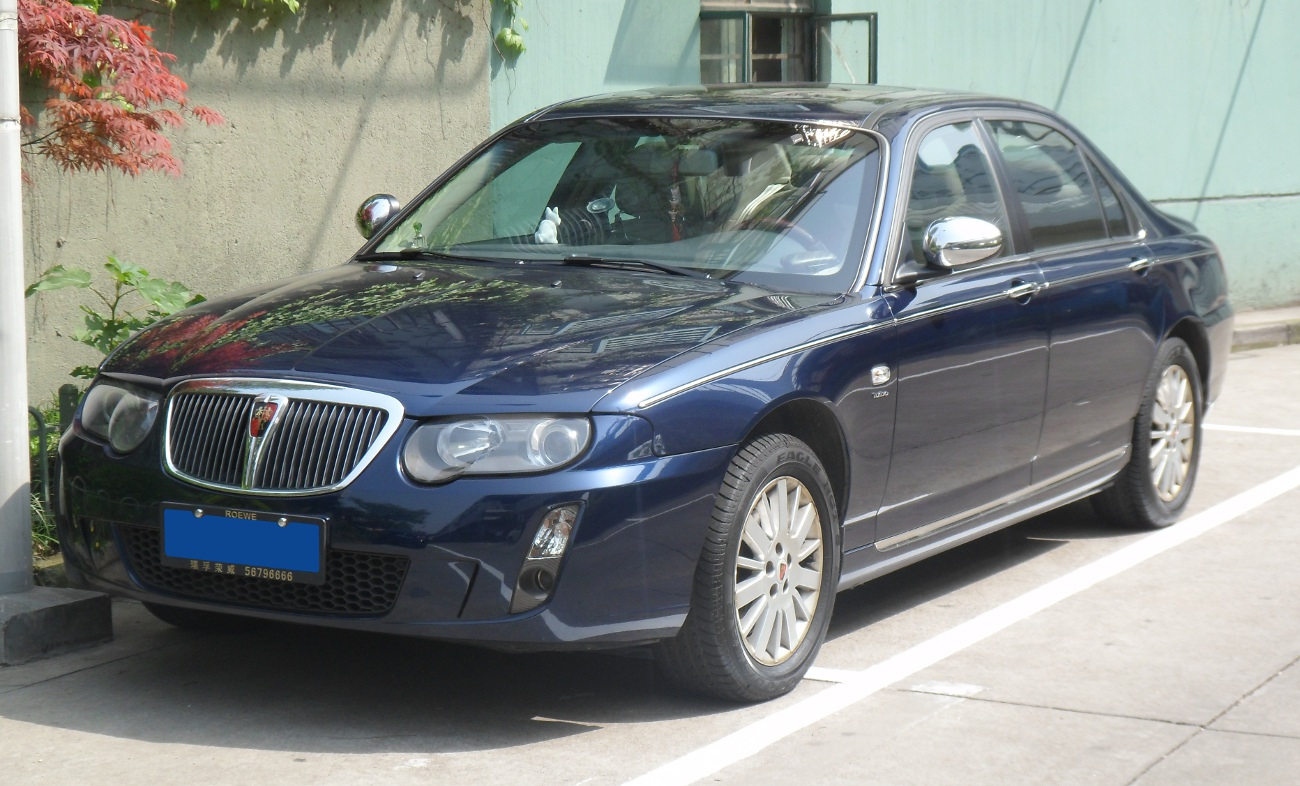
Roewe 750

Production of the Rover 75 and MG ZT ended when MG Rover Group went into administration in April 2005. The Rover 75 design was purchased by Shanghai Automotive Industry Corporation (SAIC) in early 2005, although the new MG Rover Group owner, Nanjing Automobile Corporation (NAC) acquired the tooling for the car. Both companies launched revised versions of the 75/ZT in China. SAIC's model was named the Roewe 750 (following the purchase of the Rover brand by Ford, the Roewe marque was created by SAIC for use worldwide) and NAC's the MG 7.

The Roewe brand and Roewe 750 were launched at the Beijing Motor Show in November 2006. The 750 is based on the long-wheelbase 75 platform, and engineering was completed by Ricardo 2010.

The MG 7 was launched in March 2007. NAC also introduced a long-wheelbase version of the MG 7, called the MG 7L.

== Brilliance B8 ==
Shortly before the collapse of Rover, Brilliance, who, like Rover, had a partnership with BMW, was looking to expand their product line with a big saloon. They approached Rover regarding the Rover 75. As a demo, Rover exported 24 Brilliance B8s to China that were then sold through dealerships, although the cars were only meant to be prototypes. Because the deal never happened, they are still the only 24 Brilliance B8s.
