= Midas Bronze =

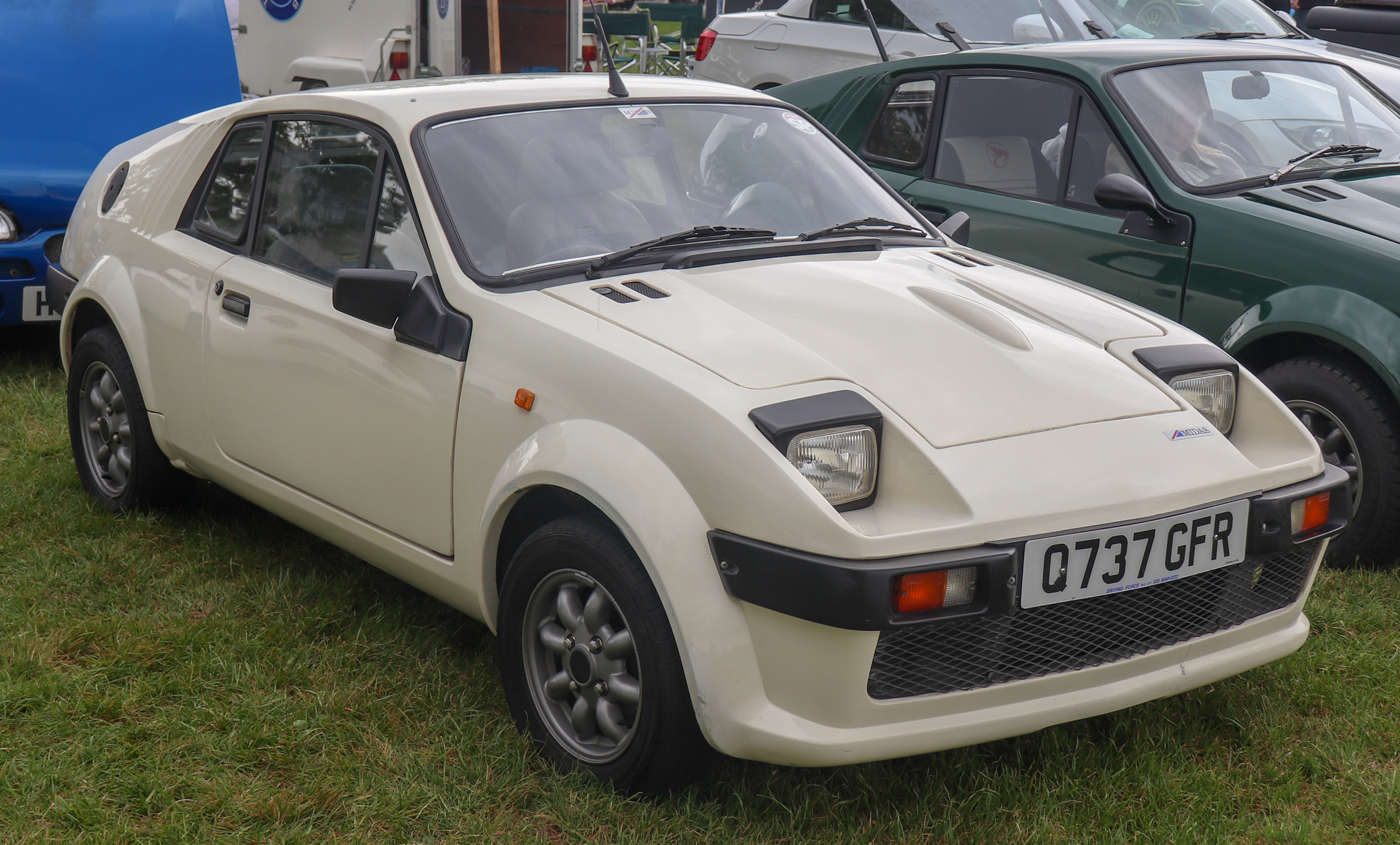

Overview
- Manufacturer: 1978–81: D&H Fibreglass Techniques; 1981–89 Midas Cars
- Also called: Midas Cortez; Midas Excelsior; Midas Gold; Midas Silver
- Production: 1978–89
- Designer: Richard Oakes

Body and chassis
- Body style: 2-door coupé

The Midas Bronze is a Mini-based kit car designed by Richard Oakes whose curriculum vitae includes the Tramp Beach Buggy, Nova kit car, Dutton Sierra SUV, the GTM Rossa and GTM Libra sportscars, Pimlico Domino Mini, the Jephcott leaning 3-wheeler, and Blackjack Cars). It would be manufactured by D&H Fibreglass Techniques, set up by Harold Dermott and Maurice Holt in 1975. Their initial production facility was in Oldham, England, but when they outgrew that they moved to larger premises in Corby.

The Midas was the first original vehicle from D&H, which had been first established to build the Mini Marcos. Richard Oakes, an established kit car designer, was commissioned to develop the new car, the design of which was complete by early 1978. It was originally only offered as a kit, without mechanicals, but Midas went on to offer cars at different levels of completion, up to the Gold model which was delivered already fitted with a brand new engine and transmission. They eventually gained type approval and were briefly able to offer complete cars.

== Mark 1 - Midas Coupé ==
A prototype version of the Midas was shown that year at the Performance Car Show at London's Alexandra Palace, to an "enthusiastic" reception. The Midas was offered as a complete kit, minus engine and gearbox, for £3250 (equivalent to £17,800 in 2025 (Note: UK Consumer Price Index inflation figures from 1209–2024 based on data from "Inflation calculator", Bank of England, London, 18 February 2026)); the first deliveries were made in August 1979. Fifty-seven Mark 1s were produced before the introduction of the Mark 2 in 1981.

The Midas is built around an all-composite monocoque body shell of "exceptional quality". The car used the Mini engine/gearbox and front subframe, but the rear subframe was replaced by a beam on which the Mini's trailing arms were hinged. The suspension was developed by ex-Team Lotus engineer Arthur Birchall. Most parts came from the Mini, with notable exceptions: the windshield (and wipers) came from the Fiat 126, while the wing mirrors were Renault 14 units.

== Mark 2 - Midas Gold/Silver/Bronze ==
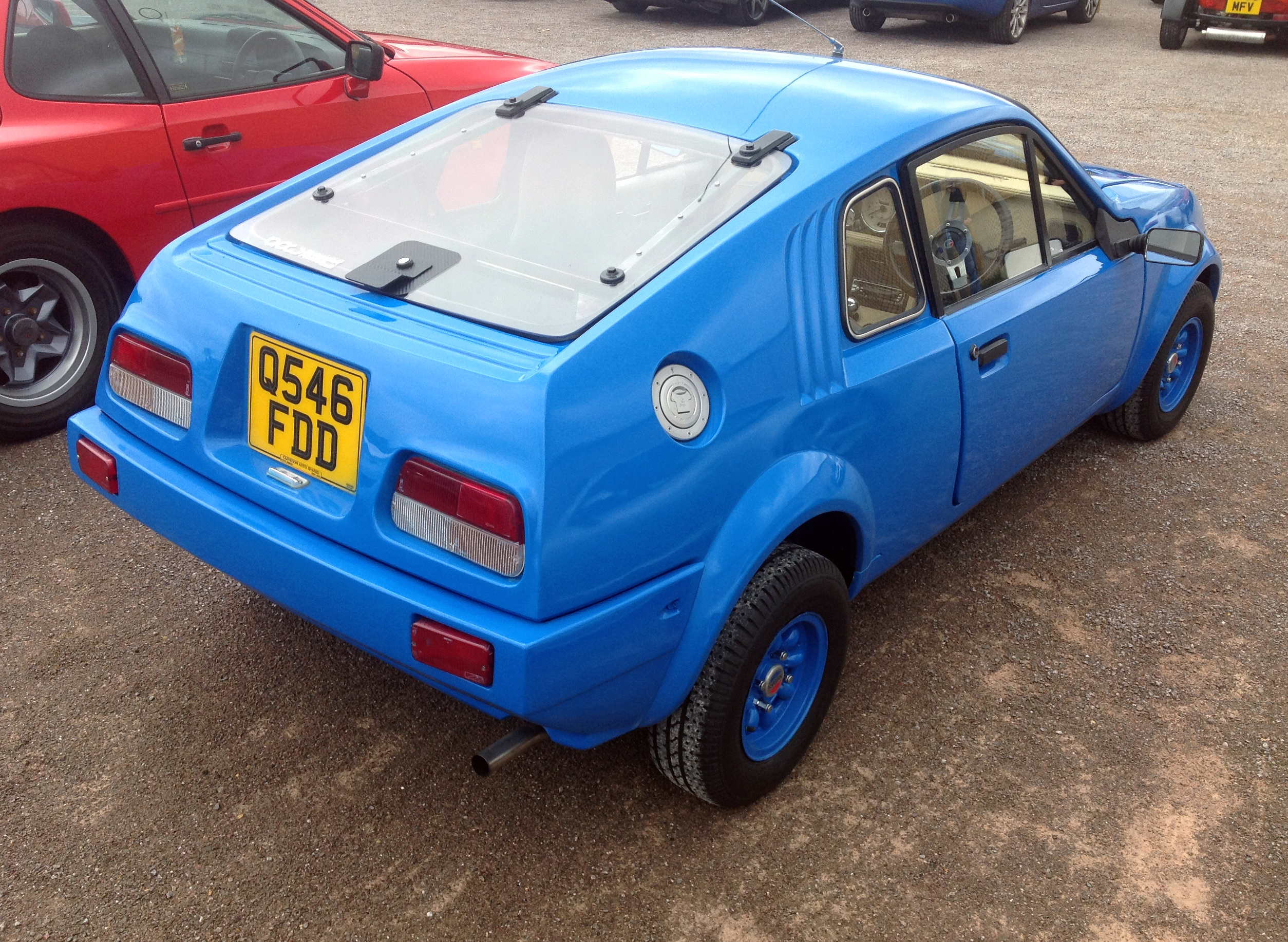
Rear

Gordon Murray, technical director of Brabham, a British Formula One racing car manufacturer, became interested in the Midas, and at Dermott's invitation suggested some modifications to the car to make it more aerodynamic. Murray's suggestions were incorporated into the Midas Mark 2, introduced in 1981 and continuing in production until 1989. The initial version was called the Midas Gold; this was sold nearly complete, requiring only the installation of seats, rear brakes, and rear suspension. The kit included brand-new mechanicals, including engine and transmission. As the kit was somewhat costly, Midas added the "Silver", which required considerably more time to assemble and did not include a new engine and transmission. This was followed in 1984 by the even less complete "Bronze" version, which omitted the trim package, mechanical package, and electrical parts. After the 1985 introduction of the Mark 3 Midas, the Mark 2 was sold as the Midas Bronze.

== Mark 3 - Midas Gold ==
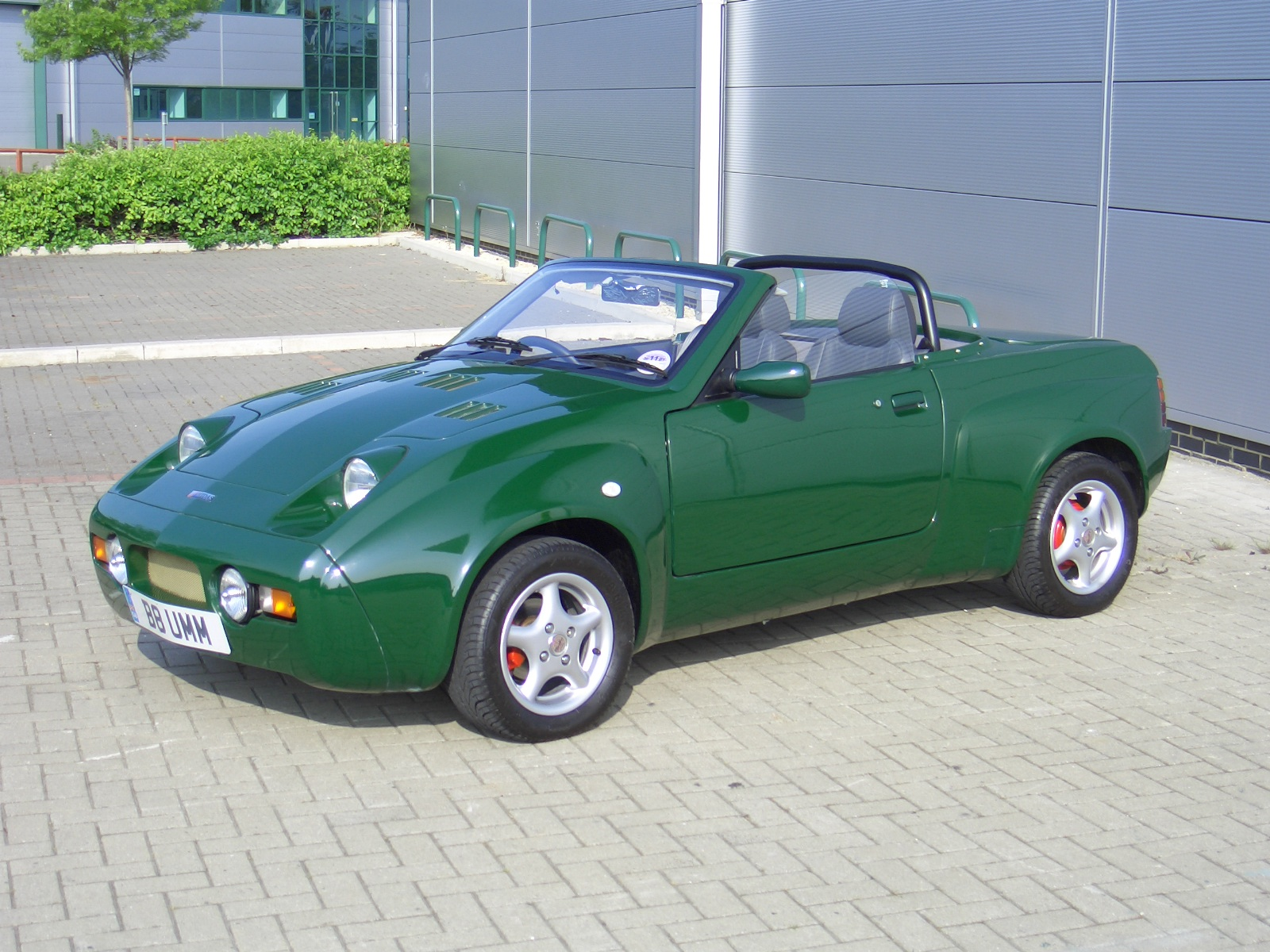
Midas Gold convertible

The Midas Gold coupé was first shown at the October 1985 Motorfair in London. Of a more muscular, rounded appearance and with larger rear quarter windows (improving rearward visibility, which had been an issue on the original design), the new car used Metro underpinnnings. The only visible part which was kept from the original Midas were the doors. The Midas Bronze, the simplest, Mini-based kit version of the Mark 2, continued in production until 1989, however. The Midas Gold convertible was introduced in 1989, "to much critical acclaim", but the Midas factory was destroyed by fire in November that year, ending all production and pushing Midas Cars into liquidation.

== Later developments ==
Pastiche Cars bought the rights to the Midas range in 1990, and relaunched the Midas Gold Convertible, albeit with a somewhat reduced specification. But after taking ten orders for the kit, none of which were supplied, Pastiche too went into liquidation, in 1991. GTM Cars then took over the rights to the Midas range and relaunched the brand at the Sandown Park Kit Car Show in August 1991. GTM introduced new models, including the 2+2 in coupé and convertible versions.

In 2001 GTM sold the Midas operation to Midas Cars, a new company based in Redditch and run by Marc Bailey. He renamed the 2+2 Coupé the Cortez, and the 2+2 Convertible as the Excelsior; the latter made its first public appearance at the Donington Kit Car Show in September 2001. These were redesigned to use the egg-shaped headlights from the Rover 100. Bailey's operation was short-lived however, and Midas Cars ceased trading in 2003. The Midas marque then passed to Alternative Cars in early 2004, who initially kept building the Cortez and Excelsior models. In 2006, Alternative Cars once again started offering the Gold Convertible. In 2008, amongst an economic downturn, they stopped offering new kits, instead focusing on selling parts to keep existing Midases running. The company was able to repatriate the molds for the Midas Gold Coupé from Berlin, and currently offer full bodyshells for the Gold Convertible as well as the Cortez and Excelsior.

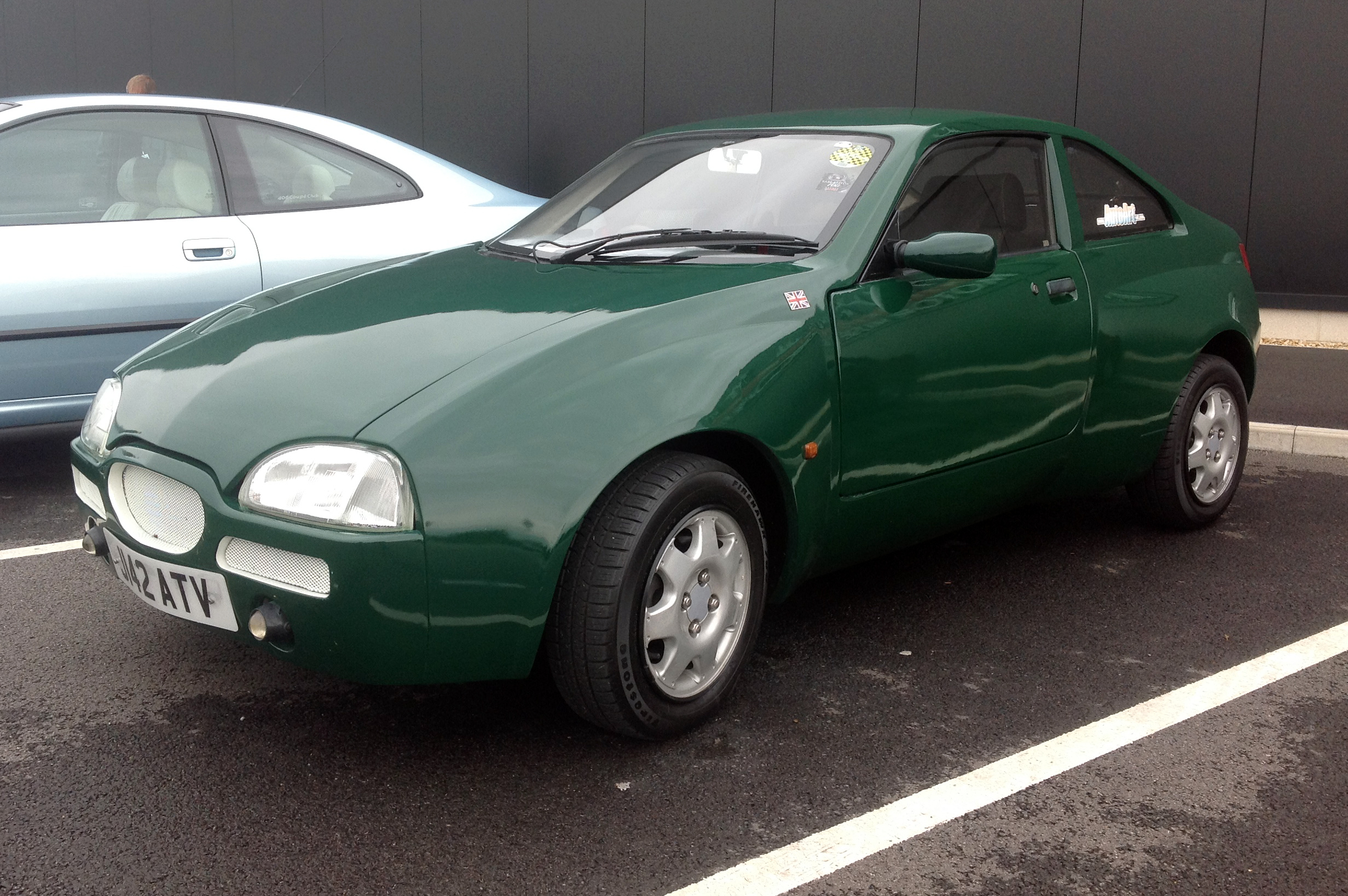
Midas Cortez

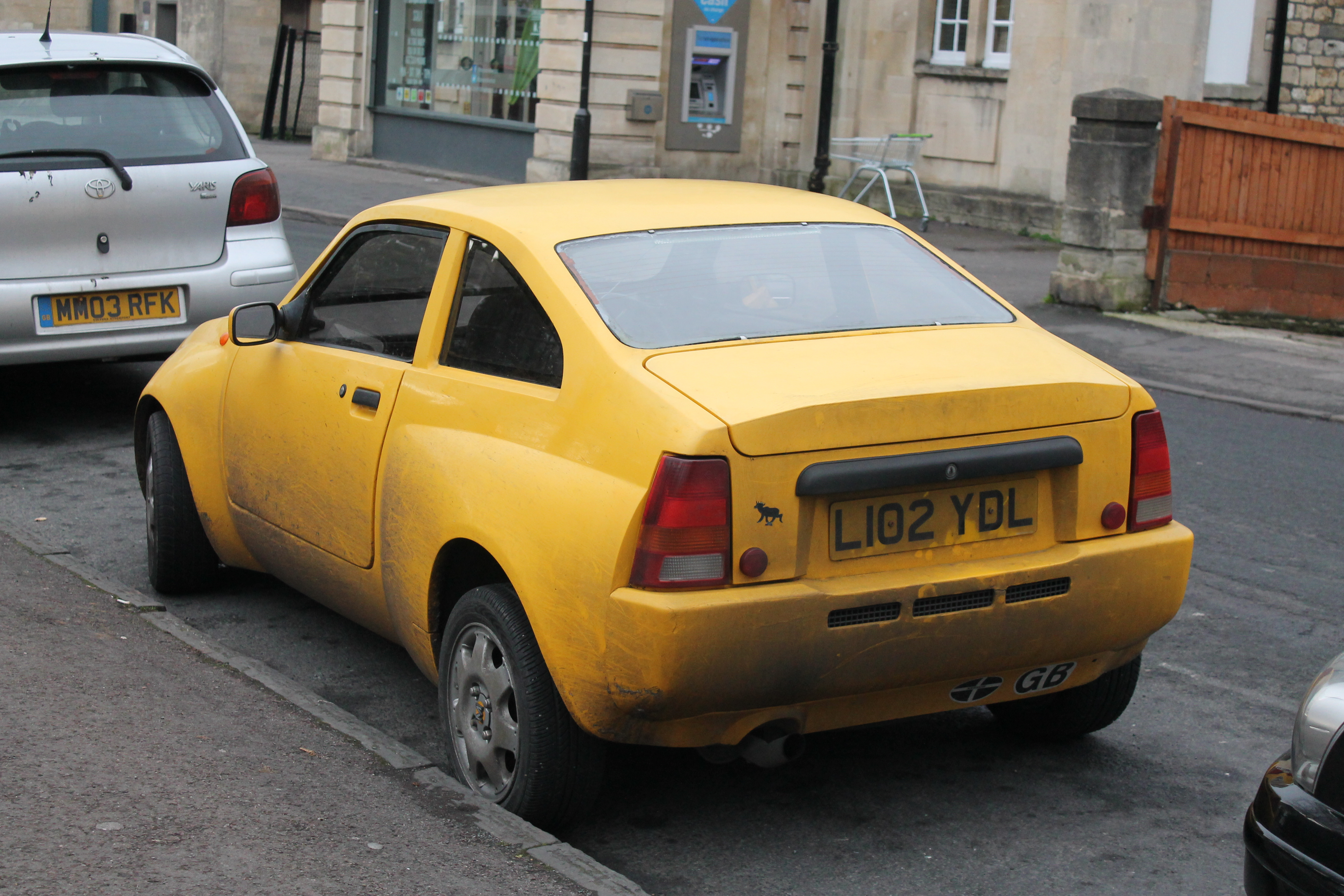
Midas Cortez (rear)

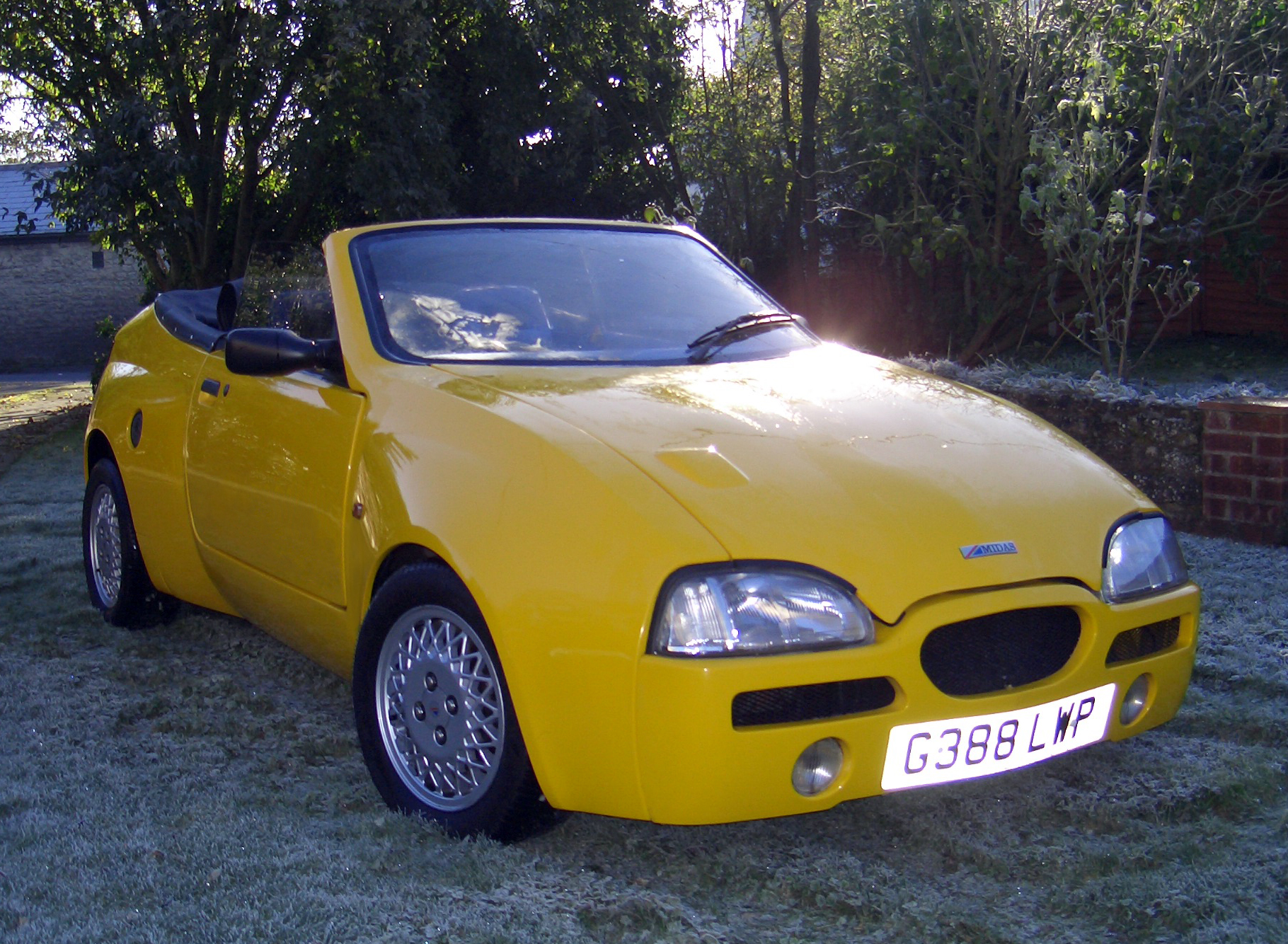
Midas Excelsior; roadster version of the Cortez
