= Midas Cars =

Midas
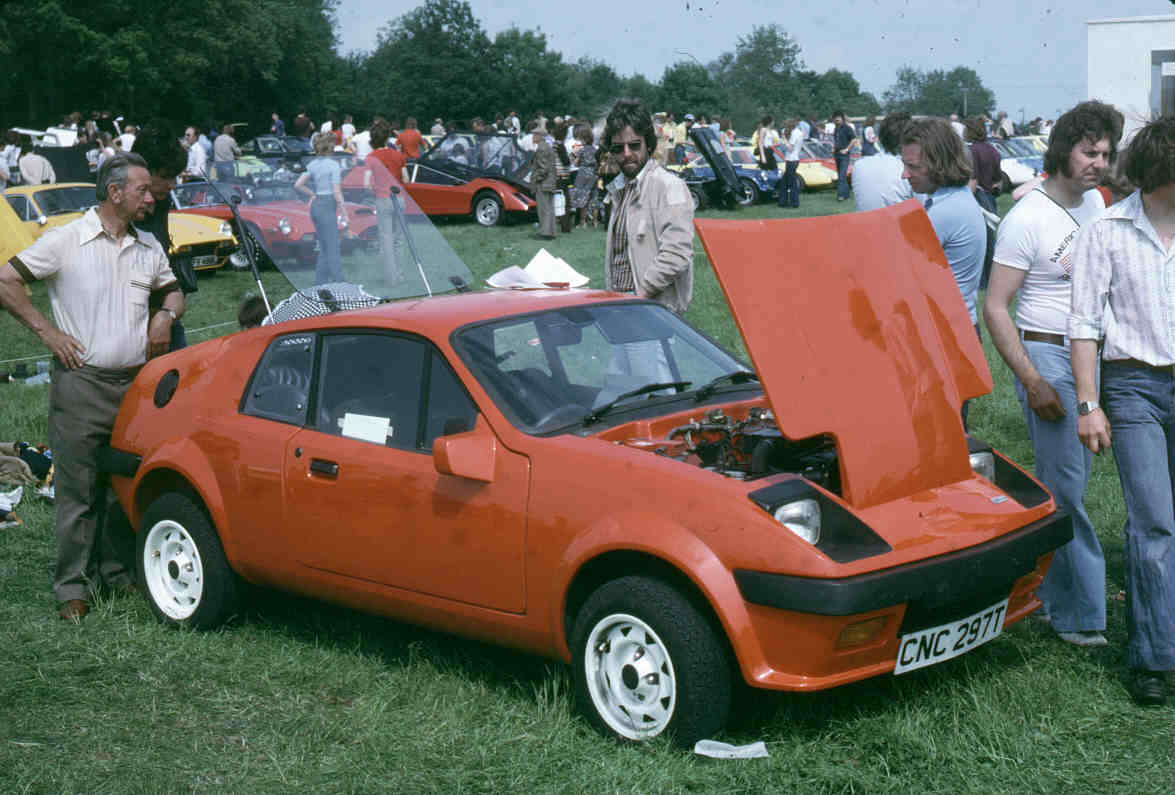

Overview
- Manufacturer: D&H Fibreglass Techniques (1978–1990); Pastiche Cars (1990–1991); GTM Cars (1991–2003); Alternative Cars Ltd (2003–present)
- Production: 1978–present
- Designer: Richard Oakes & Gordon Murray

Body and chassis
- Body style: 2-door coupé and convertible

Powertrain
- Engine: Various
- Transmission: 4-speed manual 5-speed manual CVT automatic

Chronology
- Predecessor: Mini Marcos

The Midas is a British made kit car initially using Mini running gear.

Harold Dermott and his company, D&H Fibreglass Techniques, of Greenfield, Oldham, Greater Manchester, England came to an agreement in 1975 with Marcos cars to take over production of their Mini Marcos model. The car, with its odd-ball looks, was looking outdated so Dermott asked the designer Richard Oakes to come up with a new model. The new car, which was called the Midas, was launched at the 1978 Performance Car Show in London. The car had a composite body with no chassis, using the Mini engine/gearbox and front subframe but replacing the rear subframe with a beam on which the trailing arms were hinged.

In 1981 an updated model was introduced with improvements suggested by Gordon Murray of the Brabham Formula 1 team at the time. The car was available in three versions called Gold and Bronze depending on completeness. Demand for cars was now outstripping the small workshop in Oldham so a move was made to a factory in Corby, Northamptonshire and the company name changed to Midas Cars Ltd.

The September 1981 issue of Motor Magazine carried a review of the new car which was subsequently used for advertising: “100 mph, 41.2 mpg, 0-60 in 9.9 secs, & it will never rust.” In adverts the company claimed the Midas Gold was “Britain’s economy superstar” with a lifetime no-rust warranty, and readers were urged to address enquiries to Harold Dermott himself at the Corby works.

Further improvements were made in 1985 when the Midas Gold was adapted to take Austin or MG Metro parts. A restyle was also made at the same time, again by Richard Oakes, involving wider wings, a "frogeye" front and larger windows. Gordon Murray provided input to improve the aerodynamics. In order to sell complete cars as well as kits a Midas successfully underwent a full ECE12 crash test. A convertible version appeared in 1989 and featured on the front cover of Car magazine, but all production stopped in March 1989 when the premises were destroyed by fire.

== New ownership ==
The rights to the car were purchased in 1990 by Pastiche Cars of Rotherham, Yorkshire who relaunched the range and made a handful of convertibles before the receivers were called in again in 1991 and sold the Gold Convertible on to GTM Cars of Sutton Bonnington, Nottinghamshire. GTM added a series of changes including Hydragas suspension and a hardtop. The range continued to develop with, in 1995 a new 2+2 coupé based on the K-Series engined Metro and Rover 100 models.

The moulds of the Gold coupe were sold to Berlin, Germany by GTM in 1990 where they were used for an unemployment project. In the meantime the old Mini based Midas had reappeared being made by Midtech cars for a short time.

In 2001 the Midas changed hands again when GTM sold it to a new Midas Cars Ltd based in Redditch, West Midlands. The range now consisted of the Coupé, renamed the Cortez, and a K-Series powered coupe and convertible named the Excelsior. Although the cars were well received the company went into liquidation in 2003.

A new company, Alternative Cars Ltd was set up in 2003 and in 2004 restarted production of kit form versions of the Gold Convertible, Cortez and Excelsior based in a small workshop unit at Clanfield, Oxfordshire. In 2007 the Midas Owners Club rediscovered the Gold coupe moulds in Germany and bought them and were imported back to England.

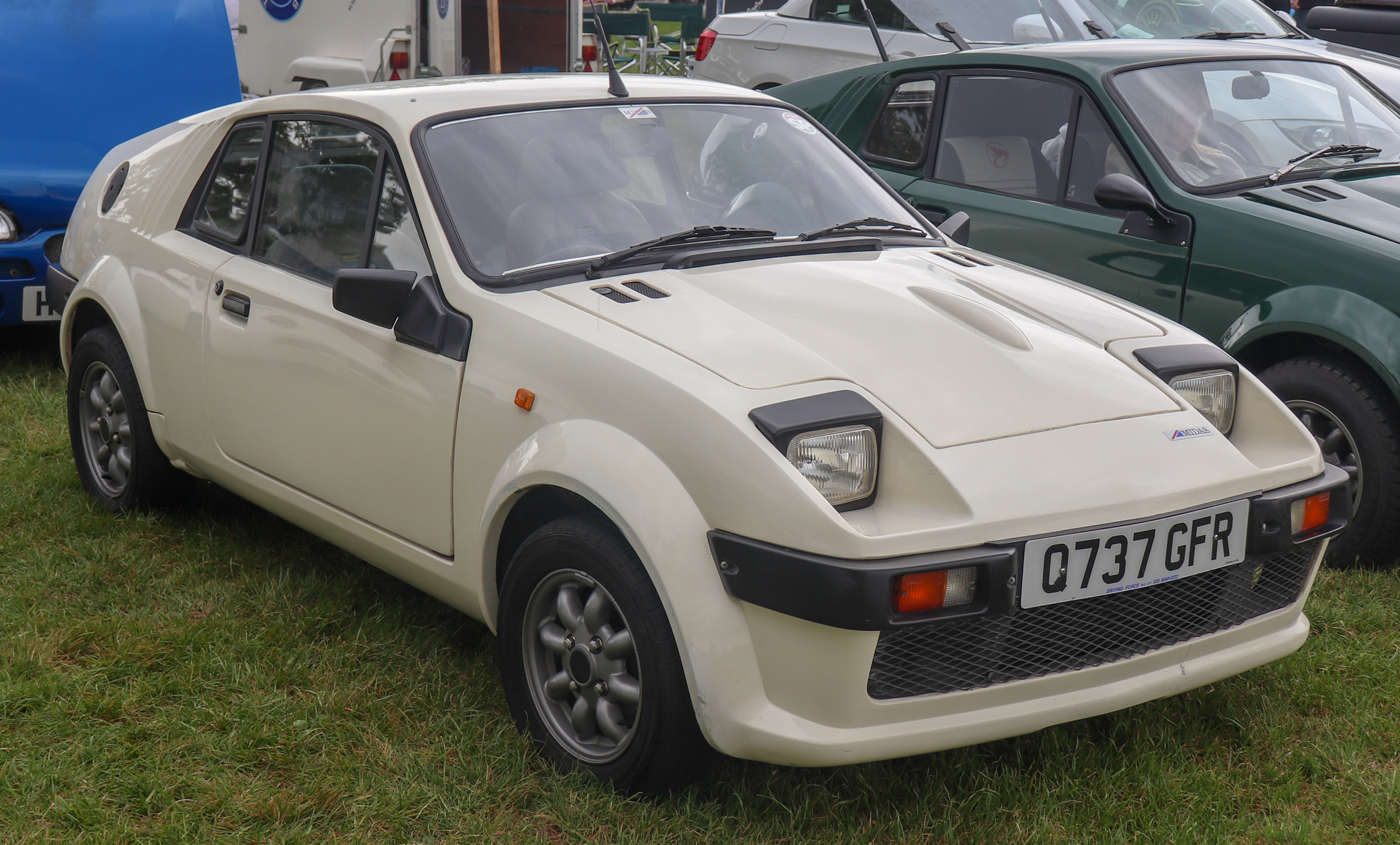
Midas Bronze Coupe 1985–1990

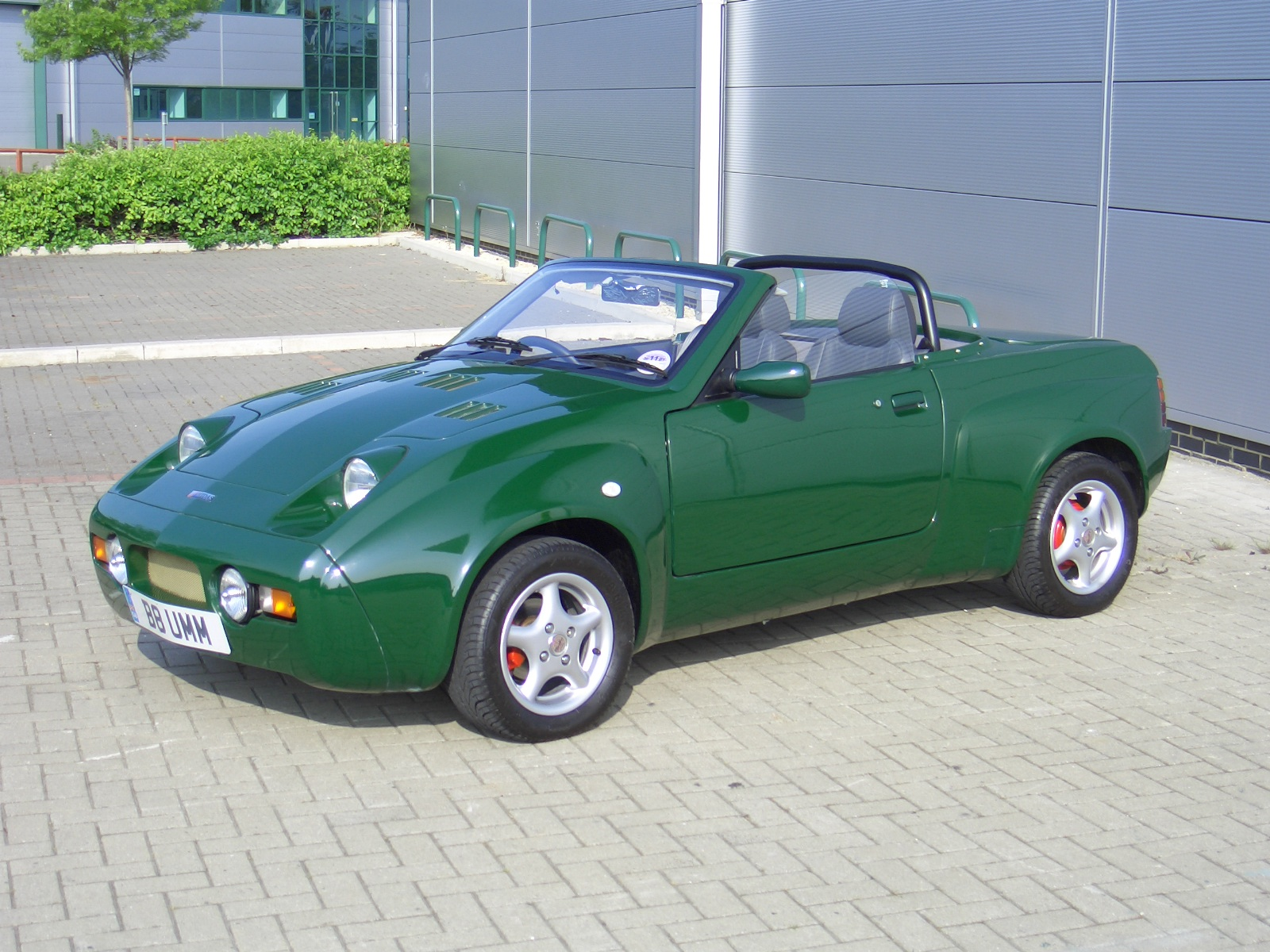
Midas Gold Convertible 1989–present

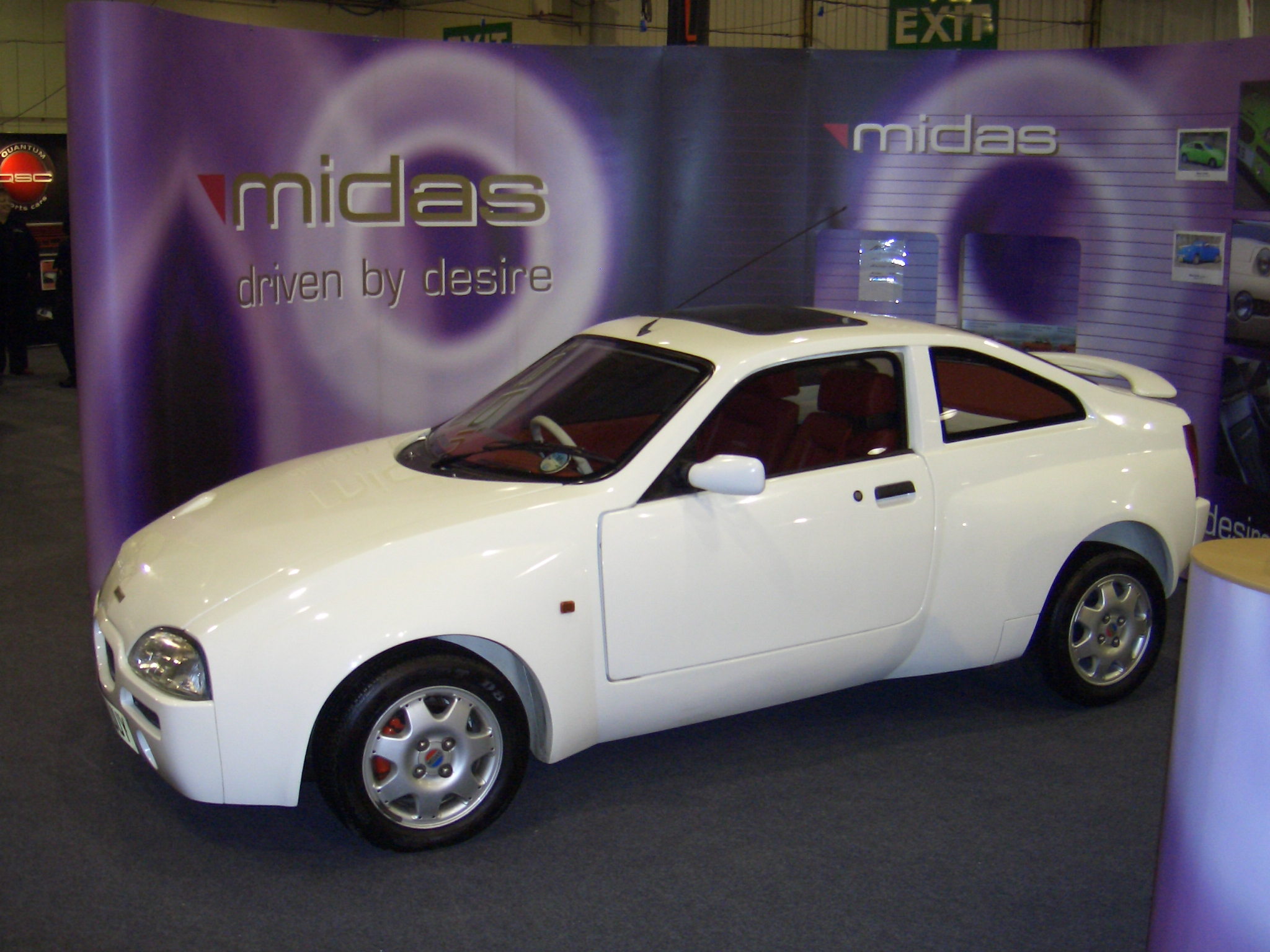
Midas Cortez 1995–present

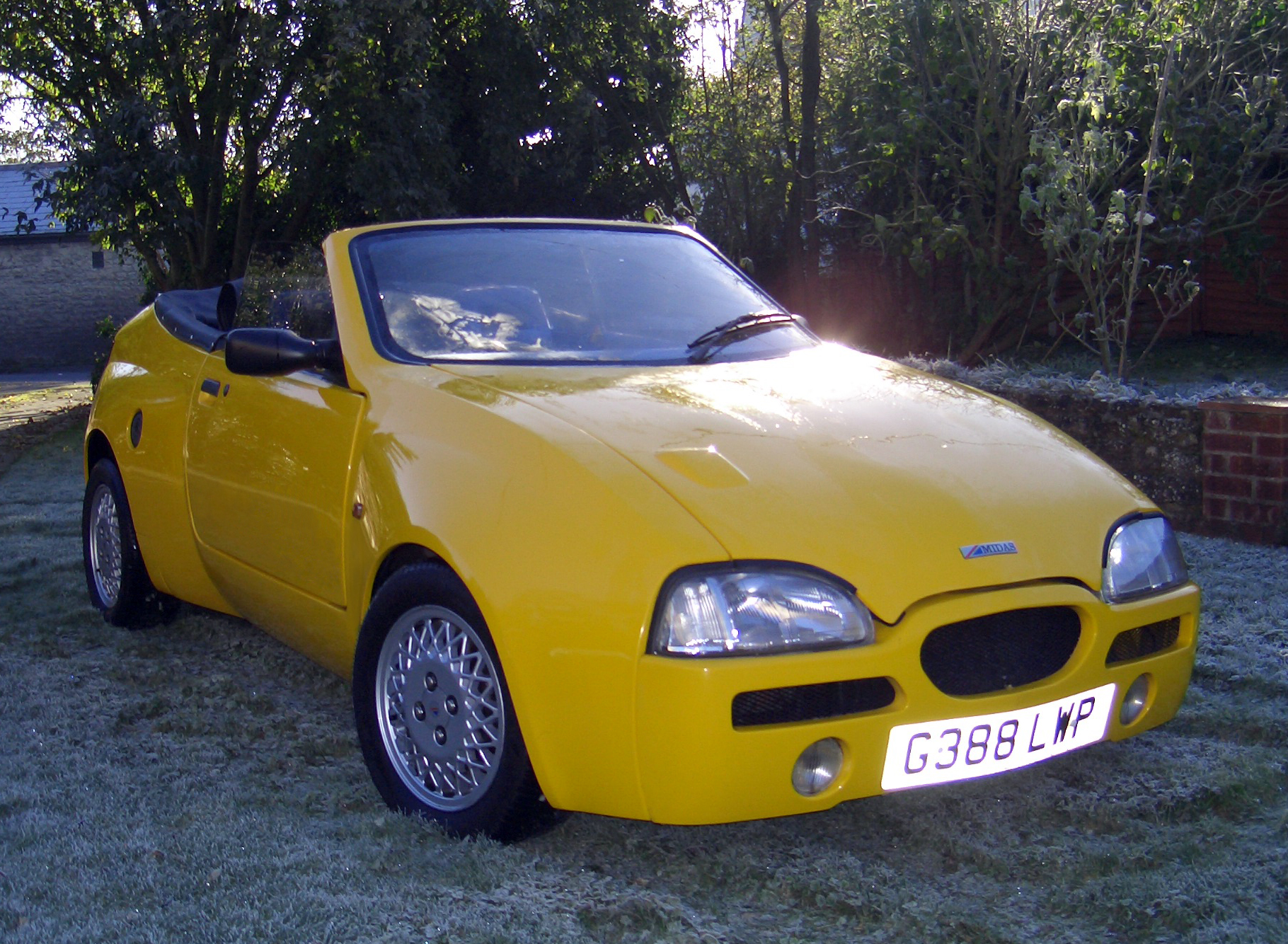
Midas Excelsior 2002–present
