= Claude Ballot-Léna =

French racing driver

- Ballot-Léna c. 1988
- Born: Claude Roger Léon Ballot-Léna; 4 August 1936; Paris, France
- Died: 5 December 1999 (aged 63); Paris, France
- Cause of death: Cancer
- Awards: 1969 Spa 24 Hours winner 1983 24 Hours of Daytona winner

NASCAR Cup Series career
- 6 races run over 2 years
- First race: 1978 Daytona 500 (Daytona)
- Last race: 1979 Firecracker 400 (Daytona)
Wins	Top tens	Poles
0	0	0

Claude Roger Léon Ballot-Léna (4 August 1936 – 5 December 1999) was a French racing driver born in Paris.

== Career ==
Ballot-Léna won the 1969 Spa 24 Hours in a Porsche 911 and the 1983 24 Hours of Daytona in a Porsche 935 Turbo owned by Preston Henn. He also entered the 24 Hours of Le Mans many times from 1966 until the 1980s and other than record holder Tom Kristensen has scored the most class victories at Le Mans with seven wins driving Porsche, Ferrari and Jaguar GT class cars. Ballot-Léna was also one of the earliest European NASCAR drivers when he made six Winston Cup starts in 1978 to 1979 at Talladega Superspeedway, Daytona International Speedway, and Atlanta Motor Speedway.

Ballot-Léna died on 5 December 1999 in Paris from cancer.

== Motorsports career results ==
=== 24 Hours of Le Mans results ===
24 Hours of Le Mans results
Year	Team	Co-Drivers	Car	Class	Laps	Pos.	Class Pos.
1965	Abarth France	(France) Frank Ruata	Abarth 1000 SP	P 1.15	-	DNQ	DNQ
1966	(France) Jean-Louis Marnat & Cie	(France) Jean-Louis Marnat	Marcos Mini Marcos GT 2+2-BMC	P 1.3	258	15th	5th
1967	(France) S.E.C. Automobiles CD	(France) Dennis Dayan	CD SP66C-Peugeot	P 1.15	25	DNF	DNF
1968	(France) Auguste Veuillet	(France) Guy Chasseuil	Porsche 911T	GT; 2.0	224	DNF	DNF
1969	(France) Auguste Veuillet	(France) Guy Chasseuil	Porsche 911T	GT; 2.0	301	11th	**2nd**
1970	(France) Établissement Sonauto	(France) Guy Chasseuil	Porsche 914/6 GT	GT; 2.0	285	6th	**1st**
1971	(France) Auguste Veuillet - Sonauto	(France) Guy Chasseuil	Porsche 908/2	P 3.0		DNF	DNF
1972	(France) Charles Pozzi	(France) Jean-Claude Andruet	Ferrari 365 GTB/4	GT; 5.0	306	5th	**1st**
1973	(France) Automobiles Charles Pozzi	(United Kingdom) Vic Elford	Ferrari 365 GTB/4	GT; 5.0	316	6th	**1st**
1974	(France) Robert Buchet	(United Kingdom) Vic Elford	Porsche 911 Carrera RSR	GT		DNF	DNF
1975	(France) Écurie Robert Buchet	(Canada) Jacques Bienvenue	Porsche 911 Carrera RSR	GT	304	8th	4th
1976	(France) Ecurie T.S.	(France) Guy Chasseuil	WM P76-Peugeot	GTP		DNF	DNF
1977	(France) JMS Racing / ASA Cachia	(United States) Peter Gregg	Porsche 935	Gr. 5	315	**3rd**	**1st**
1978	(France) Pozzi-Thompson JMS Racing	(France) Jean-Louis Lafosse	Ferrari 512BB	IMSA +2.5	218	DNF	DNF
1979	(France) JMS Racing / Charles Pozzi	(France) Michel Leclère (United States) Peter Gregg	Ferrari 512BB/LM	IMSA +2.5	219	DNF	DNF
1980	(France) Ch. Pozzi - JMS Racing	(France) Jean-Claude Andruet	Ferrari 512BB/LM	IMSA	129	DNF	DNF
1981	(France) Charles Pozzi S.A.	(France) Jean-Claude Andruet (Belgium) Hervé Regout	Ferrari 512BB/LM	IMSA; GTX	328	5th	**1st**
1982	Charles Pozzi - Ferrari France	(France) Jean-Claude Andruet	Ferrari 512BB/LM	IMSA; GTX	57	DNF	DNF
1983	(United States) Preston Henn T-Bird Swap Shop (United Kingdom) John Fitzpatrick Racing	(United States) Preston Henn (France) Jean-Louis Schlesser	Porsche 956	C	327	10th	10th
1984	(United States) Group 44 Jaguar	(United States) Tony Adamowicz (United Kingdom) John Watson	Jaguar XJR-5	IMSA; GTP	212	DNF	DNF
1985	(United States) Group 44 Jaguar	(United States) Bob Tullius (United States) Chip Robinson	Jaguar XJR-5	GTP	324	13th	**1st**
1986	(Germany) Porsche AG	(France) René Metge	Porsche 961	GTX	321	7th	**1st**
1988	(United Kingdom) Chamberlain Engineering	(France) Jean-Louis Ricci (France) Jean-Claude Andruet	Spice SE88C-Ford Cosworth	C2	17	DNF	DNF
1989	(Germany) Joest Racing	(France) Henri Pescarolo (France) Jean-Louis Ricci	Porsche 962C	C1	371	6th	6th

=== NASCAR ===
(key) (Bold – Pole position awarded by qualifying time. Italics – Pole position earned by points standings or practice time. * – Most laps led.)

==== Winston Cup Series ====
NASCAR Winston Cup Series results
Year	Team	No.	Make	1	2	3	4	5	6	7	8	9	10	11	12	13	14	15	16	17	18	19	20	21	22	23	24	25	26	27	28	29	30	31	NWCC	Pts	Ref
1978	GC Spencer Racing	49	Dodge	RSD	DAY; 22	RCH	CAR	ATL	BRI	DAR	NWS	MAR	TAL; 18	DOV	CLT	NSV	RSD	MCH	DAY; 35	NSV	POC	TAL; 37	MCH	BRI	DAR	RCH	DOV	MAR	NWS	CLT	CAR	ATL	ONT		NA	0	
1979	GC Spencer Racing	6	Olds	RSD	DAY; DNQ	CAR	RCH	ATL; 27	NWS	BRI	DAR	MAR	TAL	NSV	DOV	CLT	TWS	RSD	MCH	DAY; 31	NSV	POC	TAL	MCH	BRI	DAR	RCH	DOV	MAR	CLT	NWS	CAR	ATL	ONT	NA	0	

===== Daytona 500 =====
Year	Team	Manufacturer	Start	Finish
1978	GC Spencer Racing	Dodge	35	22
1979	GC Spencer Racing	Oldsmobile	DNQ	
