= Marnat =

Marnat is a French surname. Notable people with the surname include:

- Jean-Louis Marnat (1935–1985), French rally and race driver
- Marcel Marnat (1933–2024), French musicologist, journalist, and radio producer
