= GTM K3 =

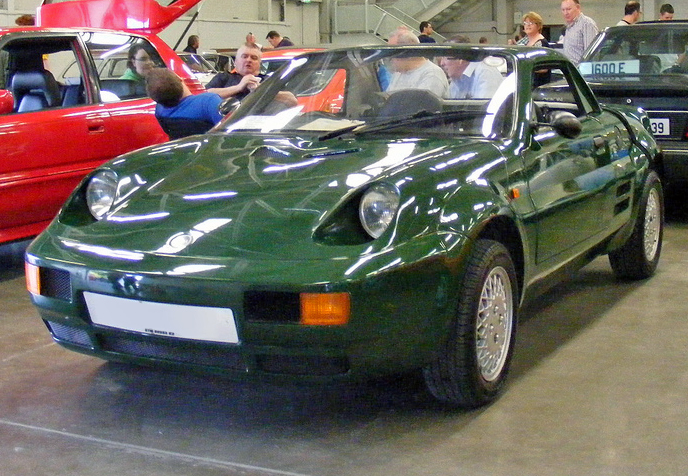

Overview
- Manufacturer: GTM Cars

Body and chassis
- Body style: 2-door coupé 2-door convertible

Powertrain
- Engine: 1,118-1,800 cc Rover K-series I4
- Transmission: 5-speed manual

Dimensions
- Wheelbase: 91 in (2,311 mm)
- Length: 150 in (3,810 mm)
- Width: 61 in (1,549 mm)
- Height: 43 in (1,092 mm)
- Curb weight: 820 kg

The GTM K3 or Rossa K3 is a Metro-based 2 kit car by GTM Cars

The car was based on two front Rover Metro subframes, with the steering being locked on the rear subframe, these were fitted to a fibreglass monocoque tub. Coupé or convertible bodywork could be specified.
