= GTM Coupé =

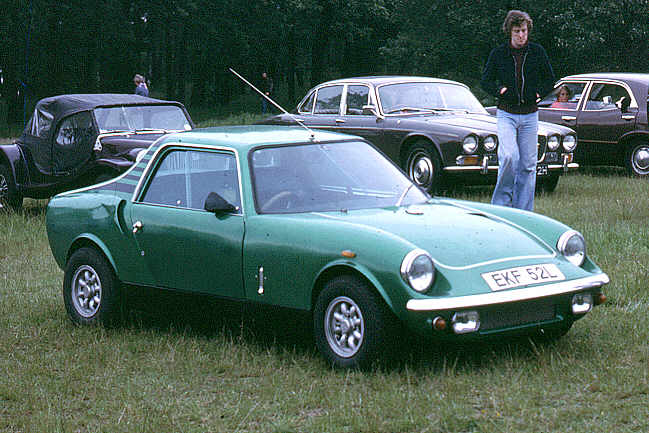
- 1978 GTM (variation 4)

Overview
- Manufacturer: Cox Brothers (1967-1968); Howard Heerey/Midland Garage (1969-1972); GTM Engineering/GTM Cars (1980-1995); Primo Designs (1996-2001)
- Also called: Cox GTM; GTM; Primo Coupé
- Production: 1967–2001; ~800 built

Body and chassis
- Class: Sports car
- Body style: 2-door coupe
- Layout: Rear mid-engine, rear-wheel drive
- Related: Mini

Powertrain
- Engine: 848-1275 cc A-series I4 (Mini); 998-1275 cc A-Plus (Metro)

Dimensions
- Wheelbase: 84 in (2,100 mm)
- Length: 130 in (3,300 mm) (typical)
- Width: 59 in (1,500 mm) (typical)
- Height: 42 in (1,100 mm) (typical)
- Curb weight: 1,344 lb (610 kg) (road trim, typical)

The GTM Coupé is a Mini based kit car dating back to 1967. GTM is an initialism for "Grand Touring Mini". The car was first shown at the 1967 Racing Car Show and soon afterwards went into production by the Cox brothers from their garage in Hazel Grove, Stockport as the Cox GTM. In 1969 the rights to the design and manufacturing were bought by Howard Heerey and the Cox part of the name was dropped. Heerey's father's company, Midland Garage, took over manufacture of the GTM. In April 1980 ownership changed again to GTM Engineering, who upgraded and continued to manufacture the Coupé until 1995.

== Design ==
The Coupé is a mid-engined two-seater sports car designed to give outstanding performance for its time, and impeccable handling. The shape was inspired by the Ferrari Dino. The design is composed of two Mini front subframes, with traditional Mini rubber cone suspension, linked by a sheet steel semi-monocoque chassis. The chassis' deep centre tunnel backbone is supplemented by two generous sills. The car is mid-engined: the rear subframe contained the engine as in a Mini with the steering arms locked in position with adjustable rods and ball joints. This is held in place by a 1" square tubular space frame, all the way from the rear bulkhead. The front subframe carried the steering rack, fuel tank and radiator. Brakes and wheels remained as per the options available to the Mini, post April 1982 GTM Coupés being designed to allow fitment of 13" wheels. Mini or later Metro engines could be installed.

Cox himself only built fifty-five cars. Howard Heerey acquired the rights to the car and renamed it GTM, while his father's Midland Garage took over production. Heerey kept developing the car, reaching a third variant, referred to as 1–3, for "model 1, variation 3", by 1971, when about 170 kits had been manufactured. This third model used the Mini's front bumper (earlier models had none) and the taillights of the Triumph Dolomite. The rear subframe was changed from a sheetmetal to a lighter and easier to manufacture spaceframe design, which also freed up space for the radiator to be fitted next to the engine rather than up front. The company also changed names again, to Howard Heerey Engineering Ltd. By 1972, Heerey had to close up shop and sold the jigs and moulds to HE Glass-Fibre of Hartlewood. They remained dormant until 1976 when KMB Autosports began manufacturing spare parts again, but no new cars were built until the parts and jigs were sold in April 1980 after lengthy negotiations. GTM Engineering (later GTM Cars) built about 600 more Coupés in a number of iterations from 1980 until 1995, and updated the design in 1983. This was the fifth variation, which received a front-mounted Austin Allegro radiator to minimize earlier models perennial overheating problems. Peter Leslie's Primo Designs of Stoulton (Worcestershire) took over manufacture in 1996 and continued to build the design into the early 2000s, largely unchanged.

As built by GTM Cars, the Coupé was available in several groups of "part packs" that were designed to allow each stage of the build to be purchased separately as they were undertaken, spreading the costs over a period. In 1985 a complete kit cost £2380. "Labour packs" were also available for customers that wished GTM to undertake specific stages in the construction.

=== Chassis ===
The chassis is fabricated from 18 to 20 swg steel, to incorporate the floor pan, boxed sills and the central tunnel box section. It forms a very robust structure. The fabrication is carried forwards in order to locate the front sub-frame, and a 1" square tubular space frame extends beyond the rear bulkhead to carry the rear sub-frame. Welding was carried out by MIG for consistent quality and to avoid distortion. The chassis was fully jigged during manufacturing to ensure a true and accurate assembly.

=== Body ===
The body is moulded in high quality glass reinforced plastic. It is extremely tough, non rusting and, being unstressed, is not subject to gel-coat star crazing as found on many cars using GRP body shells. The windscreen is laminated glass and the rear screen perspex. The doors are double skinned glass fibre fitted with anti-burst locks, steel window frames, and steel strengthers to avoid door drop, often found on glass fibre cars. The sliding windows are toughened glass, coming from the Mini traveler.

The bonnet is again moulded in high quality glass reinforced plastic. It is hinged at the front to give access to under bonnet space. A completely separate boot compartment situated behind the engine offers 4 cu ft (0.11 m^{3}) of luggage space with separate locking boot cover.

== Re-Release ==
In 2015 Hambly Sportscars Ltd. purchased the Primo (ex-GTM) Coupé Project, and are now supplying spare parts. They were also developing a Ford Fiesta-engined version of the kit with a new rear subframe.

== Gallery ==
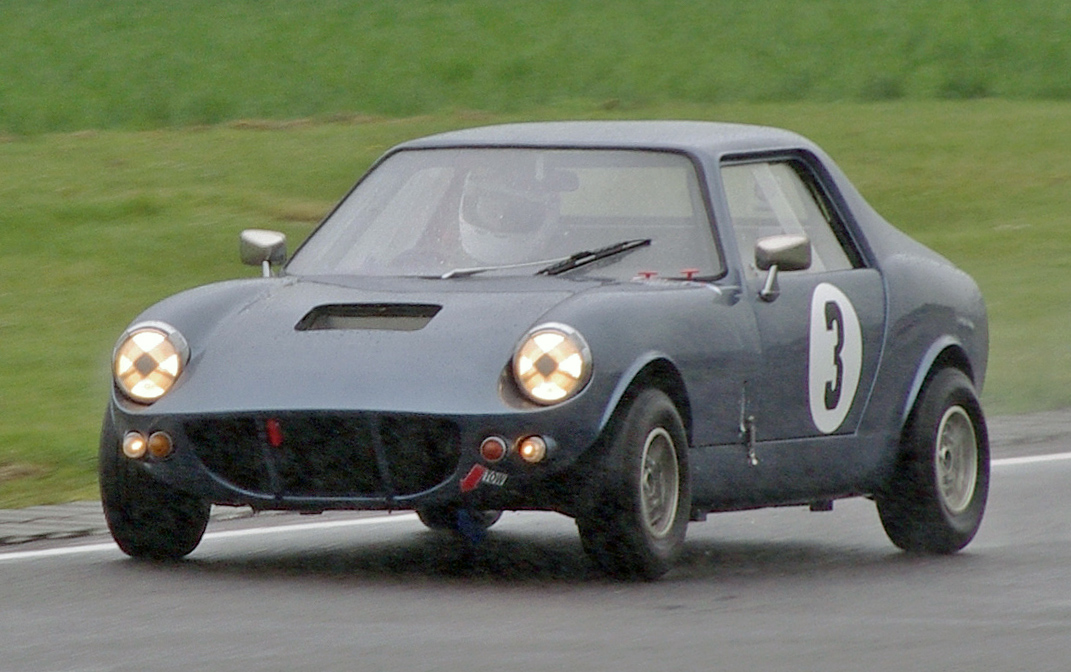
A 1969 Cox GTM being raced

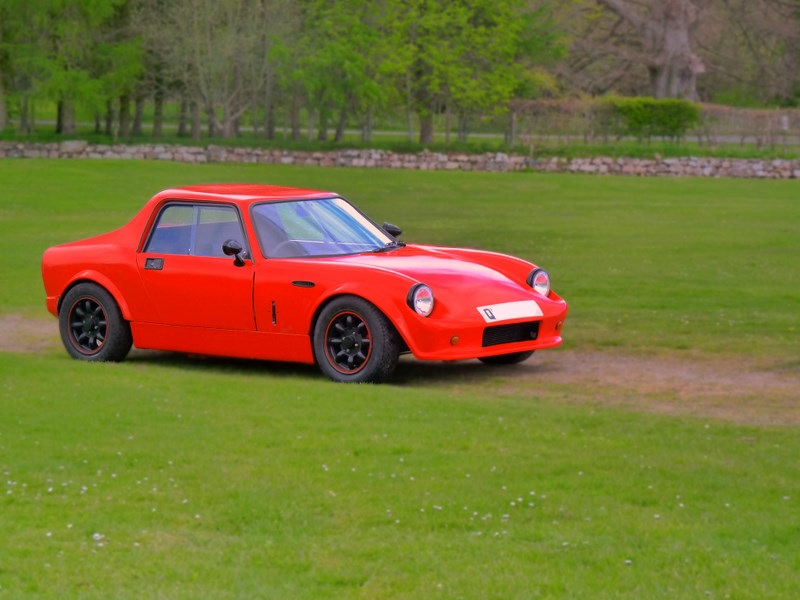
A 1985 GTM Coupé (model 1, variation 5)

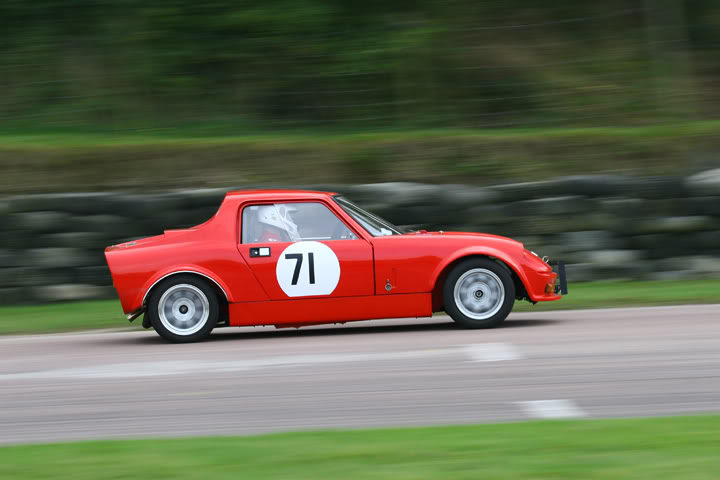
Honda Powered GTM Coupé at speed
