= GTM Libra =

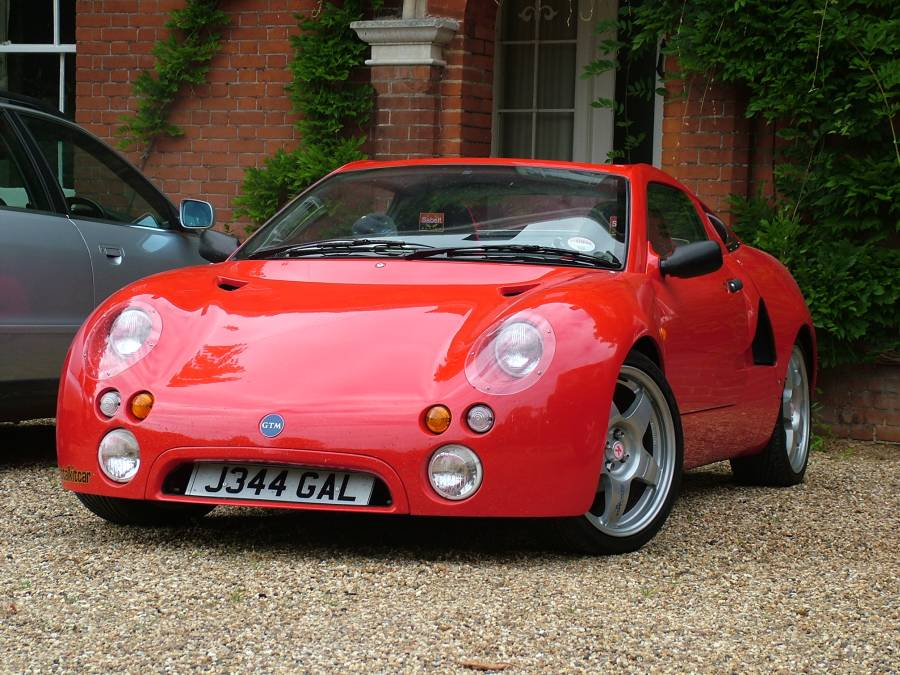
- 2003 GTM Libra

Overview
- Manufacturer: GTM Cars

Body and chassis
- Class: Kit car
- Layout: Rear mid-engine, rear-wheel-drive layout

Powertrain
- Engine: Rover K Series I4 and V6, Honda (various), Audi 1.8T

Dimensions
- Wheelbase: 2.32m
- Length: 3.56m
- Width: 1.65m
- Height: 1.15m
- Curb weight: 695kg

The Libra was launched by GTM Cars Ltd on the UK kitcar market in 1998. Three years in development it was a collaboration between GTM Cars directors Peter Beck & Paddy Fitch, designer Richard Oakes and suspension designer Bryn Davies.

Conceived as a lightweight sportscar, it uses no subframes for its suspension with all the mountings being bolted straight to the GRP monocoque tub. At the front it uses unequal length wishbones of GTM design locating uprights from the Rover Metro/100 range and a forward mounted steering rack for extra legroom. The rear suspension is an unusual double trailing arm design, bolted to the rear bulkhead and using the same uprights as the front. The engine/transmission unit is held in a frame hanging off the rear bulkhead, a frame which also locates the rear hinging engine cover which incorporates a sizeable boot which can accommodate a full size set of golf clubs. The front 'clamshell' conceals the radiator, battery, master cylinders etc. and also manages to stow a full size spare wheel (either 16" or 17"). A removable roof panel can be stowed behind the seats for an open top experience.

Initially launched with the 1.4 litre Rover 'K'-Series engine, the Libra has been fitted successfully with 1.6, 1.8, 1.8 VVC and KV6 2.5 litre Rover engines as well as the Toyota 2ZZ-GE, some Honda units and the Audi 1.8T turbo engine.
