= Mini Marcos =

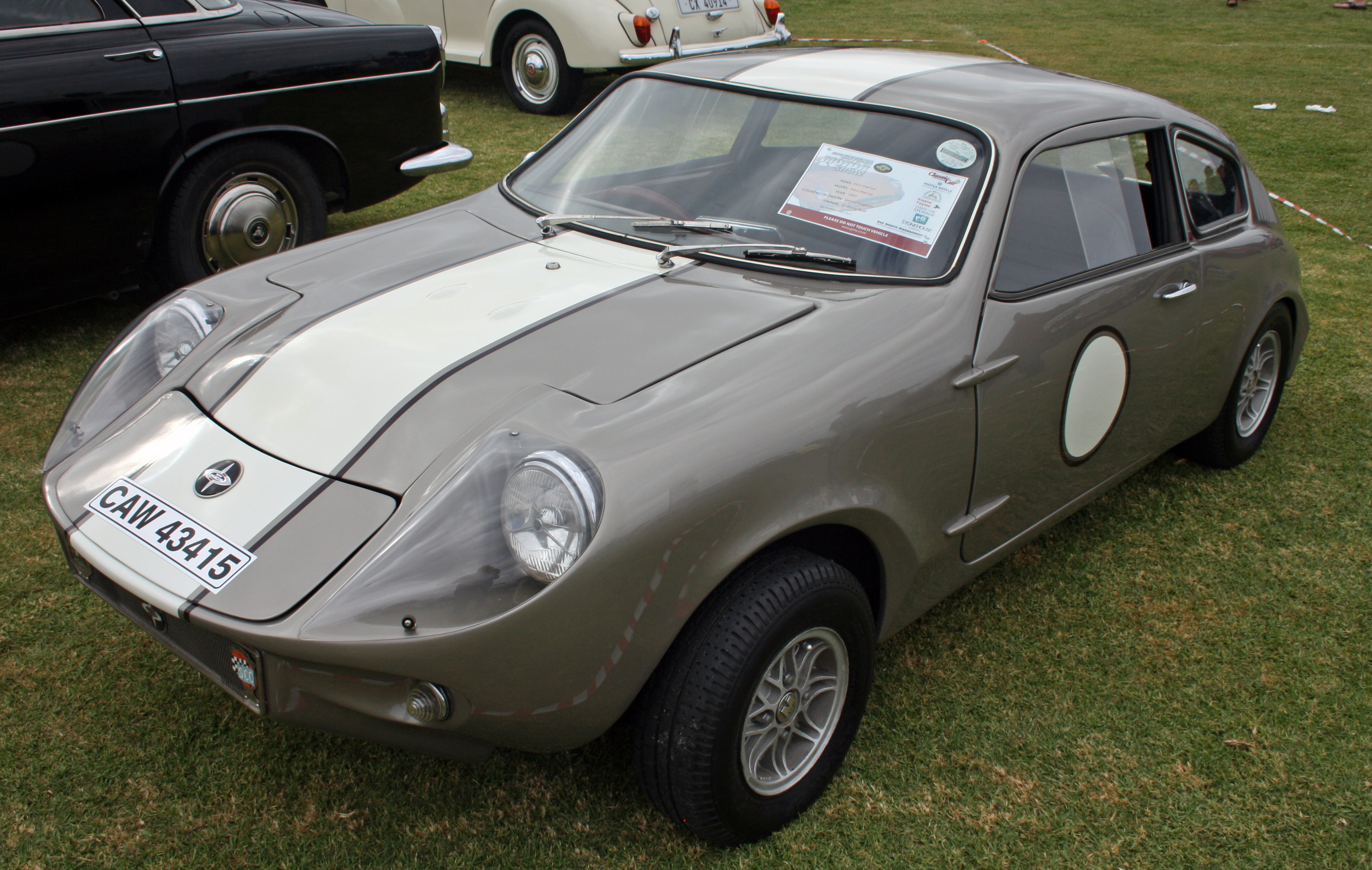
- 1965 Mini Marcos Mark I

Overview
- Manufacturer: Marcos (Mk 1 to Mk 5); D & H Fibreglass Techniques Ltd (Mk 4); Marcos Heritage Spares (Mk6)
- Production: 1965–96, 2005–current
- Designer: Malcolm Newell

Body and chassis
- Body style: 2-door coupé
- Related: Mini

Powertrain
- Engine: BMC A-series as fitted to Mini
- Transmission: 4-speed manual

Dimensions
- Wheelbase: 79 in (2,007 mm)
- Length: 136 in (3,454 mm)
- Width: 56 in (1,422 mm)
- Curb weight: 1,050 lb (476 kg)

Chronology
- Predecessor: DART
- Successor: Midas

The Mini Marcos is an automobile produced in limited numbers between 1965 and 1970 by Marcos, from 1974 to 1981 by D & H Fibreglass Techniques Limited and again between 1991 and 1996 by Marcos. It was based on the DART design by Dizzy Addicott who finally sold the project to Jeremy Delmar-Morgan. Jeremy marketed the Mini DART as the Mini Jem. Jem Marsh of Marcos cars separately developed the project into the Mk I Mini Marcos and despite the similarity of the name, had nothing to do with the Mini Jem. In Sweden the Mini Marcos was sold by Elmhorn-Troberg Racing Service.

== Development ==
The Marcos was sold as a kit car using a fibreglass/GRP Monocoque with running gear & subframes from a Mini. During its life it went through five versions with changes including sliding windows (Mark II), which also had a modified front number plate holder. An optional rear hatch appeared with the Mark III and a standard rear hatch and wind-up windows for the Mark IV which also received somewhat longer and taller bodywork.

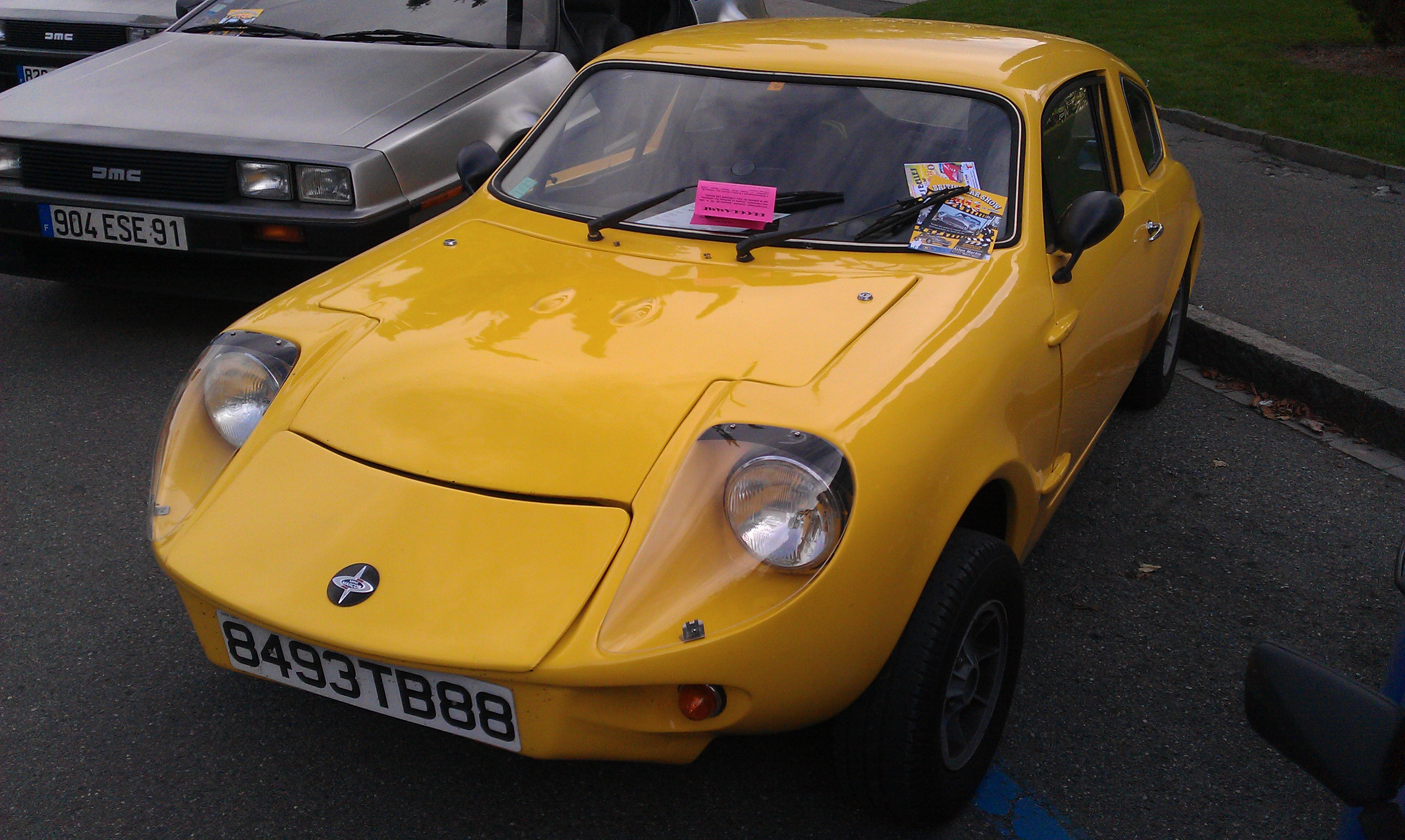
1974 Mini Marcos Mark IV, with wind-up windows

The Midas succeeded the Mk IV Mini Marcos which at that time was being made by D&H Fibreglass Techniques Limited in Oldham, but the latter marque was subsequently revived by Marcos with the Mark V.

Following the closure of the Marcos company, the Mini Marcos moulds were acquired by Rory McMath of Marcos Heritage Spares who has re-launched the car as the Heritage Mk. VI and GT, the latter being a racing version.

== Motorsport ==
The Mini Marcos was the only British car to finish (in 15th place) in the 1966 24 Hours of Le Mans: the drivers were Jean-Louis Marnat and Claude Ballot-Léna. The 1966 Le Mans car was used for several more races, then sold and finally stolen in Paris in October 1975. Many people searched for it, but it took until December 2016 to be found. Marcos entered a works car for the 24 Hours race of 1967 but the car fell out after just 13 laps.

It also set four British land speed class records. These are the flying mile, half mile, half kilometre and kilometre for cars up to 1600 cc.

== Australian production ==
There were a few copies of the Mini Jem/Marcos built in Australia. John Taylor of Taylorspeed, in Adelaide, introduced the Taylorspeed Jem at a local show in 1968. The car was only sold as a kit and was made to accept any Mini internals. Most were heavily modified by their builders, and no two are alike. All in all only ten were built of the Mark I (with an oval bottomed rear window) and Mark II series (with a square rear window), of which one was sold in Singapore.

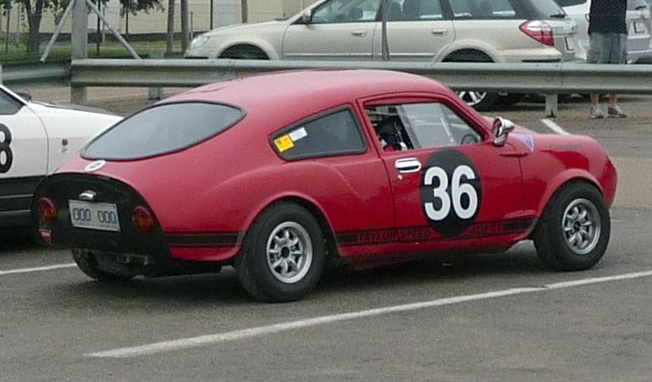
Taylorspeed Jem Mk. I
