= GTM Rossa =

Kit car designed and sold by GTM Cars

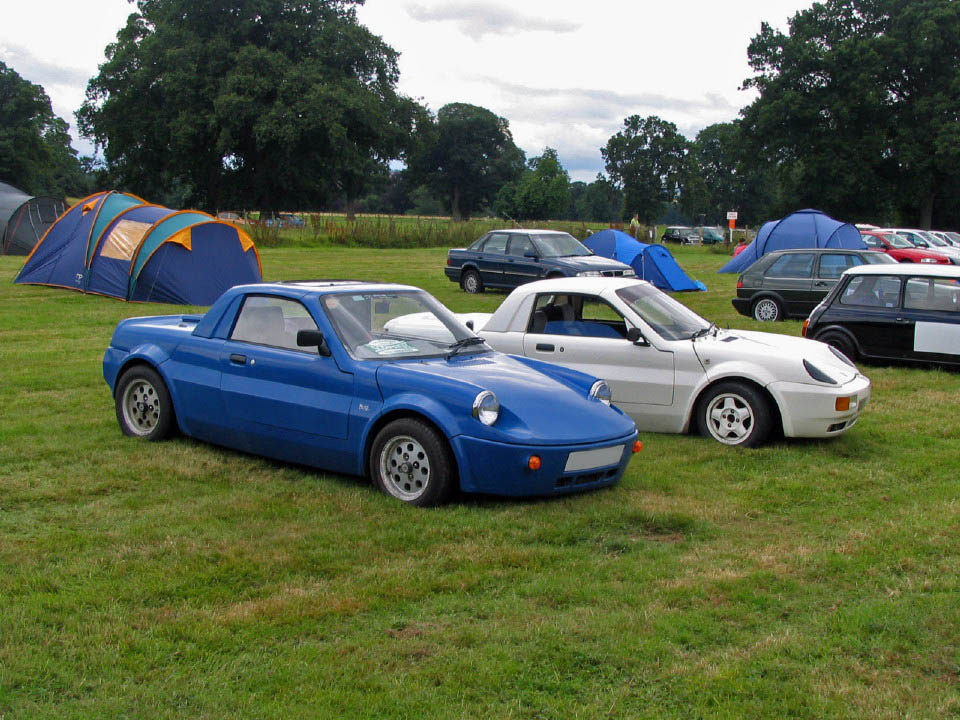
A GTM Rossa

The GTM Rossa is a Mini/Austin Metro based 2+2 kit car designed and sold by GTM Cars. It was styled by automotive designer Richard Oakes. The car was based on two front Mini subframes attached to a central fibreglass monocoque, with the steering being locked on the rear subframe. A galvanised steel frame supported the bulkhead. The hard top roof was removable and a soft top arrangement was available as an option from GTM.

Much was supplied to purchasers by GTM, but the new owners needed to source the engine, gearbox, steering rack, master cylinders, pedal assembly, heater, radiator, fuel tank, headlamps, steering column and stalk assembly, seats, wheels and windscreen themselves. Much came from the Mini, but the steering column and stalk assembly came from an Austin Allegro, the radiator from a Metro, the air vents from a Ford Escort and the windscreen, seats and wheels from a Citroen Visa.

The Mark 1 car was produced from 1987 to 1990, and the Mark 2 car (which received restyled front and rear clamshells and can be distinguished by the use a Peugeot 205 rear light clusters) was produced from the beginning of 1990.
