= GTM Cars =

British kit car manufacturer

GTM Cars Ltd.
- Type: Manufacturing Company
- Industry: Automotive
- Founded: 1967
- Founders: Bernard Cox; Jack Hosker
- Defunct: 2022
- Fate: Administration
- Headquarters: Kingswinford, England, UK
- Key people: Dr. Paul Faithfull - Managing Director
- Products: Libra, Spyder
- Owner: Potenza Sportscars Limited
- Website: gtmcars.com

GTM Cars was a component kit car manufacturer located in Kingswinford, UK.

== History ==
The company was founded in 1967 by Bernard Cox and his friend Jack Hosker, who created the Cox GTM (Grand Touring Mini), a mid-engined sports car built from Mini parts. It was an instant hit, and they built kits as fast as they could in their garage in Hazel Grove, Stockport. In the autumn of 1968, Bernard Cox decided to stop production after 50 kits.

Production was taken over by Howard Heerey, who had raced a GTM, and his father who renamed the car to simply GTM. The design evolved over time and by 1971 about 170 kits had been made and they were up to GTM 1-3 (model 1, variation 3). But in 1972 the road outside their garage had to be widened and they were forced to close.

In 1972 a fibreglass company in Hartlepool bought the demonstrator car, moulds, jigs and spares, but never produced any cars. Instead the GTM project was bought by KMB Autosports in 1976. They made spares for existing cars, but no new kits.

In 1980 GTM entered its most successful era by far when it was bought by Peter Beck, Paddy Fitch and Dougal Cowper, the latter departing relatively soon after. The company moved to Sutton Bonington in 1982 and over the next 20 years refined the GTM Coupé, as it became known, and developed a succession of new models. The Rossa was another Mini based car with more modern styling, and was followed by the Mk2. With the introduction of the Rover 'K'-series engine, GTM were quick to fit one in their third generation Rossa which was launched as simply the 'K3', the first vehicle to be made available with a mid-mounted 'K'-series (subsequently followed by Lotus' Elise, MG's own MGF and Ariel's Atom to name but three).

In 1998, following three years in development, Beck and Fitch launched a more up-market sports model, the Richard Oakes designed Libra. This was followed up four years later with the Spyder, a more softly styled convertible bearing some of the same styling cues as the Libra but sharing few panels.

In 2003 GTM Cars was bought by RDM Group, and in 2004 the company moved to Coventry. Under RDM's management, GTM developed two new cars: the Ballista, a minor reworking of the Larini Volkswagen Golf Mk2-based kit car, and a 'skeletal' track car — the 40TR — based on the fibreglass monocoque tub of the Spyder. Neither car progressed past the development stage. GTM continued to focus on the Libra and Spyder, selling them in either kit or complete factory built forms.

In December 2007 GTM Cars Ltd. came under the ownership of new parent company Potenza Sports Cars, owners of Westfield Sportscars.

January 2008 saw GTM Cars appear at the Autosport Show with a newly redeveloped 40TR, although 40TR development had been postponed in favour of development on the Ballista project.

GTM Cars again featured on the Westfield/Potenza stand at the National Kitcar Show at Stoneleigh in Warwickshire on the May Bank Holiday weekend 2009 in the shape of a red Spyder. For sale as an ex-demonstrator, the car was unpolished and even showed a fair amount of road debris, a far cry from some of the stunning cars shown by the company in previous years. However, Potenza also made clear that the cars would be rebranded as Westfield GTM rather than as a marque in its own right.

In late January 2010, Westfield Sportscars made the following announcement: "Unfortunately due to parts procurement issues we are no longer offering the current range of GTM models. We will however over the next 12 months be designing and manufacturing a new GTM."

== Gallery ==
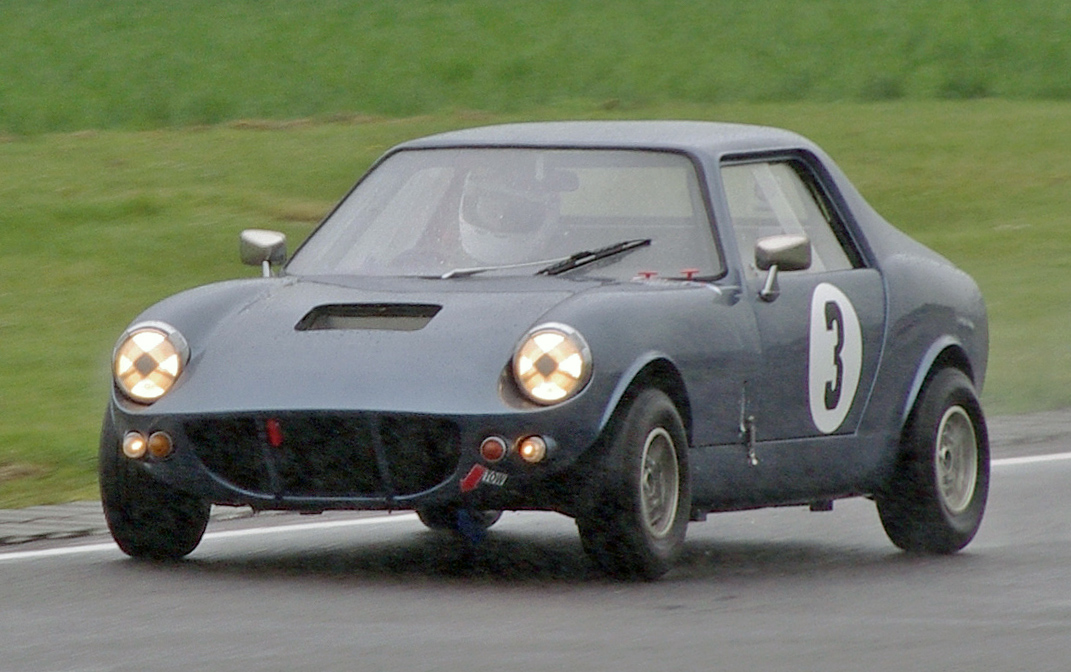
1969 Cox GTM Coupé

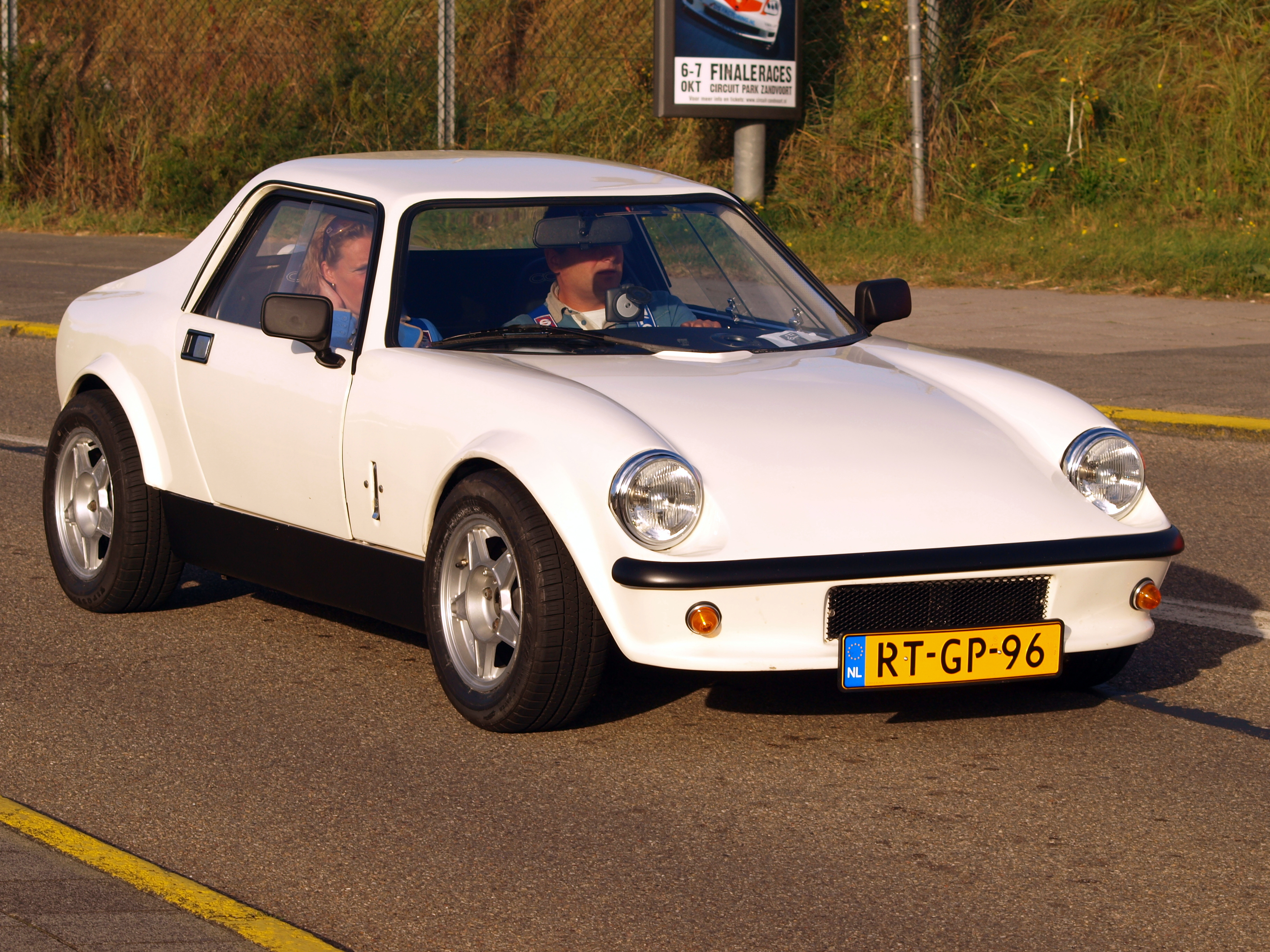
1982 GTM Coupé

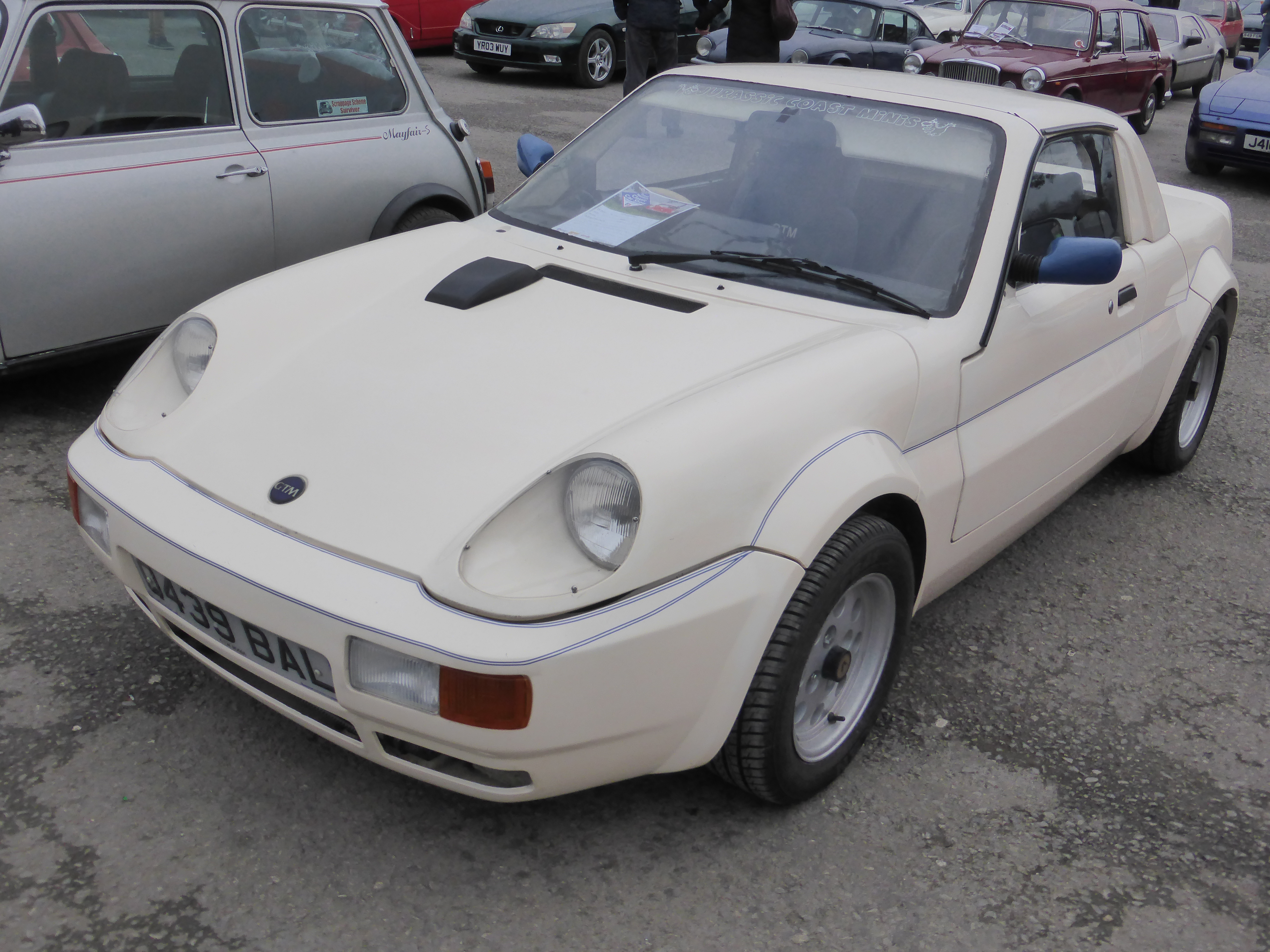
1989 GTM Rossa

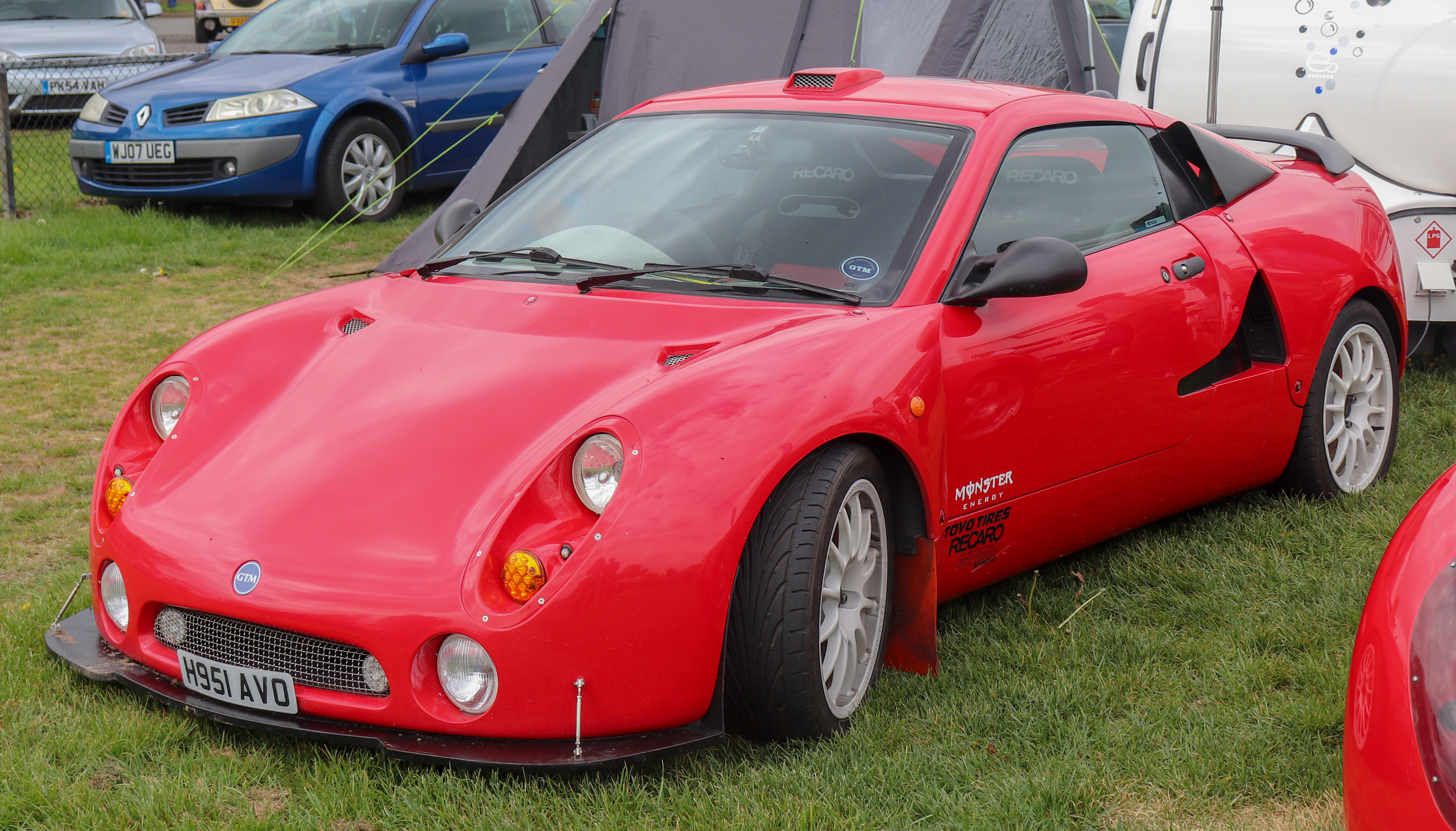
1991 GTM Libra

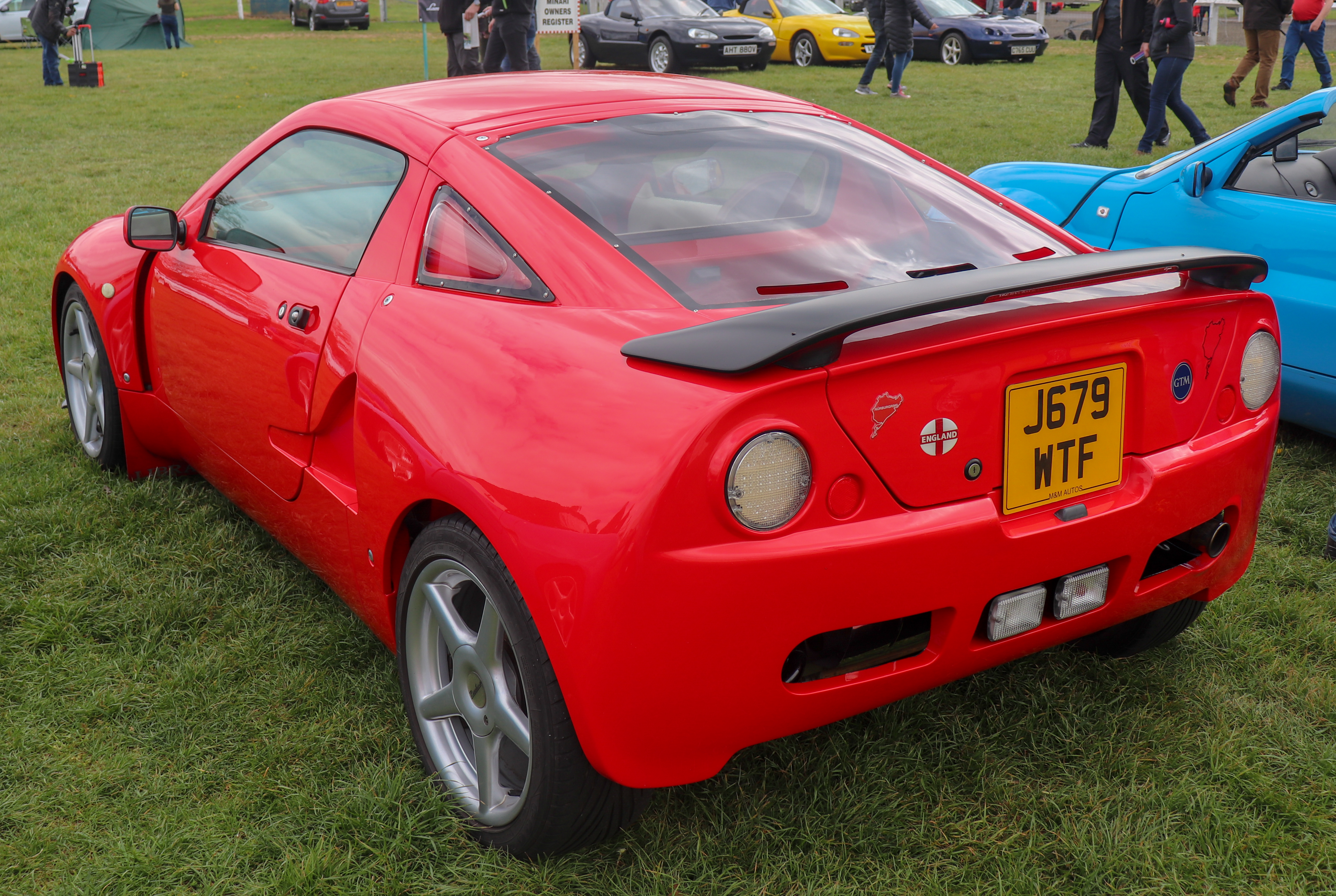
1992 GTM Libra rear

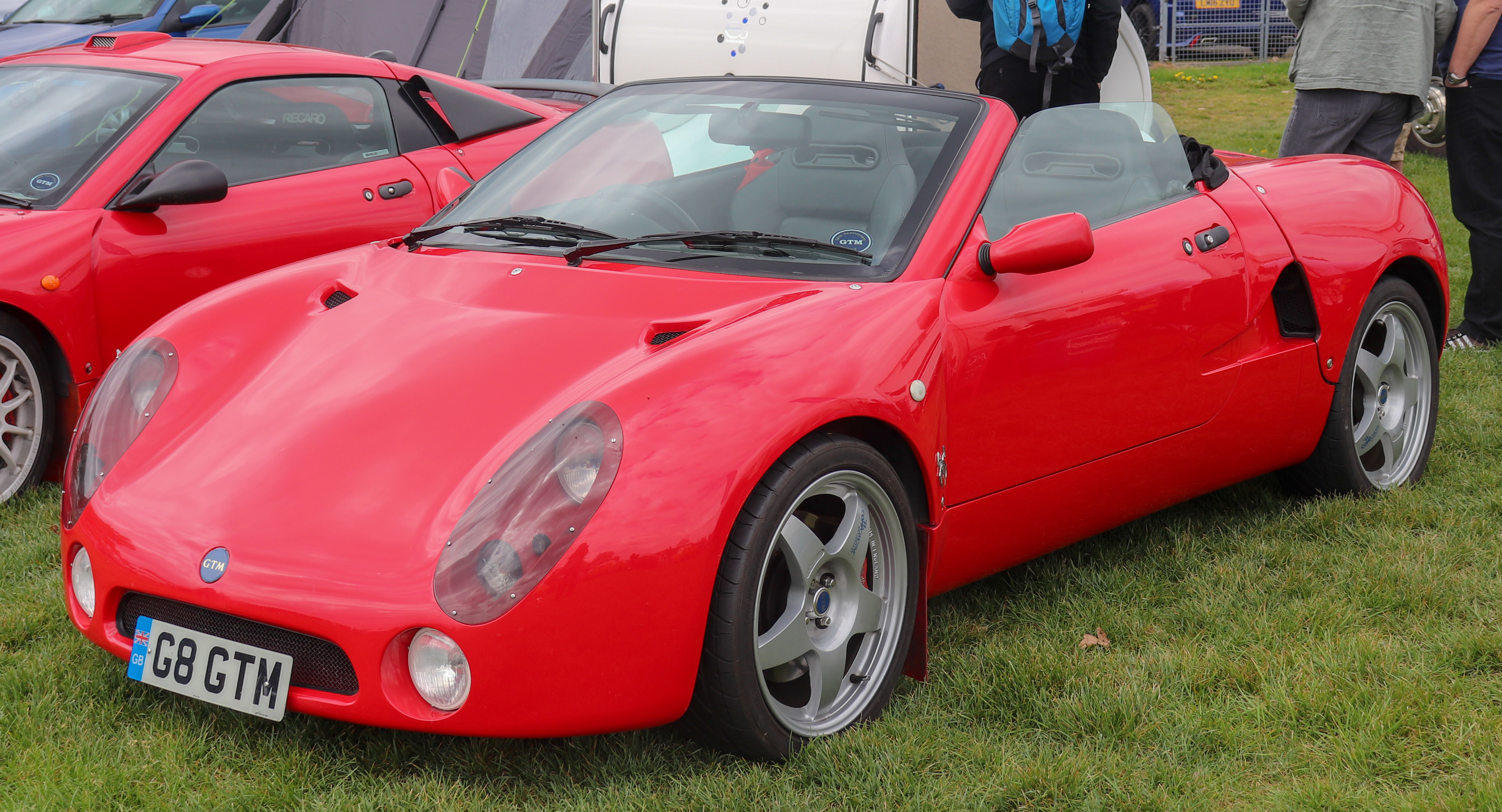
2007 GTM Spyder
