= Jean-Louis Marnat =

Jean-Louis Marnat (7 August 1935 – 15 July 1985) was a French rally and race driver.

== Driver career ==
He started his career in 6 hours of Saint-Cloud, near Paris, and won the Tourism category with a Renault Dauphine Gordini in 1959.

For a couple of years he used to drive a Mini Cooper S in national rallies.

In 1964, 1966 and 1968, he participated to 24 Hours of Le Mans with a Triumph Spitfire, a Mini Marcos and an Alpine A210. He achieved 15th place in 1966

He also competed in Tour de France, 1000 km of Paris and 1000 km of Monza races, on Linas-Montlhéry, Magny-Cours, Nogaro, Reims and Zolder circuits.

== Biography ==
After graduating from French engineer school (Ecole technique de constructions aéronautiques et de construction automobile, ESTACA today), he had opened shops for additional equipments for Minis.

He died on 15 July 1985 in a road accident in the French department of Yonne where he came from.
