= Rover L-series engine =

Rover L series
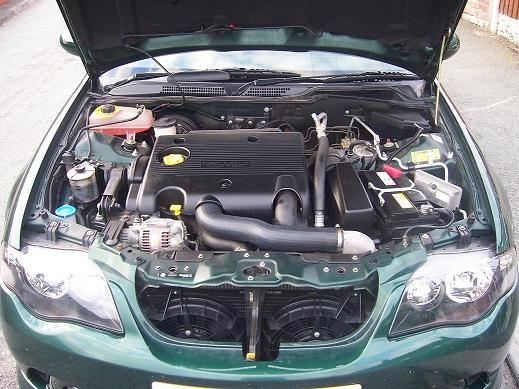

Overview
- Manufacturer: Rover Group; MG Rover Group/Powertrain Ltd
- Production: 1994–2005

Layout
- Configuration: Straight-4
- Displacement: 2.0 L (1,994 cc; 121.7 cu in)
- Cylinder bore: 84.5 mm (3.33 in)
- Piston stroke: 88.9 mm (3.50 in)
- Cylinder block material: Cast iron
- Cylinder head material: Aluminum alloy
- Valvetrain: SOHC 2 valves x cyl.
- Compression ratio: 19.5:1

Combustion
- Turbocharger: With intercooler (in some versions)
- Fuel system: Mechanical FI; Electronic FI; Common rail direct injection
- Management: Bosch or Lucas
- Fuel type: Diesel
- Cooling system: Water-cooled

Output
- Power output: 84–114 bhp (63–85 kW)
- Torque output: 210–260 N⋅m (155–192 lb⋅ft)

Emissions
- Emissions control systems: EGR; Oxidation catalyst

Chronology
- Predecessor: Perkins Prima Diesel
- Successor: Rover G series

The Rover L-series engine is an automotive diesel engine built by Powertrain Ltd, a sister company of MG Rover.

== History ==
The Rover L-series engine entered production on 28 November 1994 and was Rover's first in-house designed and manufactured direct injection diesel engine for passenger car applications. The 2.0-litre, four-cylinder, turbocharged unit incorporated electronically controlled fuel injection and was developed to improve efficiency, refinement and emissions performance compared with earlier Perkins-derived Rover MDi/Prima diesel engines used in models such as the Austin Montego and Austin Maestro. It was also fitted in multiple Rover models and the Land Rover Freelander, as documented in the Haynes service manual.

The L-series engine shows up in stories about rare and historic cars, and some UK enthusiasts keep these vehicles, so the engine can still be found in classic car collections.

Contemporary reporting listed output figures of approximately 77 kW (103 bhp) at 4,200 rpm and 210 N⋅m (155 lb⋅ft) of torque at 2,000 rpm. Technical development details were presented in SAE Technical Paper 980175.

Initial production took place at Longbridge for installation in the Rover 600. The engine was subsequently fitted to the Rover 200 (Mk3), Rover 400 (Mk2), Rover 600 and the Land Rover Freelander.

== Development ==
The L-series programme formed part of Rover's mid-1990s strategy to introduce direct-injection diesel technology across its passenger car range. Contemporary technical publications describe the project as a transition from earlier indirect-injection designs toward improved performance and emissions characteristics.

== See also ==
- Rover G series
- Land Rover engines
- Rover 200 / 25
- Rover 400 / 45
- Rover 600 Series
- Land Rover Freelander
