= ICML Rhino =

Overview
- Manufacturer: ICML Motors
- Also called: International Rhino
- Production: 2006–2015

Body and chassis
- Class: Compact SUV
- Body style: 4-door SUV
- Layout: Four-wheel drive

Powertrain
- Engine: 2.0 L diesel I4
- Power output: 75 kW (101 hp)
- Transmission: 5-speed manual

Dimensions
- Wheelbase: 2,541 mm (100.0 in)
- Length: 4,400 mm (173.2 in)
- Width: 1,645 mm (64.8 in)
- Height: 1,885 mm (74.2 in)
- Curb weight: 1,603 kg (3,534 lb)

The ICML Rhino is a compact SUV produced by the Indian manufacturer ICML Motors. It is powered by a 2.0 L diesel engine. Production ended in 2015.
