= Rover 400 / 45 =

Rover 400 Series Rover 45
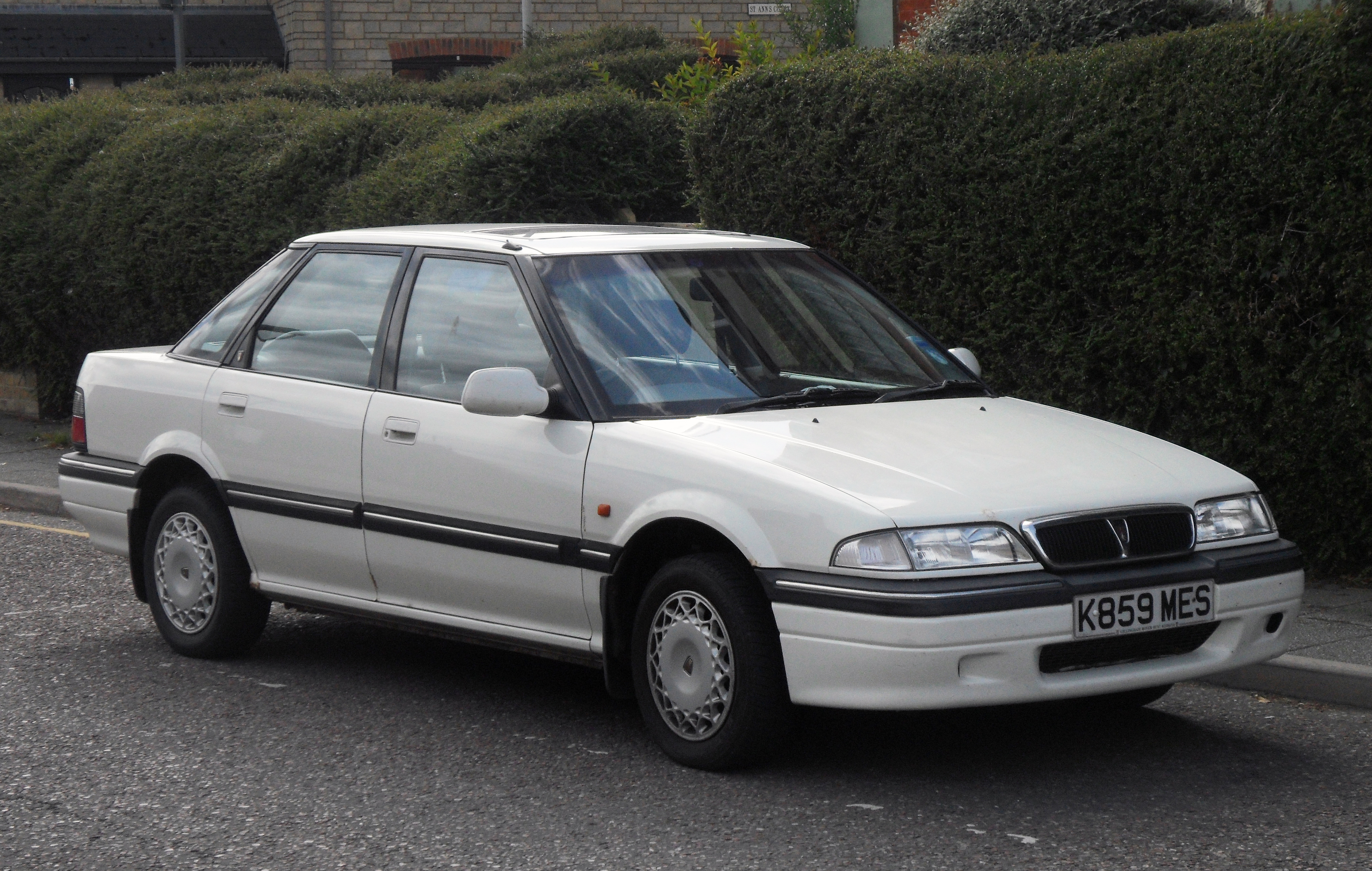
- 1993 Rover 414 SLi (first generation)

Overview
- Manufacturer: Rover
- Production: 1990–2005
- Assembly: United Kingdom: Longbridge, Birmingham (Longbridge plant)
- Designer: Peter Stevens

Body and chassis
- Class: Small family car
- Layout: Front-engine, front-wheel-drive

Chronology
- Predecessor: Rover 200 MkI (for R8); Rover 200 MkII (for HH-R); Austin Montego (for the saloon and estate/tourer); Austin Maestro (for hatchback)
- Successor: MG 6

The Rover 400 Series, and later the Rover 45, are a series of small family cars that were produced by the British manufacturer Rover from 1990 to 2005. The cars were co-developed as part of Rover's collaboration with Honda. The first-generation 400 was based on the Honda Concerto, and the Mark II 400 (later the Rover 45) was based on the Honda Domani/Civic.

Honda petrol engines were used in some Rover models, while the market competitive Rover L-series diesel engine was used from the mid-1990s in Hondas, before they designed their own diesel engine.

== Rover 400 (R8; 1990–1998) ==
Rover 400 (R8)
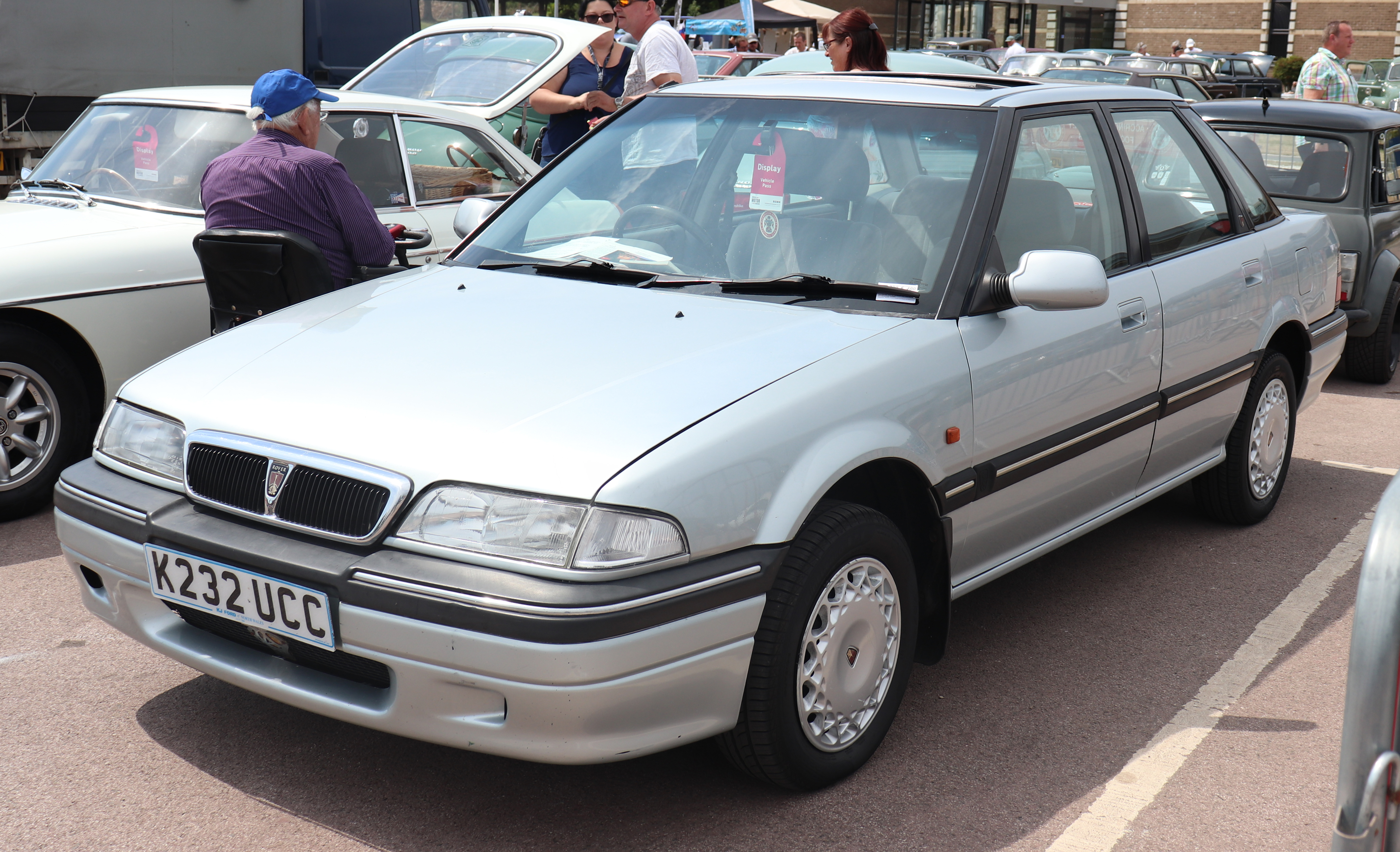
- 1993 Rover 416 GSi

Overview
- Production: 1990–1995 (saloon); 1994–1998 (Tourer)

Body and chassis
- Body style: 4-door saloon 5-door Tourer (estate)
- Related: Honda Concerto; Rover 200 (R8)

Powertrain
- Engine: petrol: 1.4 L K-series I4; 1.6 L Honda D16 I4; 2.0 L M-series I4; 2.0 L T-Series turbo I4; diesel: 1.8 L PSA XUD7T turbo I4; 1.9 L PSA XUD9 I4

Dimensions
- Wheelbase: 2,550 mm (100.4 in)
- Length: 4,370 mm (172.0 in)
- Width: 1,680 mm (66.1 in)
- Height: 1,400 mm (55.1 in)

The original 400 Series, launched in 1990 as a four-door saloon, was a saloon version of the second-generation Rover 200 Series hatchback, both sharing the codename R8 during development. The 200 Series had been launched six months earlier. Like the 200, the model was designed in collaboration with Honda (who produced the corresponding designed for Europe Concerto model) and both models would share production lines at Rover's Longbridge facility. It used the same core structure and mechanicals as the Honda, but the rear-end redesign of the glasshouse and body were unique to Rover. Interior trim and electrical architecture were all shared with the R8 Rover 200.

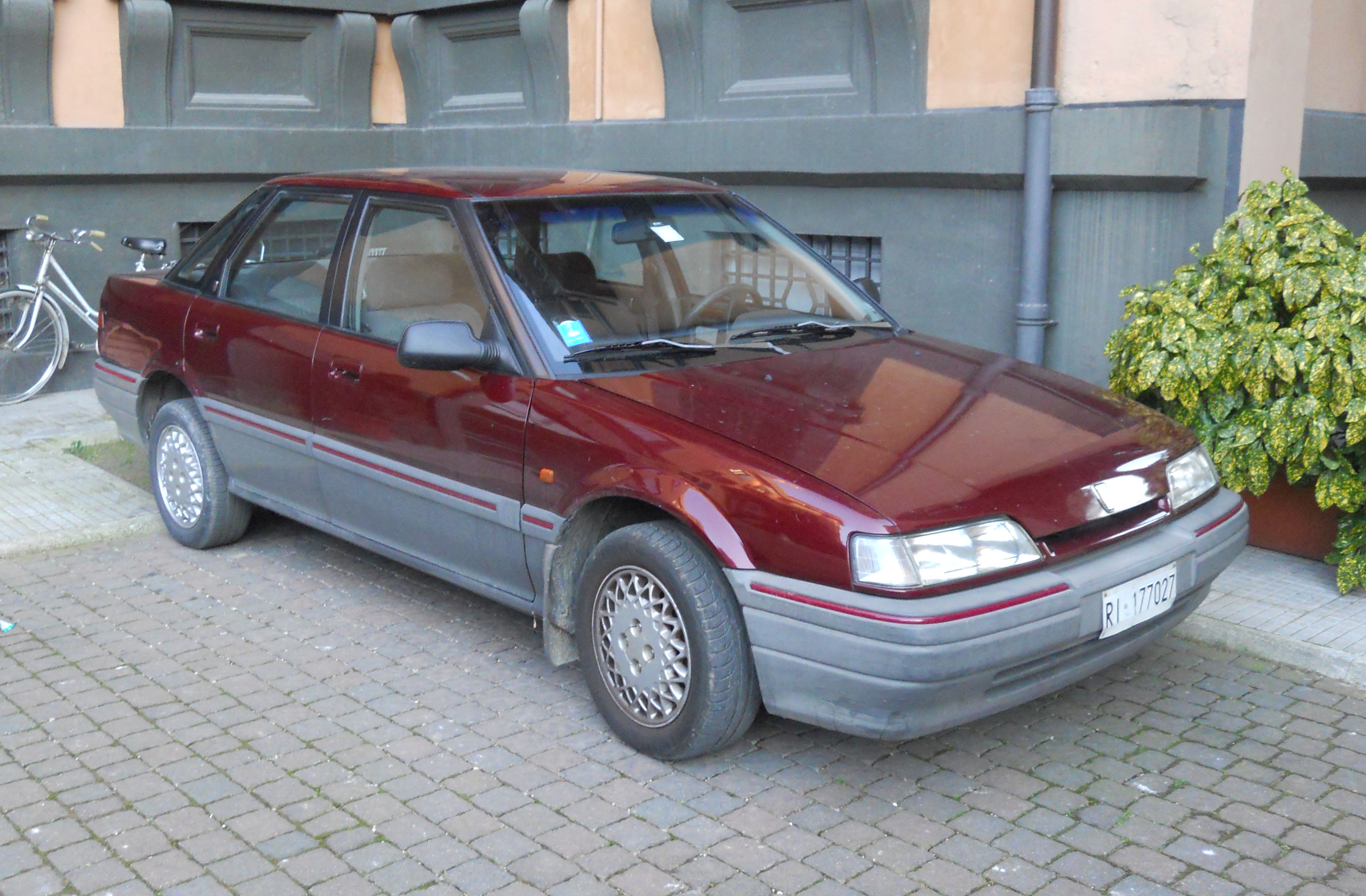
1992 Rover 416 GSi

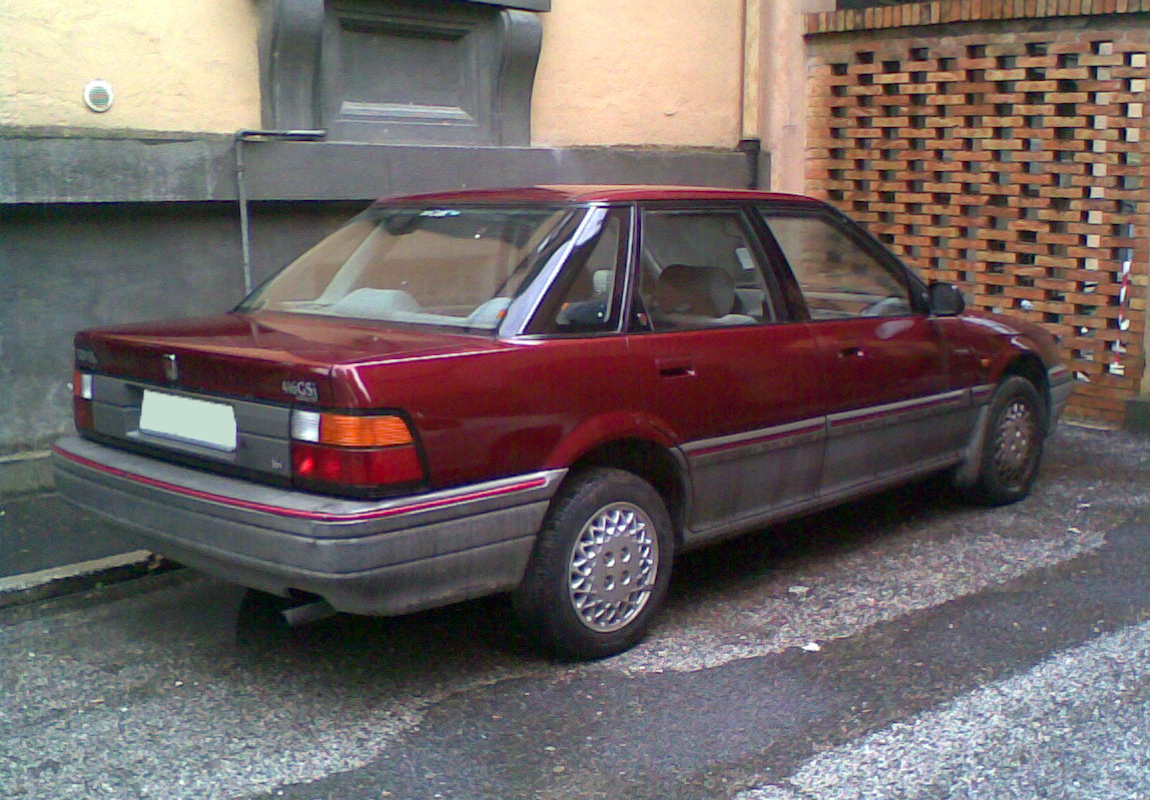
Rear of Rover 416 GSi 16v MK1

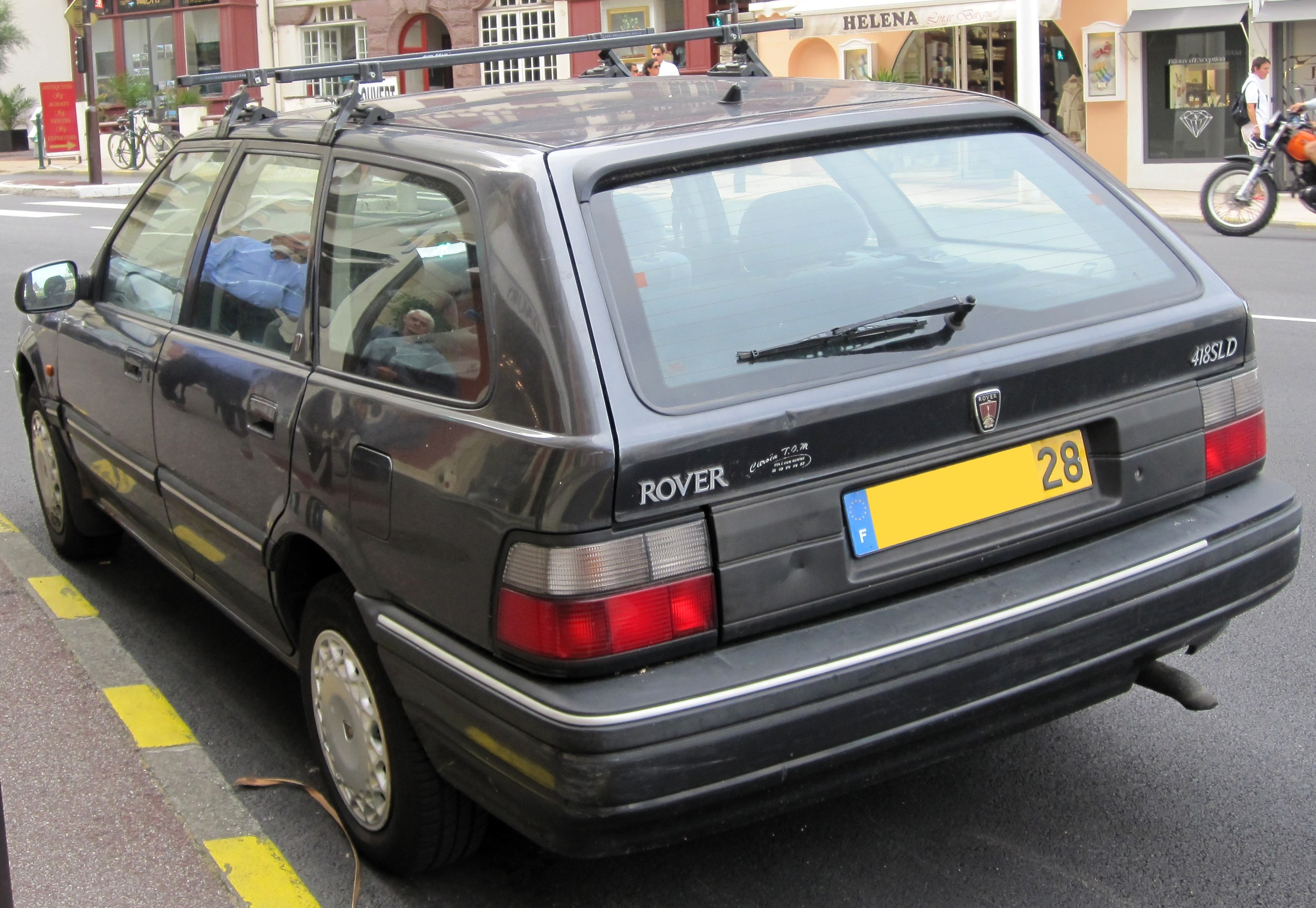
Rover 400 Tourer (Europe)

An estate — or station wagon — version was subsequently developed by Rover Special Products and introduced in the summer of 1994. Badged as the Rover 400 Tourer, this remained in production alongside the second-generation 400 until 1998, as no estate version of the latter car was built. Many of the 400 Tourers were exported to Japan.

The R8 Rover 200 and 400 were the first applications of Rover's K-series family of engines (appearing in 1.4 L (1,396 cc) twin-cam 16-valve form).

The 1.6 L (1,590 cc) version used either a Honda D16A6 and D16Z2 SOHC or D16A8 DOHC powerplant, while the 2.0 L M-series unit from the 800 Series followed soon afterwards (1991) in the sportier versions.

The Rover-engined models drove the front wheels via jointly developed Peugeot/Rover R65 gearboxes (1.4 litre) and Rover PG1 for the 1.6- and 2.0-litre versions. The Rover 420 GSI turbo and GSI Sport turbo, produced in limited numbers, were equipped with the turbocharged 197 bhp (147 kW) Rover T-series engine. Also available were two PSA (non-electronically controlled Lucas CAV injection pumps) Indirect injection diesel engines, with the choice of naturally aspirated 1.9-litre XUD9 or turbocharged 1.8 XUD7T engines. The Tourer eschewed the 1.4, naturally aspirated diesel, and the turbocharged petrol-engined options.

These engines were installed instead of the non-electronically controlled Bosch HPVE Direct Injection Rover MDi / Perkins Prima used in the Austin Maestro and Montego, as that engine, with its noisy combustion but lower fuel consumption, was deemed too unrefined for the new models.

A mid-life facelift in September 1993 (also applied to the Rover 200) saw the reintroduction of the Rover grille, which first reappeared on the R17 facelift of the Rover 800. This change was achieved without significant change to the remaining structure, but provided a more distinctive Rover "family look" and established a certain distance from the Honda Concerto.

== Rover 400 (HH-R; 1995–1999) ==
Rover 400 (HH-R)
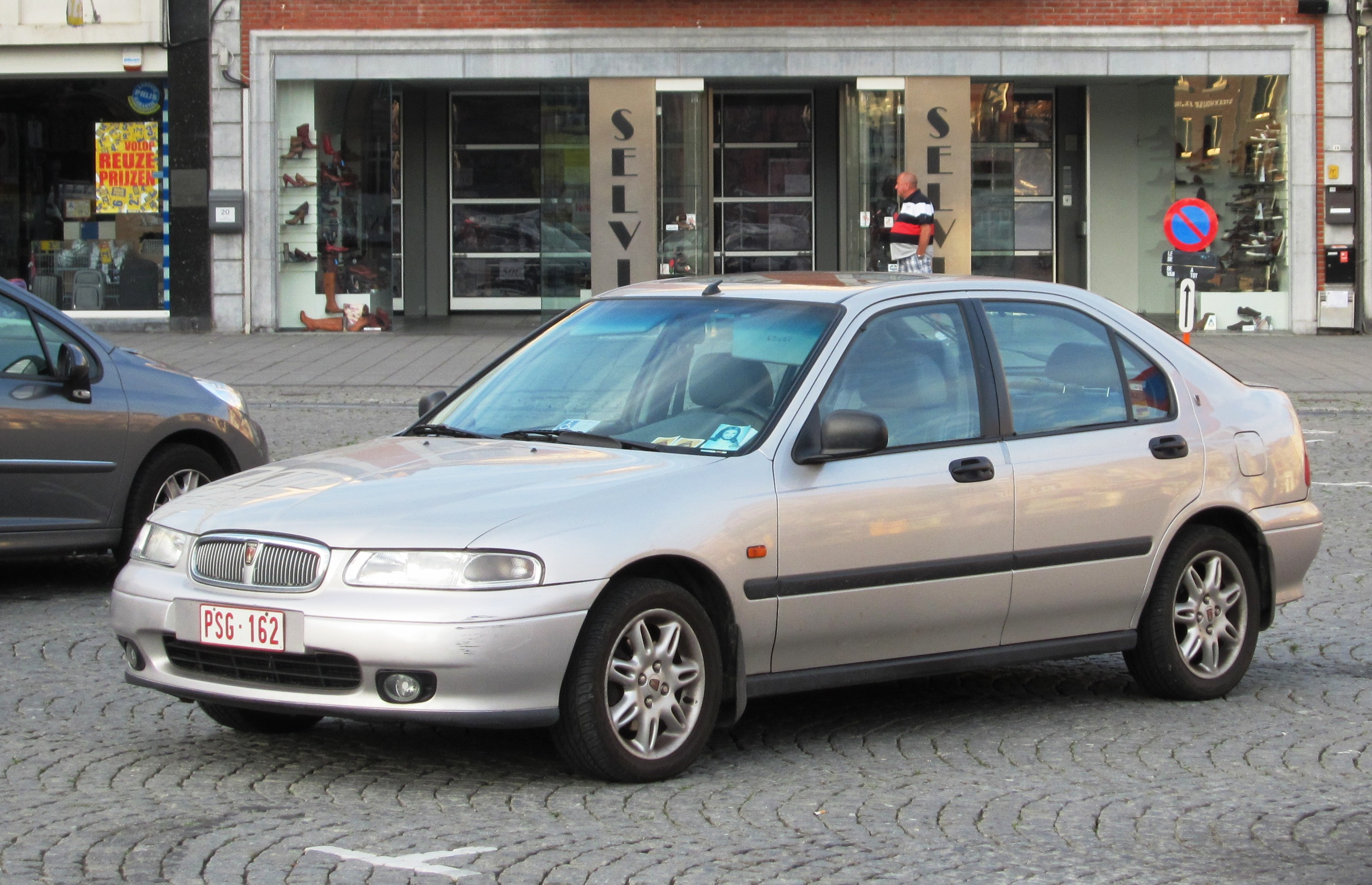

Overview
- Production: 1995–1999

Body and chassis
- Body style: 4-door saloon 5-door hatchback
- Related: Honda Domani; Rover 200 (R3)

Powertrain
- Engine: petrol: 1.4 L K-series I4; 1.6 L K-series I4; 1.6 L Honda D16 I4; 2.0 L T-Series I4; diesel: 2.0 L L-series turbo I4

Dimensions
- Wheelbase: 2,620 mm (103.1 in)
- Length: 4,320 mm (170.1 in)
- Width: 1,695 mm (66.7 in)
- Height: 1,390 mm (54.7 in)

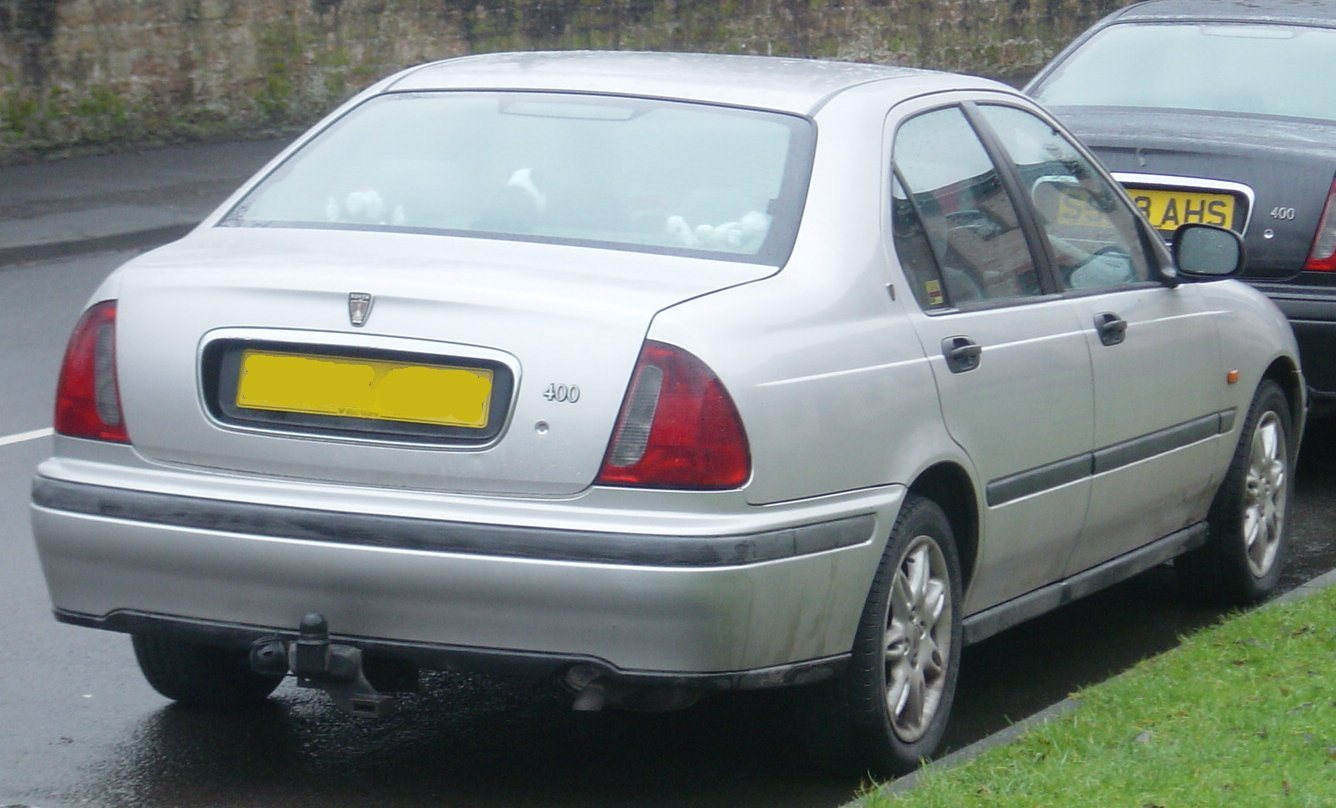
Rover 400 saloon (rear)

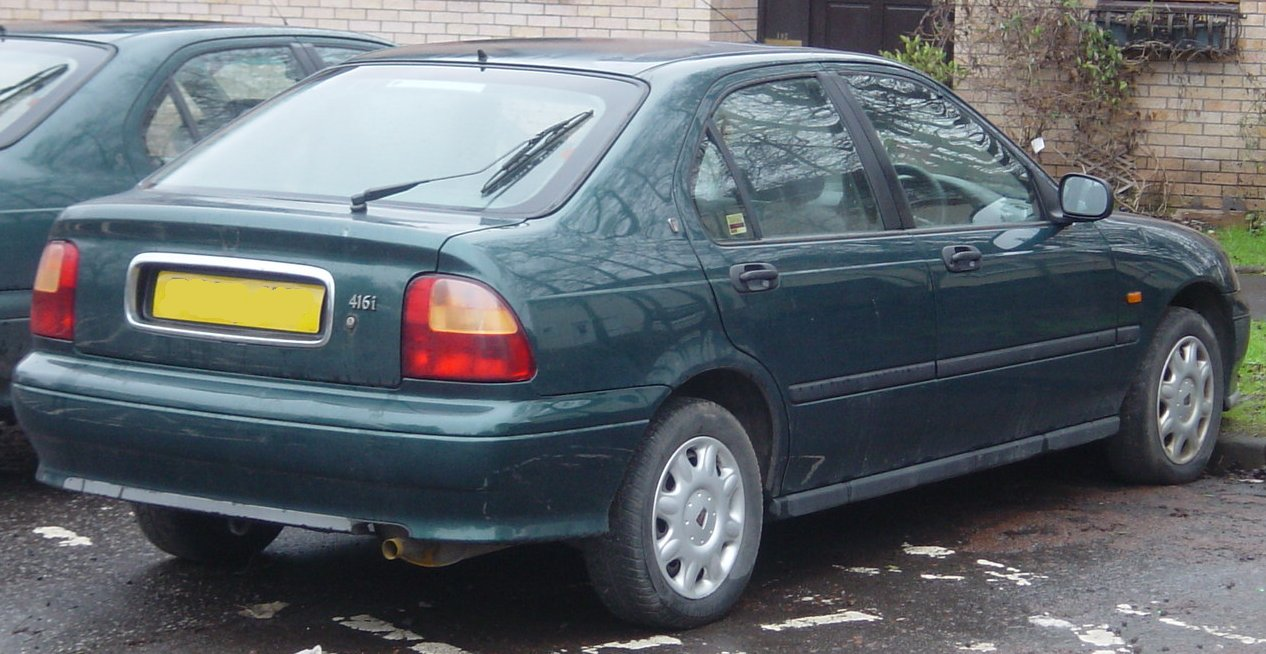
Rover 400 hatchback (rear)

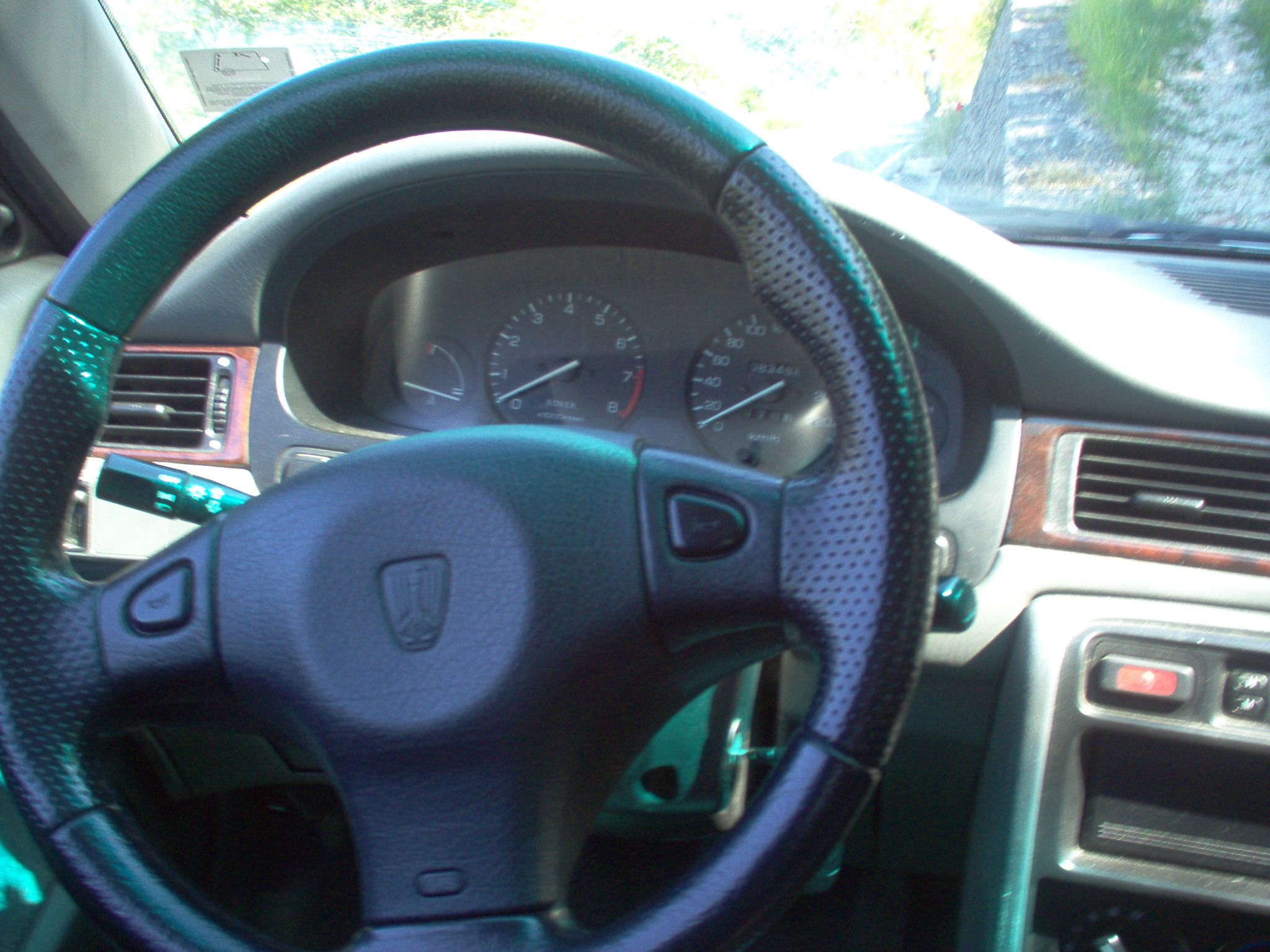
The dashboard of a Rover 400

The second-generation 400 Series, codenamed Theta or HH-R, was launched in 1995 as a hatchback and later as a saloon. It was based on the Honda Domani, which had been released in Japan in 1992, and was sold as part of the European Honda Civic range in five-door hatchback form. It was no longer as closely related to the 200 Series, which was revised independently by Rover but still shared many components with the 400. It would prove to be the final collaborative model between Rover and Honda, ending a partnership that had begun with the Triumph Acclaim in 1981.

Power came from 1.4- and 1.6-litre K-series, 1.6-litre Honda D-series SOHC (automatic gearbox only), and 2.0-litre Rover T-series petrol engines, as well as a 2.0-litre L-series turbodiesel borrowed from the larger 600 Series.

The Rover 400 might have been marketed as a small family car, as it compared closely in size and engine range with contemporary models such as the Ford Escort and Vauxhall Astra. Instead, Rover priced the car to compete with vehicles like the Ford Mondeo and Vauxhall Vectra. This was because Rover's only offering in the C/D segment at the time was the ageing Montego, and this gap in the company's line-up needed to be filled. A saloon version was later introduced for the 400.

The related Honda Civic was not sold as a saloon in the UK, although a four-door version was available in other markets. This helped to expand the appeal of the Rover model into the executive car segment, and to better differentiate the two cars.

The second-generation 400 was initially popular, being one of Britain's best-selling cars between 1995 and 1997. However, within three years it was being outsold by traditionally poorer-selling cars, such as the Volkswagen Passat and Renault Laguna.

== Rover 45 (1999–2005) ==
Rover 45
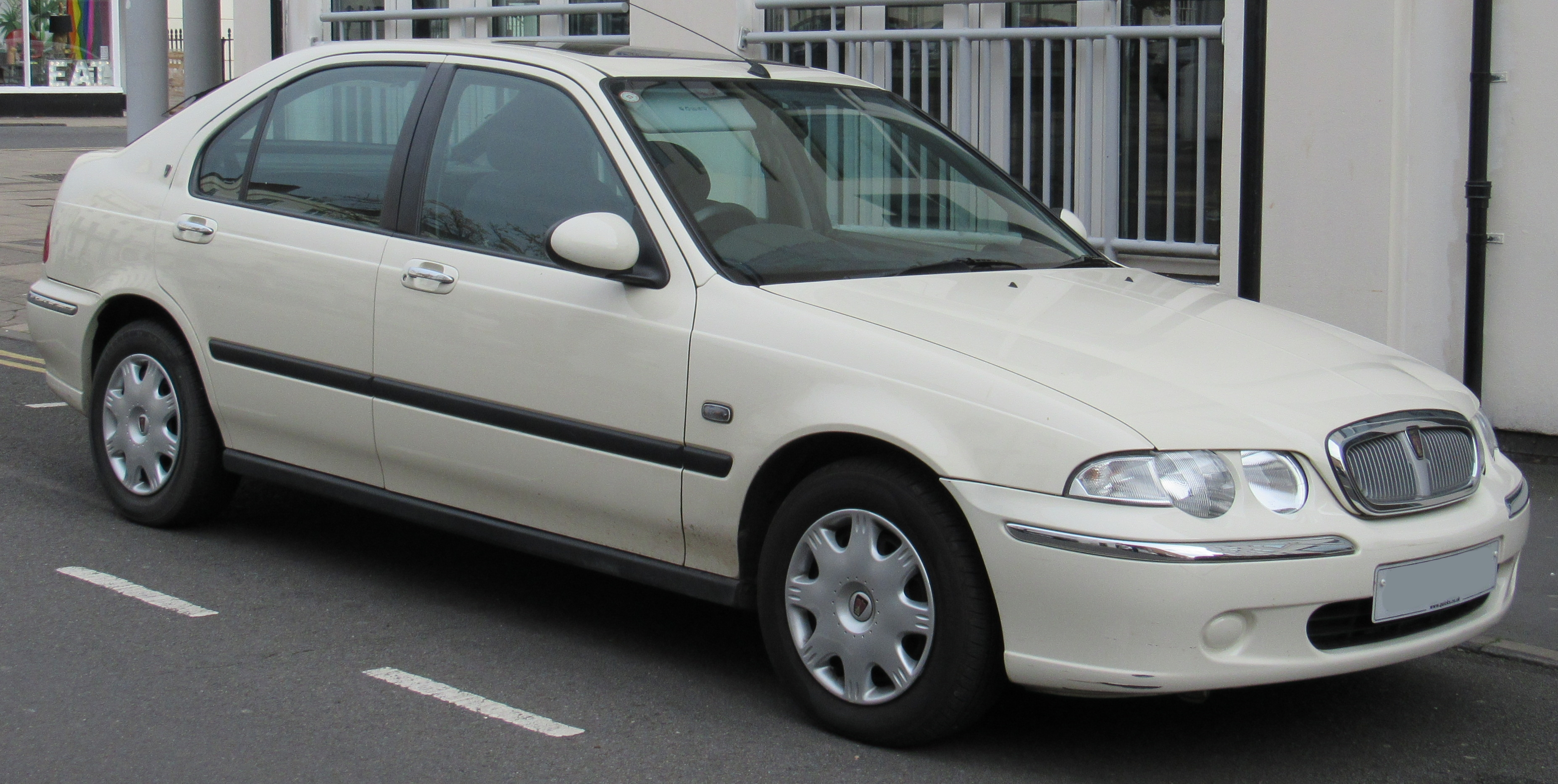

Overview
- Production: 1999–2005
- Designer: Peter Stevens

Body and chassis
- Body style: 4-door saloon 5-door hatchback
- Related: Honda Domani; Rover 25; MG ZS

Powertrain
- Engine: petrol: 1.4 L K-series I4; 1.6 L K-series I4; 1.6 L Honda D16Y3 I4; 1.8 L K-series I4; 2.0 L KV6 V6; diesel: 2.0 L L-series turbo I4

Dimensions
- Wheelbase: 2,620 mm (103.1 in)
- Length: 4,360 mm (171.7 in) (1999–2004 hatchback); 4,520 mm (178.0 in) (1999–2004 saloon); 4,386 mm (172.7 in) (2004–2005 hatchback); 4,540 mm (178.7 in) (2004–2005 saloon)
- Width: 1,695 mm (66.7 in) (1999–2004); 1,678 mm (66.1 in) (2004–2005)
- Height: 1,390 mm (54.7 in) (1999–2004); 1,386 mm (54.6 in) (2004–2005)

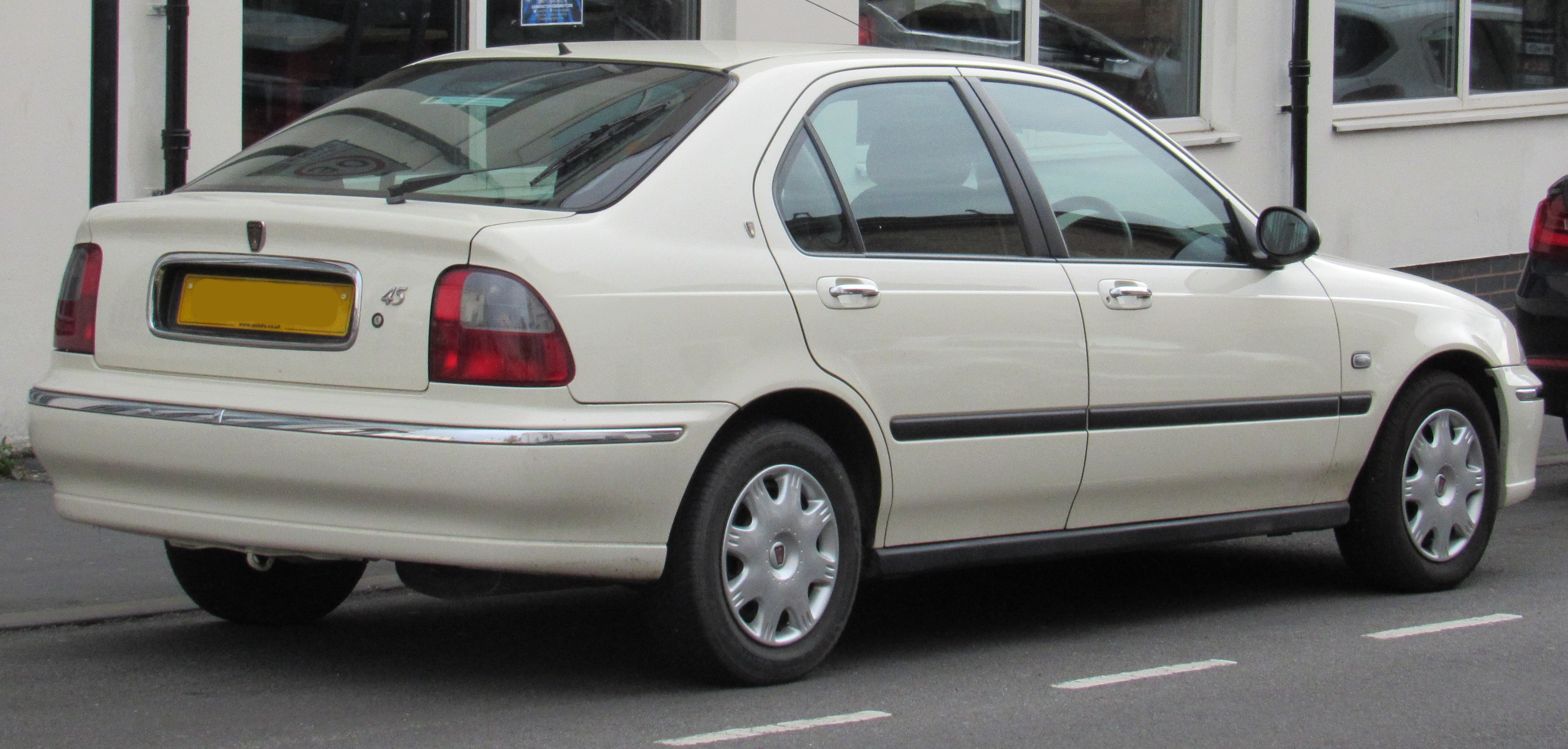
Rover 45 hatchback (rear)

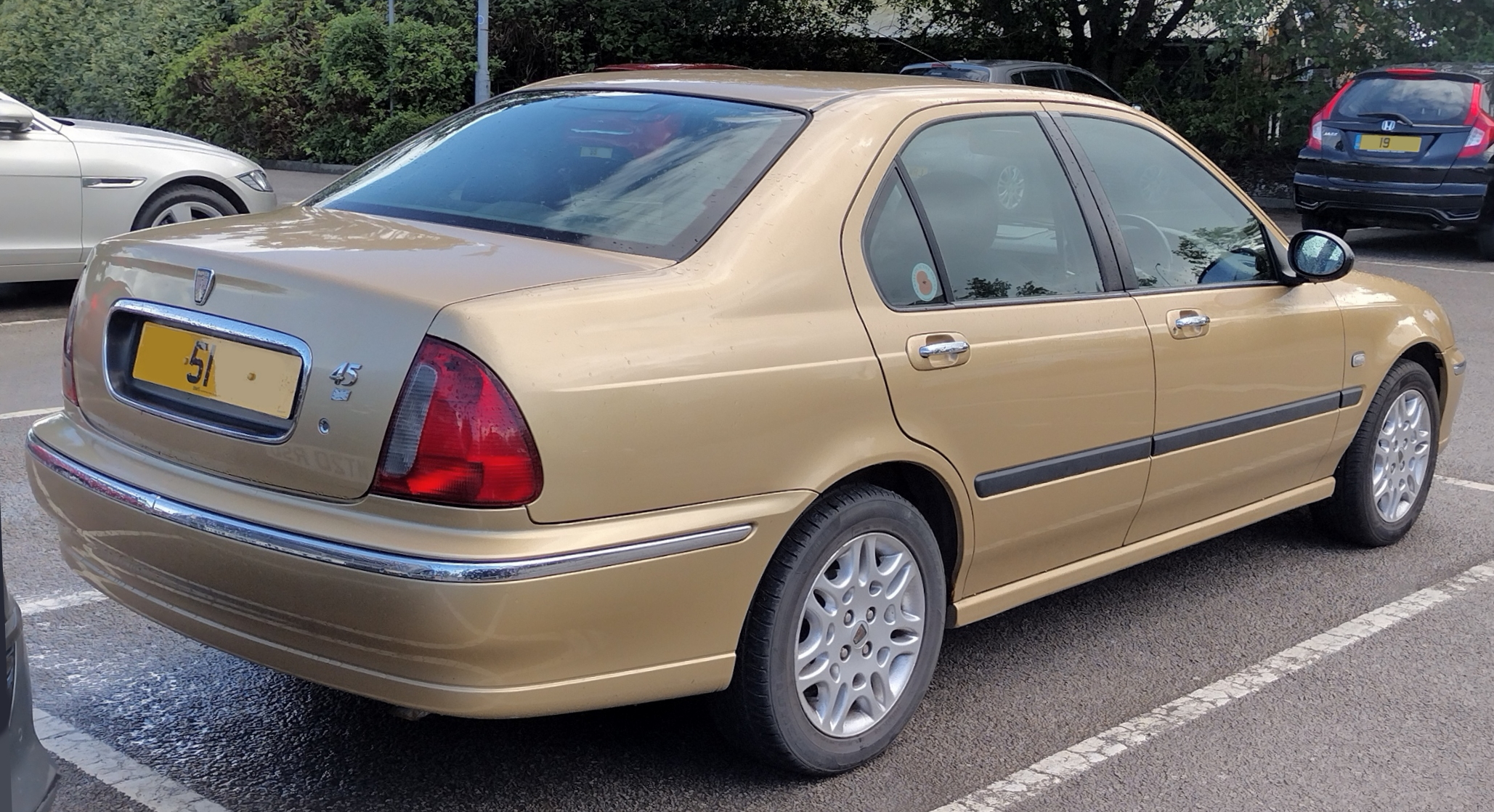
Rover 45 saloon (rear)

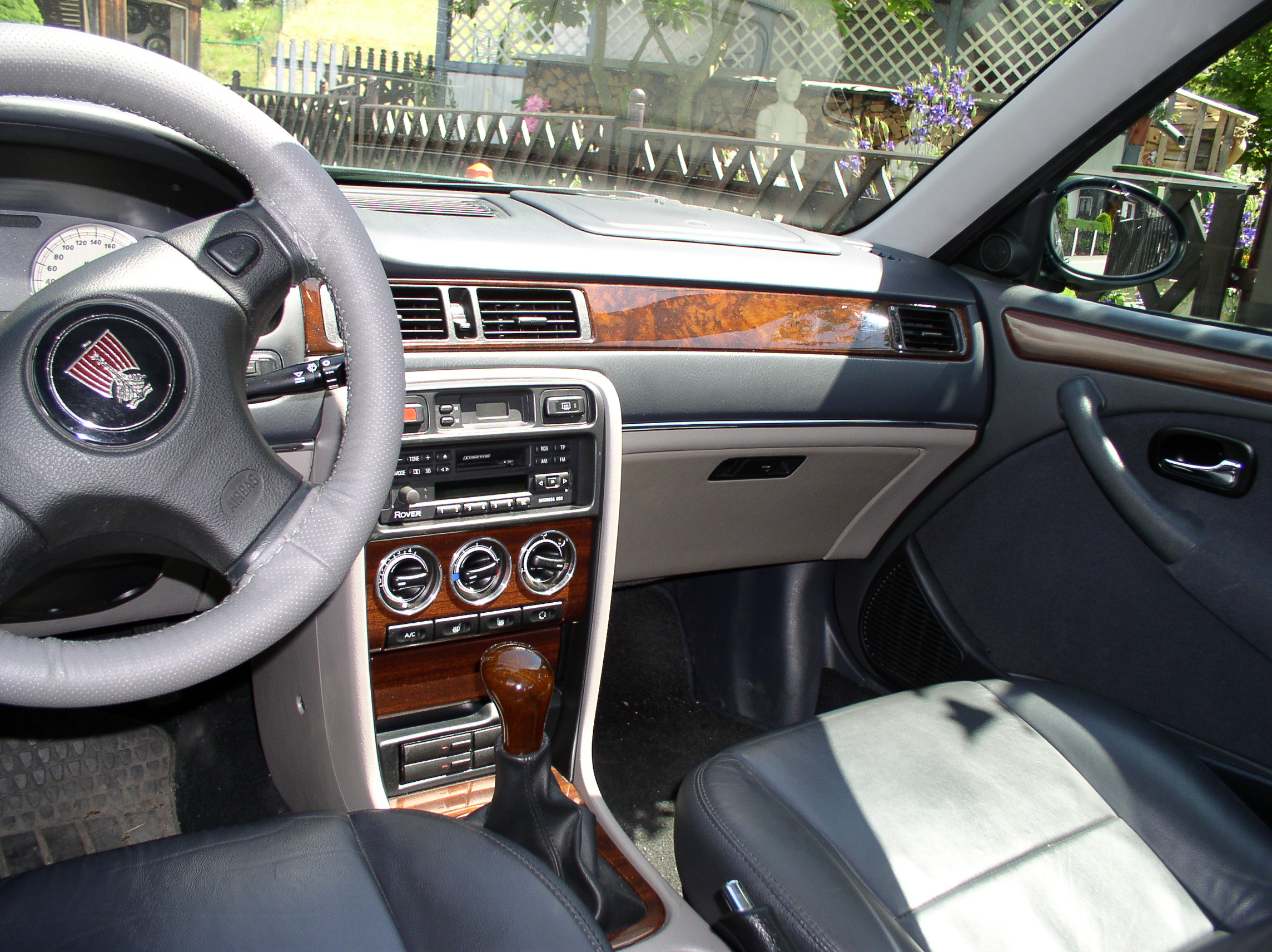
Interior (pre-facelift)

The Rover 400 was given a facelift in 1999, becoming the Rover 45. It was repositioned and priced to compete with the Ford Focus and Vauxhall Astra, rather than larger cars like the Ford Mondeo and Vauxhall Vectra. From 2001, a re-engineered hot hatch version of the Rover 45 was launched and sold as the MG ZS.

The 1.4- and 1.6-litre K series petrol and 2.0-litre L series diesel engines were carried over from the 400 Series, along with the introduction of a 1.8 K series and a 2.0-litre V6 from the larger Rover 75 (replacing the 2.0 T series four-cylinder petrol unit) – although this power unit was only available on saloon versions. The 45 came equipped with the better seating of the 75 and whilst the 400 models handled very well, the suspension was tuned to give much better controlled ride characteristics with quicker steering.

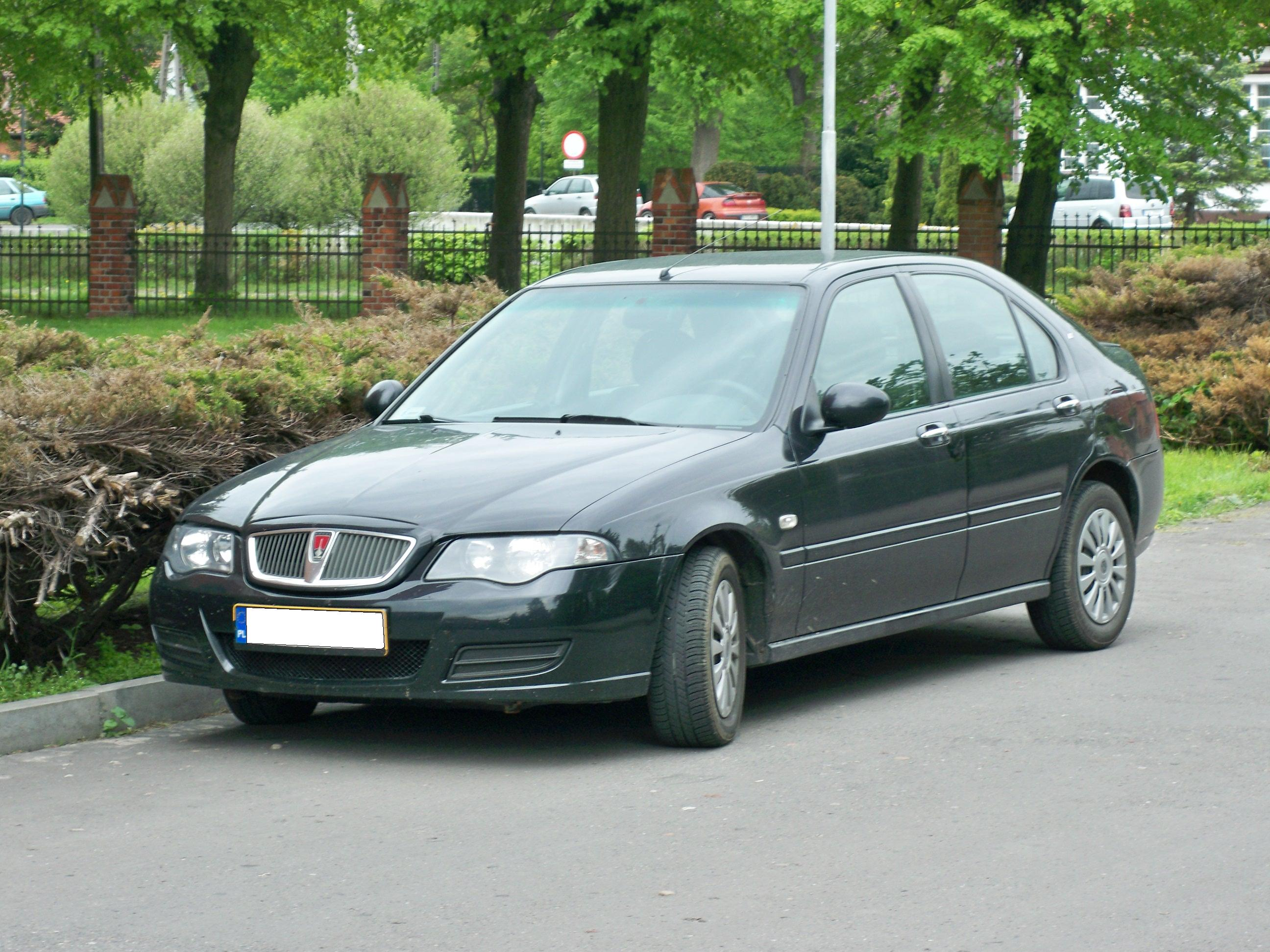
Rover 45 hatchback (post facelift)

The 45 was available with continuously variable transmission (CVT) supplied by the German manufacturer ZF Sachs which had previously been used in the MGF. This particular design of CVT consists of an oil cooled laminated steel belt (with external oil cooler) running on variable pulleys. The revised model boasted improved equipment levels, comfortable interior and reduced prices, compared with the preceding 400-badged models. While the asking price was now in line with other small family cars, the Rover 45 began to lose market share, its chances of success not helped by its aged design. Therefore, the 45 was never able to seriously compete with more modern designs, such as the Ford Focus and Vauxhall Astra in terms of popularity. It was also outsold by the likes of the Peugeot 307, Fiat Stilo, Volkswagen Golf and Renault Mégane.

A 2004 facelift was MG Rover's last effort to boost sales of the Rover 45, with a new front and rear-end styling, a redesigned interior with refreshed dash, centre console and new switchgear, revised suspension settings, improved equipment and lower prices. Some of these changes were necessitated by the end of Domani production in Japan, as Honda refused to continue the supply of certain parts.

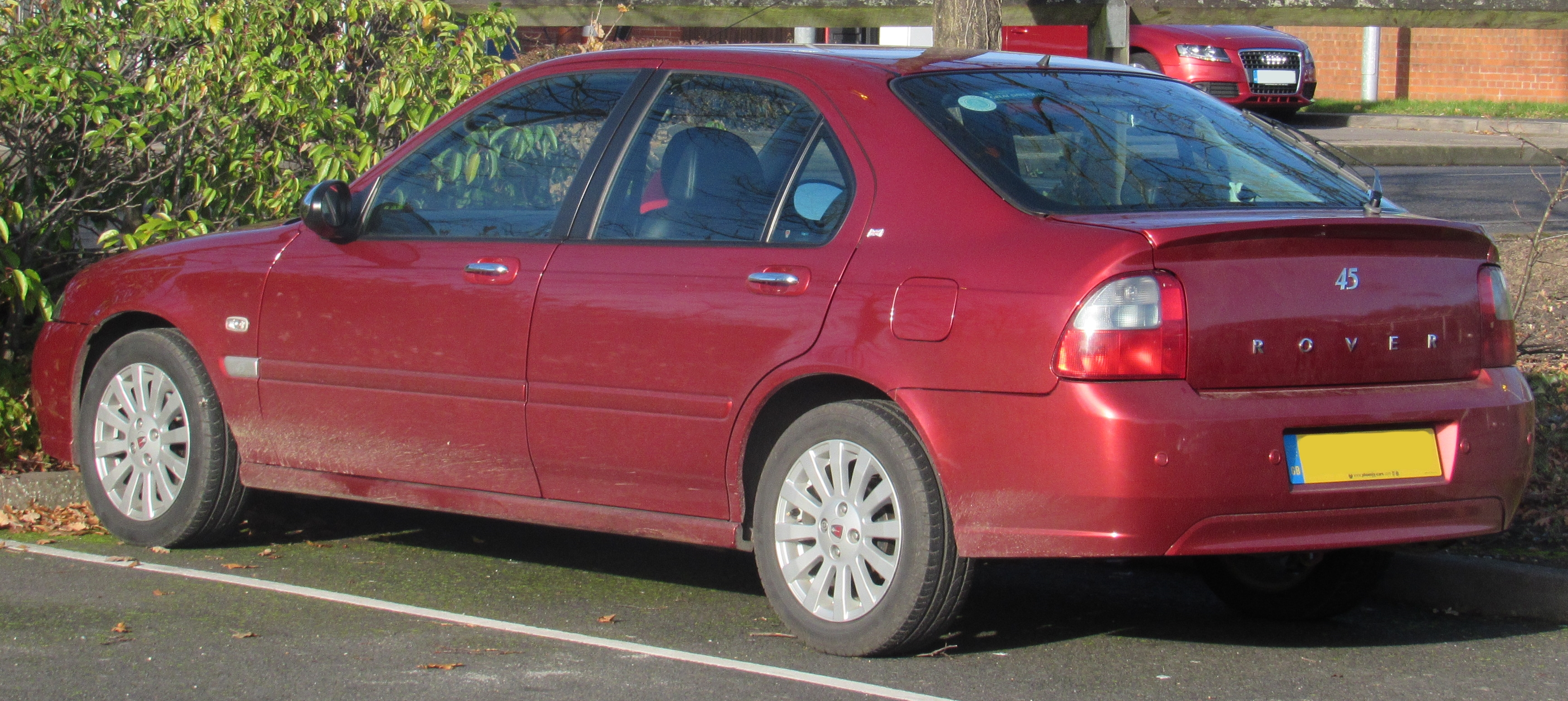
Rover 45 hatchback (post facelift)

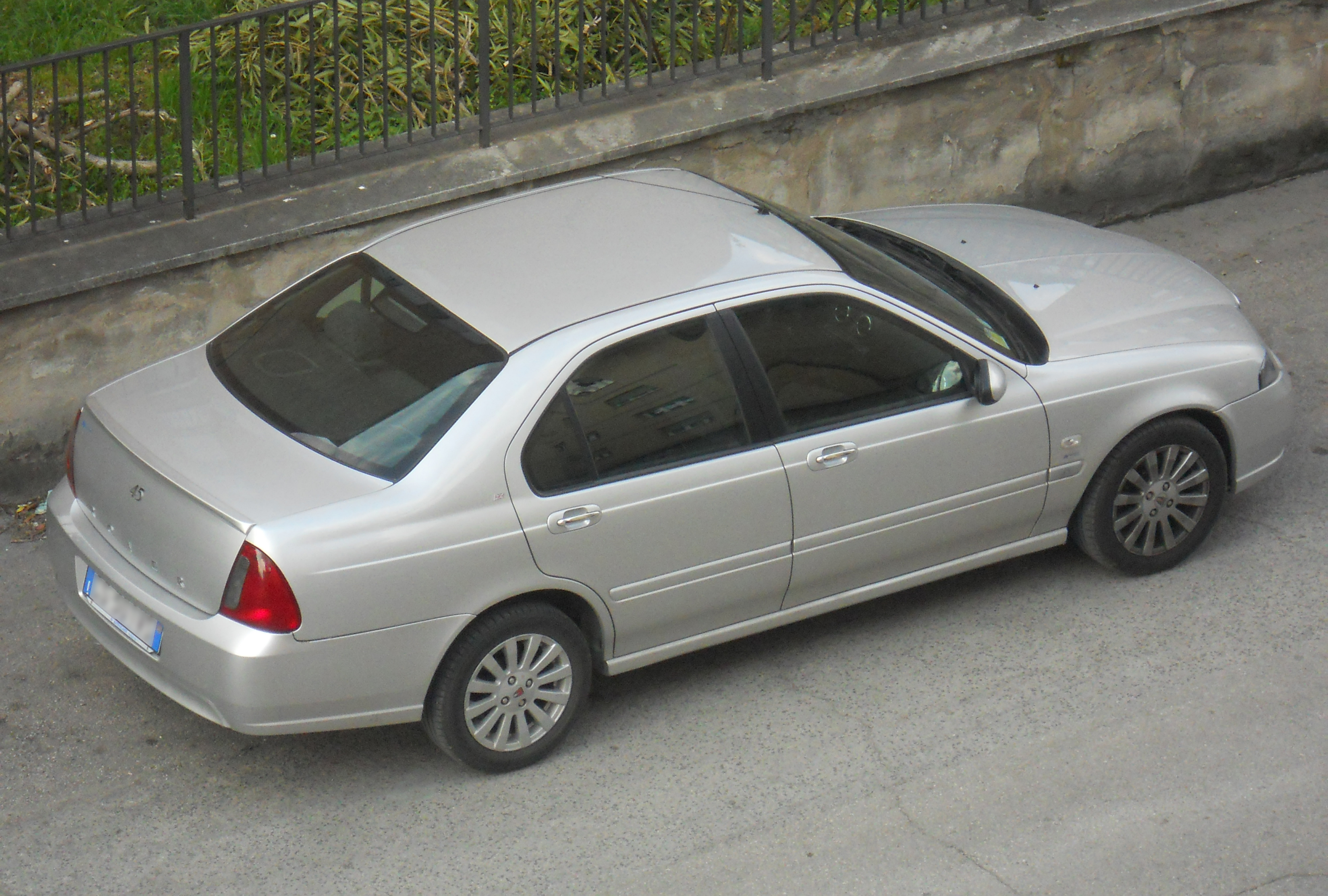
Rover 45 sedan (post facelift)

The original Rover 25 and 45 which were originally badged as the MG 3 and MG 5 were shown to the Chinese market for the first time in 2005. The only trim available as a lineup of models would've seen the Rover 25 using the MG3 ZR name with engines consisting of the 1.4 litre and 1.8 litre K-series petrol engines and the 2 litre L-series turbo diesel. This hatchback development would see the Rover based MG 3 be produced as the MG3 SW, a rebadged version of the Rover Streetwise in 2008.

Production of the Rover 45 stopped in April 2005, due to the bankruptcy of Rover. As Honda owned the rights to the Rover 45's design and platform at the time and the eventual joint talks between Nanjing Auto and MG to purchase the MG brand, Honda stopped their licensing agreement with MG in response and the Rover 45-based MG 5 in its 2004 facelifted hatchback form never saw production in China. In 2009 at the Shanghai Auto Show, Nanjing Auto tried again with the MG5 name. This time, the car was based on the 2004 facelifted MG ZS. The MG ZS-based MG 5 project was then cancelled entirely. The MG 5 name however would later be produced by SAIC Motor as a completely new model from 2012 onwards.

=== Security Ratings ===
Rover 45 models were tested on three occasions by Thatcham's New Vehicle Security Ratings (NVSR) organisation, and achieved the following ratings:

01/00–12/02	Rating
Theft of car:	4/5 stars
Theft from car:	2/5 stars

01/03–03/04	Rating
Theft of car:	4/5 stars
Theft from car:	3/5 stars

04/04–05/05	Rating
Theft of car:	5/5 stars
Theft from car:	4/5 stars

== Powertrain ==
These were the engines available for the Rover 400 (1995–1999) and Rover 45 (2000–2005):

Years	Model & Transmission	Engine	Power	Torque	Top Speed	0–100 km/h (0-62 mph)	Economy (MPG imp)	Emissions (CO_{2})
Petrol							Economy (MPG imp)	Emissions (CO_{2})
1995–1999	1.4 16v Manual	1.4 L, I4	103 PS (76 kW; 102 hp)	127 N·m (94 lb·ft)	185 km/h (115 mph)	11.0 secs	41.0 mpg	175 g/km
1999–2005	1.4 16v Manual	1.4 L, I4	103 PS (76 kW; 102 hp)	123 N·m (91 lb·ft)	185 km/h (115 mph)	11.2 secs	40.0 mpg	168 g/km
1995–2004	1.6 16v Manual	1.6 L, I4	111 PS (82 kW; 109 hp)	145 N·m (107 lb·ft)	190 km/h (118 mph)	10.0 secs	39.0 mpg	178 g/km
1995–2000	1.6 16v Hondamatic	D16Y3 or D16A2	115 PS (85 kW; 113 hp)	143 N·m (107 lb·ft)	190 km/h (118 mph)	12.0 secs	32.0 mpg	212 g/km
1997–2005	1.8 16v Manual	1.8 L, I4	117 PS (86 kW; 115 hp)	160 N·m (118 lb·ft)	195 km/h (121 mph)	9.3 secs	38.0 mpg	174 g/km
1999–2005	1.8 16v Stepspeed	1.8 L, I4	117 PS (86 kW; 115 hp)	160 N·m (118 lb·ft)	184 km/h (118 mph)	10.3 secs	33.0 mpg	203 g/km
1995–2000	2.0 16v Manual	2.0 L, I4	136 PS (100 kW; 134 hp)	185 N·m (137 lb·ft)	200 km/h (124 mph)	9.0 secs	32.0 mpg	210 g/km
2000–2004	2.0 V6 Stepspeed	2.0 L, V6	149 PS (110 kW; 147 hp)	185 N·m (137 lb·ft)	200 km/h (124 mph)	9.5 secs	28.0 mpg	234 g/km
Diesel
1995–1999	2.0 TD 86 Manual	2.0 L, I4	86 PS (63 kW; 85 hp)	170 N·m (125 lb·ft)	169 km/h (105 mph)	13.0 secs	49.0 mpg	168 g/km
1995–1999	2.0 TD 105 Manual	2.0 L, I4	105 PS (77 kW; 104 hp)	210 N·m (155 lb·ft)	185 km/h (115 mph)	10.4 secs	53.0 mpg	166 g/km
1999–2005	2.0 TD 101 Manual	2.0 L, I4	101 PS (74 kW; 100 hp)	240 N·m (177 lb·ft)	185 km/h (115 mph)	10.6 secs	52.0 mpg	150 g/km
2002–2005	2.0 TD 113 Manual	2.0 L, I4	113 PS (83 kW; 111 hp)	260 N·m (192 lb·ft)	190 km/h (118 mph)	9.8 secs	50.0 mpg	150 g/km

== Replacement model projects ==
=== R30 ===
During the end of the 1990s, replacements for the Rover 25 and 45 models were developed by Rover Group under the codename R30. Intended for launch in 2003 as the Rover 35 and 55, these would have been based on an all new platform. At launch, these would have used K-series engines, but new Valvetronic engines were anticipated to be introduced by 2006. The R30 Project was cancelled, when BMW divested its ownership of Rover Group in March 2000.

It is possible that some of the development work may eventually have benefited the First Gen. BMW 1 Series (E8X).

=== RD/X60 ===
Following the termination of the R30 Project, from 2001, MG Rover planned to replace the 45 with a model range based on the Rover 75 platform. Collectively referred to as the RD/X60 project (sometimes also written RDX60), the range was intended to comprise the following variants:

- RD60: Rover hatchback
- X60: MG hatchback
- RD61: Rover saloon
- RD62: Rover "tourer" estate

A preview of how the RD62 "Tourer" might appear was given at the 2002 Geneva Motor Show in the form of the Rover TCV (Tourer Concept Vehicle) concept car.

During the design process, MG Rover's design partner Tom Walkinshaw Racing (TWR) went into administration. MG Rover lost access to most of the computer aided design work for their new vehicle. Efforts were made to reclaim these from the administrators, however, the resulting uncertainty and delays made it impossible to progress with the project.

The abortive SAIC Deal of August 2004 was to have included bringing a replacement for the ageing 45 to market, and the RD/X60 was a likely candidate for this. Ultimately, no such joint venture was entered into. After MG Rover's collapse, SAIC bought some of the company's intellectual property, and released a concept called the Roewe W2. Like the RD/X60, this was partly based on the platform of the Rover 75. The W2 entered production in April 2008, as the Roewe 550.

A hatchback derivative of the 550 was announced in November 2009, as the MG6.
