= Rover G series =

Overview
- Manufacturer: Sonalika
- Production: 2007–present

Layout
- Configuration: Straight-4
- Displacement: 2.0 L (1994 cc; 121.7 cu in)
- Cylinder bore: 84.5 mm (3.3 in)
- Piston stroke: 88.9 mm (3.5 in)
- Cylinder block material: Cast iron
- Cylinder head material: Aluminium
- Valvetrain: SOHC; DOHC
- Compression ratio: 17.0:1; 19.5:1

Combustion
- Turbocharger: 1 turbocharger with intercooler
- Fuel system: Common rail
- Fuel type: Diesel
- Cooling system: Water-cooled

Output
- Power output: 102–163 PS (75–120 kW)
- Torque output: 220–285 Nm

Chronology
- Predecessor: Rover L-Series; BMW M47

The Rover G-series engine is a range of inline-4 common-rail diesel engines designed and engineered by Powertrain Ltd, a sister company to MG Rover Group, and has been produced by Indian automotive multinational Sonalika Group since 2007.

== Description ==
The Rover G series is a water-cooled and turbocharged inline four-cylinder diesel engine with common-rail injection. It is based upon the Rover L-series engine. The block is made of cast iron with an aluminium cylinder head. The engine uses an engine management system made by Siemens using common-rail injection with an injection pressure of 1600 bar. It uses a turbocharger and intercooler. 8-valve and 16-valve versions of the engine are produced, differing in valvetrain and subsequent cylinder head design.

It is marketed in India by Sonalika subsidiary ICML as the 2.0 CRD-FI BS IV.

=== 8-valve ===
The first production G-series engine was an 8-valve introduced in the 2007 ICML Rhino in collaboration with MG Rover and additionally used in the 2012 Chevrolet Tavera Neo 3. Each cylinder has one inlet and one exhaust valve and a single belt-driven overhead camshaft.

=== 16-valve ===
The first production 16-valve engine appeared in the 2012 ICML Extreme. Each cylinder is equipped with two inlet and exhaust valves and two belt-driven overhead camshafts.

== History ==
The G-series engine development work began in 2002, out of the need at MG Rover Group to replace both the common-rail M47R engine in the Rover 75 and MG ZT and the pump-injector L-series engine in the Rover 25, Rover 45, MG ZR and MG ZS.

The engine, known as Galileo, spent three years in development prior to MG Rover Group’s collapse in 2005. To be used across the MG Rover Group range of cars, with the exception of the TF sports car, the new engine’s targets were to emulate the BMW M47R in power, torque and refinement and meet Euro 4 emissions compliance. To achieve these targets, MG Rover Group engineers introduced a new cylinder head, valves, pistons and a Siemens engine management system using a common-rail system equipped with the latest injector technology available at the time to the L series' existing architecture, carrying over the cylinder block and sump. A new acoustic engine cover was designed for the engine. The throttle system was redesigned and relocated from the engine bay to the top of the throttle pedal. However, due to ongoing throttle calibration throughout development, the engine was reportedly hard to start in cold conditions. Engineers let the engine warm up before using it.

According to former MG Rover Group homologation engineer Nic Fasci, the G-series engine met its refinement target: “You could park an M47 and G-series [Rover 75] next to each other, set them idling and ask people to choose which was which, and everyone got it wrong. G series was much quieter at idle.”

The G series likewise met its performance targets. Aside from a split intercooler hose, due to the amount of air being circulated at high pressure, engineers recalled that the engine performed well. In addition to being quieter to the M47R it was engineered to replace, the engine was reported to be punchy and rather frugal. By using a fully electronic variable-geometry Garrett turbocharger resulting in a variation of boost pressure, when installed in a Rover 75 producing 100 kW, engineers reported that the engine "was fantastic...it flew and never missed a beat" whilst being driven at "full chat" to Sweden to sign off work on new brake control and electronic stability programs.

The engine was engineered as both an 8-valve and a 16-valve unit with various power outputs.

8-valve	16-valve
60 kW	120 kW
75 kW	
85 kW	
100 kW	

G-series engine development almost stopped following a 'royal decree' by Kevin Howe to engineers to stop working on the engine as, as a former engineer recalled, MG Rover Group management stated that "diesel is not the way forward...". MG Rover engineers continued to work on the engine in secret despite the order. When MG Rover Group management reversed the decision and encouraged the engineering team to continue with the project, due to their continued work, engineers had no real loss of engine development time.

However, whilst engineers were working around the clock on the engine, it was still undergoing calibration tests as MG Rover Group entered administration in 2005. Engineers had nine months to complete the engine calibration as soon as prototype components started to arrive at Powertrain, and still needed to fully validate the engine's state of tune. At the time of MG Rover Group's collapse, tooling for all major components had either been completed or was in progress, with the remaining tooling being for various pieces of pipework. Following MG Rover Group's collapse in April 2005, Indian multinational automotive company Sonalika – who had been manufacturing components for the engine – bought the rights to the entire engine and have produced it since 2007.

== Technical data ==
Engine	Bore × stroke (mm)	Displacement	Valves	Power at rpm	Torque at rpm	Compression ratio	Redline	Year
G-series / 2.0 CRD-FI	84.5 × 88.9	1994 cc	8	75 kW (102 PS) at 3600	220 N⋅m (162 lb⋅ft) at 2000-2500	19.5:1	5000 rpm	2007
G-series / 2.0 CRD-FI	84.5 × 88.9	1994 cc	16	90 kW (122 PS) at 4000	285 N⋅m (210 lb⋅ft) at 1750–2500	17.0:1	5000 rpm	2007
G-series / 2.0 CRD-FI	84.5 × 88.9	1994 cc	16	120 kW (163 PS) at 4000	285 N⋅m (210 lb⋅ft) at 1750–2500	17.0:1	5000 rpm	2016

== Applications ==
8-valve
ICML Rhino
Chevrolet Tavera Neo3

16-valve
ICML Rhino Extreme
