= DB7 =

DB7 may refer to:

- David Beckham (born 1975), English footballer who played for Manchester United and England wearing the number seven shirt
- The Douglas DB-7 bomber, also known as the A-20 Boston
- The Aston Martin DB7 motor car
