= Aston Martin DB7 =

Aston Martin vehicle

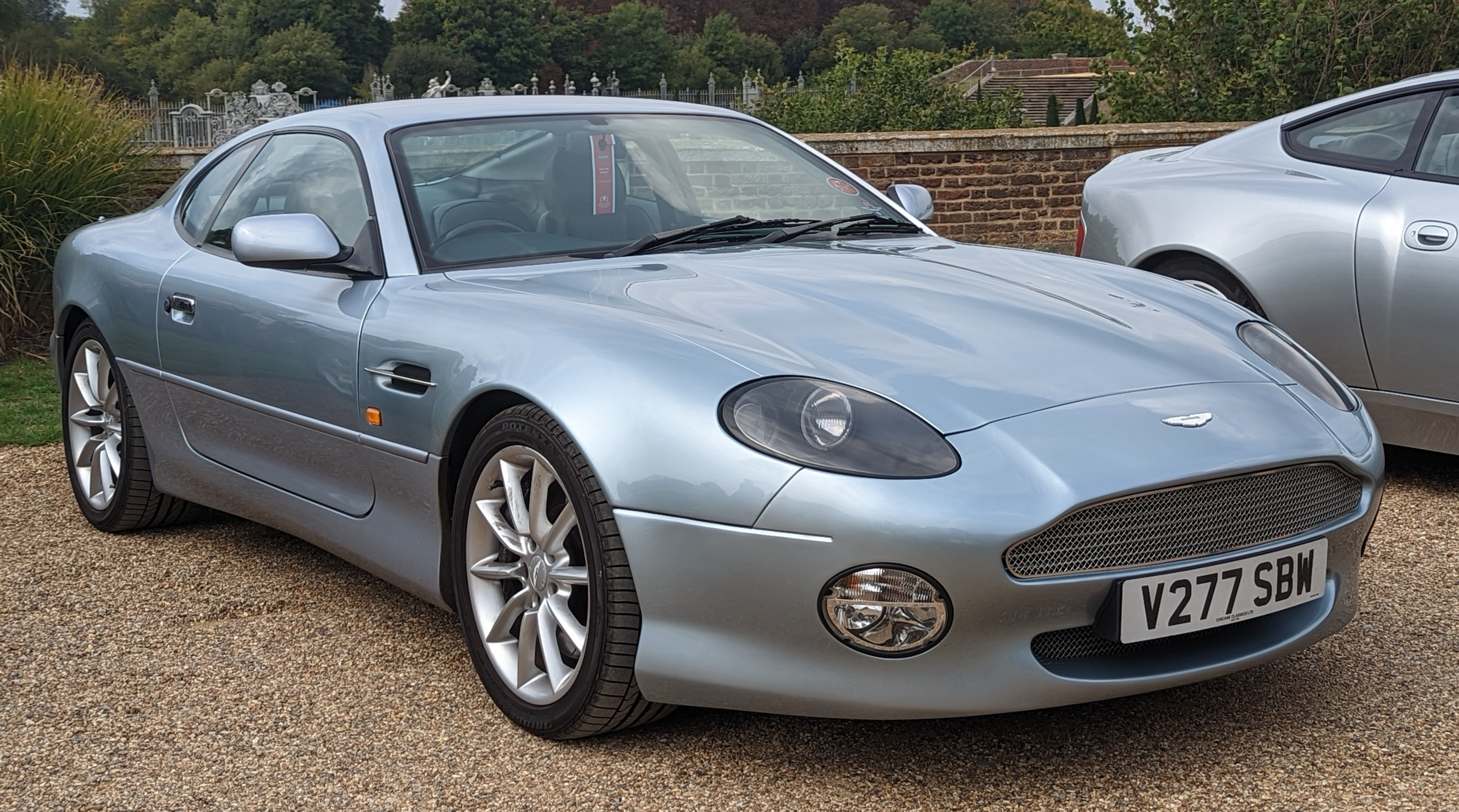
- Aston Martin DB7 V12 Vantage

Overview
- Manufacturer: Aston Martin Lagonda Limited
- Model code: XX
- Production: September 1994 – December 2004; 7,000 produced
- Model years: 1994–1999 (U.S. & Canada for I6 model); 1999–2003 (U.S. & Canada for Vantage model)
- Assembly: United Kingdom: Bloxham, Oxfordshire
- Designer: Ian Callum; Keith Helfet

Body and chassis
- Class: Grand tourer (S)
- Body style: 2-door coupé; 2-door convertible
- Layout: Front-mid-engine, rear-wheel-drive
- Platform: Jaguar XJS (modified)
- Related: Jaguar XK8

Powertrain
- Engine: 3.2 L AJ6 supercharged I6; 5.9 L Aston Martin V12
- Transmission: 4-speed GM 4L80-E automatic (I6); 5-speed Getrag 290 manual (I6); 5-speed ZF 5HP30 automatic (V12); 6-speed Tremec T-56 manual (V12)

Dimensions
- Wheelbase: 2,591 mm (102.0 in)
- Length: 4,646 mm (182.9 in) (DB7); 4,692 mm (184.7 in) (Vantage)
- Width: 1,830 mm (72.0 in)
- Height: 1,268 mm (49.9 in)
- Kerb weight: 1,825 kg (4,023 lb) (coupé); 1,800 kg (3,968 lb) (Vantage); 1,900 kg (4,200 lb) (Volante)

Chronology
- Predecessor: Aston Martin DB6
- Successor: Aston Martin DB9

The Aston Martin DB7 is a car that was produced by British luxury car manufacturer Aston Martin from September 1994 to December 2004. It was designed by Ian Callum and Keith Helfet as a grand tourer in coupé and convertible bodystyles. The prototype was complete by November 1992 and debuted at the Geneva Motor Show in March 1993. The six-cylinder DB7 (based on the Jaguar AJ6 engine) was positioned as an "entry-level" model below the hand-built V8 Virage introduced a few years earlier. At the time, the DB7 was the most-produced Aston Martin automobile in the company’s history, with more than 7,000 built before it was replaced by the DB9 in 2004.

== Overview ==
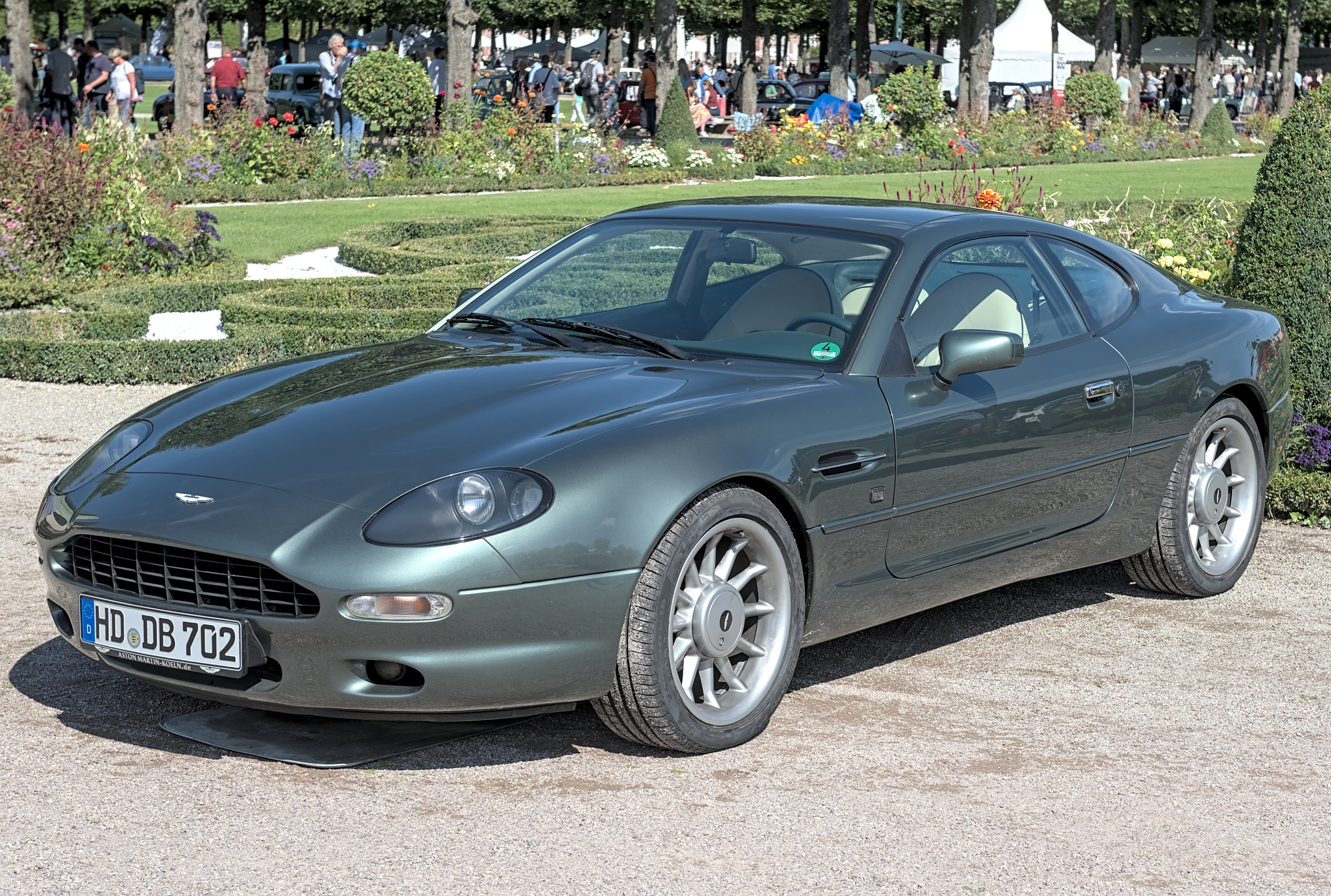

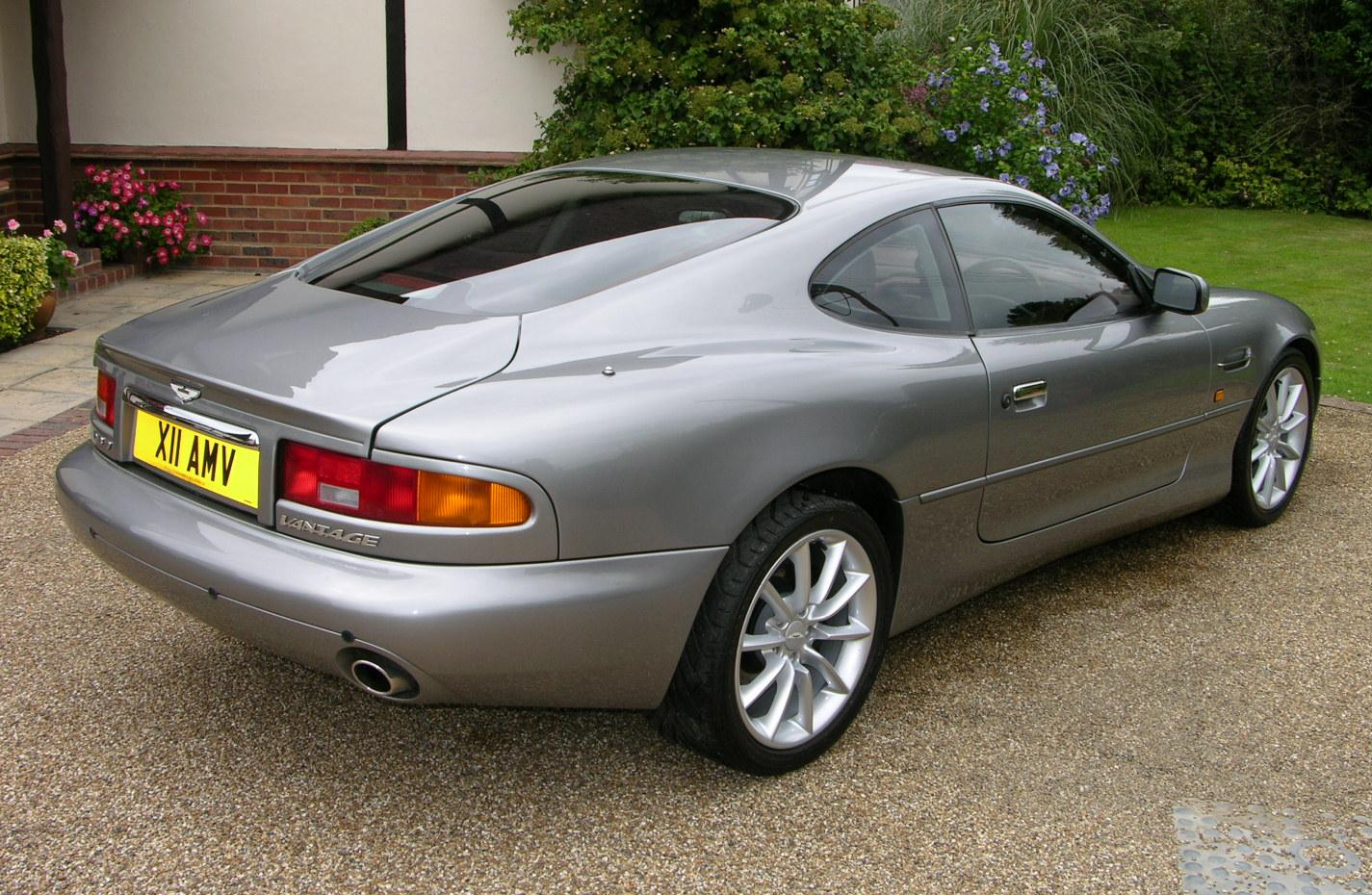
Coupé

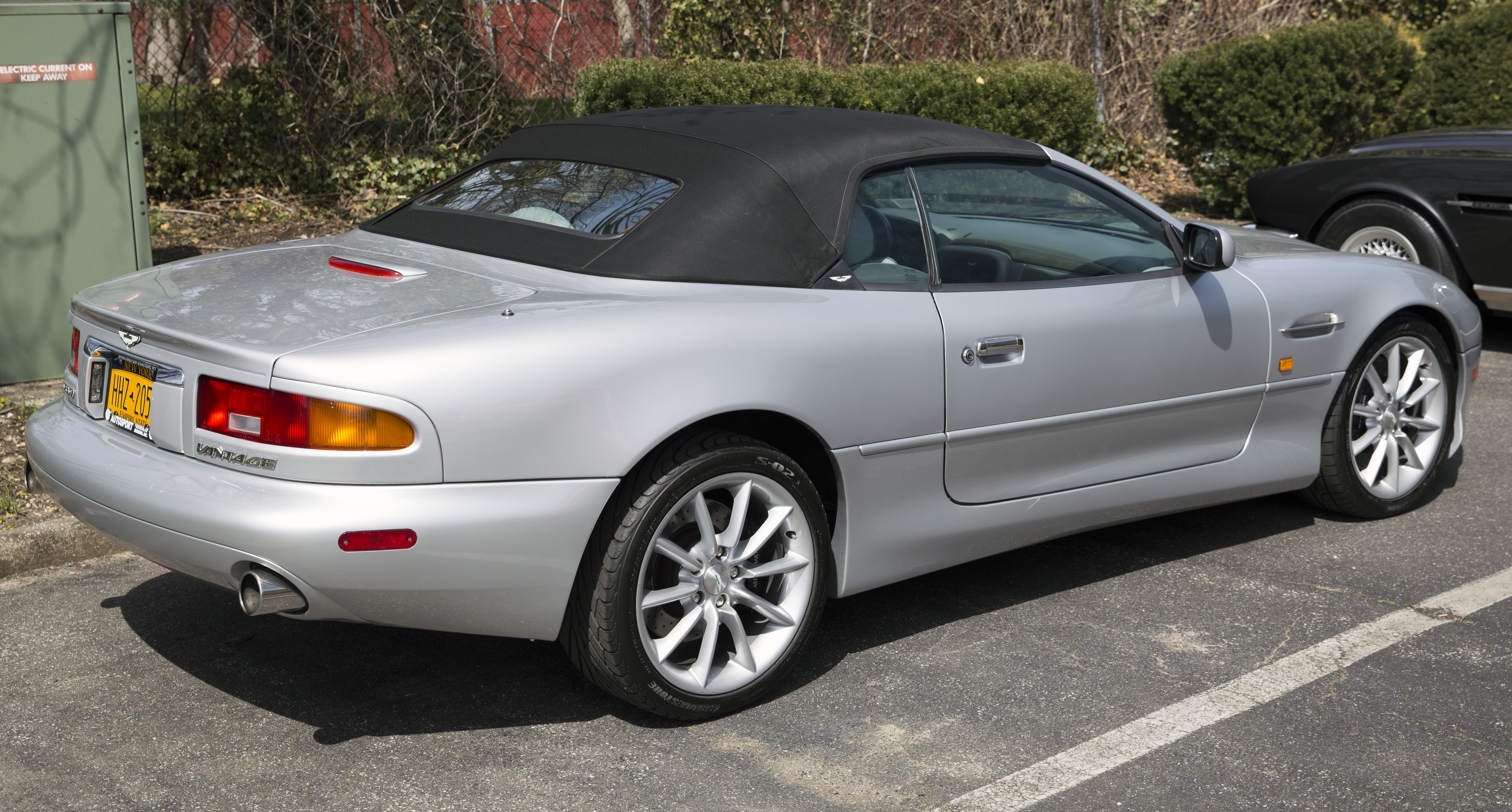
Volante

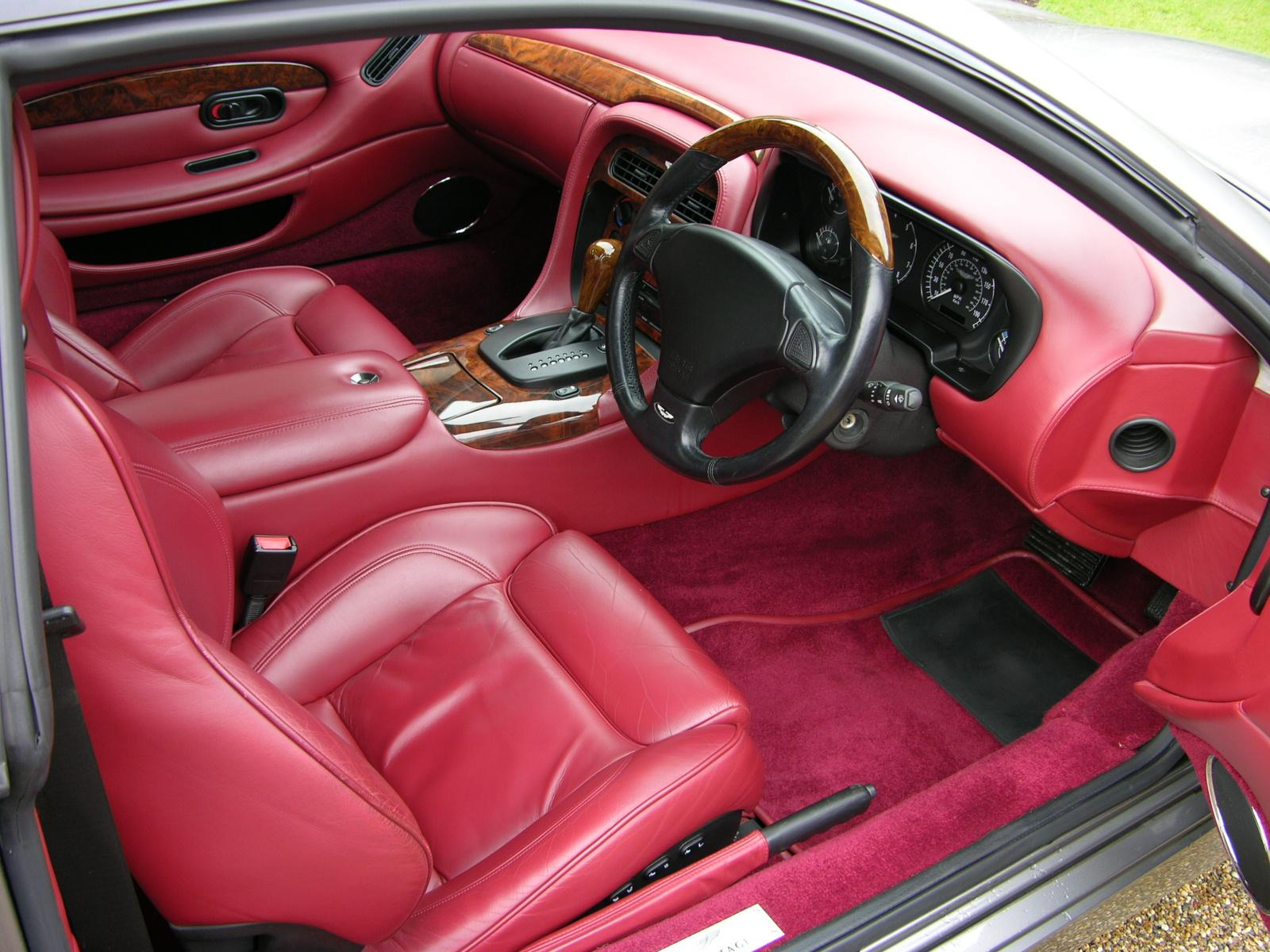
Interior

The DB7, known internally as the XX project, was made mostly with resources from Jaguar Cars and had the financial backing of the Ford Motor Company, owner of Aston Martin from 1988 to 2007. The DB7's platform is an evolution of the Jaguar XJS platform, though with many changes.

The DB7 began life as a successor to the Jaguar XJS, envisioned by Tom Walkinshaw of TWR. Walkinshaw had been impressed by the XJS' potential after driving it in the European Touring Car Championship in the late 1970s and early 1980s and wanted to re-body the car so it would have more modern styling. He initially wanted to engage Peter Stevens to design such a car but he refused due to his on going projects at the time. Walkinshaw then engaged Ian Callum, who was new in the car design work at the time, to design the car.

Jaguar had been struggling to replace the XJS due to its weak financial position. A project codenamed the XJ41/42 (41 for the coupé, 42 for the convertible) was already in development stage in the company, mooted to be called the F-Type when completed and was designed by Keith Helfet. When American automobile manufacturer Ford acquired both Jaguar and Aston Martin, the new management cancelled the XJ41/42 project in 1990 because of the car's heavier weight than the XJS, the project's high budget and also the employee overtime spent on the car. Seeing the potential of the abandoned project, Walkinshaw based his concept on the XJ41 and tasked Ian Callum to design his envisioned body around the XJ41. Inspired by the Nissan 300ZX, Callum redesigned the XJ41 with more modern proportions. Jaguar management ultimately did not want to continue with the XJS platform and cancelled further work with the clay model only having the packaging and rough form complete.

Due to the development of the Jaguar XJ220, Ford had not been very keen on development of new Aston Martin models, considering high development costs and the market in the wake of the 1990s economic downturn. Aston Martin CEO at the time, Walter Hayes approached Walkinshaw as he had seen the potential in Walkinshaw's proposition to succeed. Development started with a project name of XX. Ian Callum was again tasked to redesign the car so it would look like an Aston Martin. Due to a limited financial backing at the time, the final product shared many components from other marques owned by Ford. The tail lights came from the Mazda 323 F, the exterior chrome door handles came from the Mazda 323 Estate, the side reflectors and interior door handles came from the Mazda MX-5, the front indicator lenses came from the Mazda MX-3 and the interior door mirror switches came from the Ford Scorpio. The only foreign component would be the wing mirrors which were shared with the Citroën CX. The whole project cost US$30 million.

These vehicles were fitted with the Tibbe disc tumbler lock barrel design as used on Ford vehicles around the time of this vehicle's manufacture. The difference between Ford locks and the ones fitted to the DB7 is the fact the DB7 utilises 8 discs rather than 6, hence the key blade and the lock barrel is longer. Jaguar vehicles also used the 8 disc Tibbe locks.

An alternate DB7 proposal was considered in 1991 to develop a 6-cylinder platform from the Escort RS Cosworth's 4x4 system.

On 1 January 1993, Jac Nasser was appointed the new chairman of Ford Europe. He presented the finished car, which had yet to be named, to the general public at the 1993 Geneva Motor Show. Due to the positive and overwhelming reception, the car was put into production as the Aston Martin DB7.

The positive response also prompted Jaguar to use the platform for the XJS' successor. The car was redesigned by Geoff Lawson and was launched in the market as the Jaguar XK which uses an evolution of the XJS platform (called the X100 by Jaguar) and the cars share a family resemblance, although the DB7 was more expensive than the XK.

The DB7 was engineered in Kidlington, Oxfordshire, by TWR on behalf of Aston Martin. The engines continued to be built in Kidlington during the production run of the vehicle.

With the production of the Virage (soon rechristened "V8" following Vantage styling revisions) continuing at Newport Pagnell, a new factory was acquired at Bloxham, Oxfordshire that had previously been used to manufacture the XJ220, where every DB7 would be built throughout its production run. The DB7 and its variants were the only Aston Martin automobiles produced in Bloxham and the only ones with a steel unit construction inherited from Jaguar (Aston Martin had traditionally used aluminium for construction of the bodies of their cars, and models introduced after the DB7 use aluminium for the chassis as well as for many major body parts).

The convertible Volante version was unveiled at the North American International Auto Show held in Detroit in 1996. Both versions initially had a supercharged straight-six engine that has a power output of 340 PS (250 kW; 335 hp) and 361 lb⋅ft (489 N⋅m) of torque. In the United States, the Coupé was sold for US$140,000, and the Volante for US$150,000. Works Service provided a special Driving Dynamics package, which greatly enhanced performance and handling for drivers who wanted more than what the standard configuration offered. The straight-6 models were phased out in mid-1999 due to lack of market interest.

Model	Years	Displacement	Gearbox	Peak power	Peak torque	Top speed	Acceleration time 0–100 km/h (0-62 mph)
DB7 I6	1994–1999	3,228 cc (197.0 cu in)	5-speed manual 4-speed automatic	340 PS (250 kW; 335 hp) at 5,500 rpm	361 lb⋅ft (489 N⋅m) at 3,000 rpm	266 km/h (165 mph) (manual); 257 km/h (160 mph) (automatic)	5.7 s (manual); 6.9 s (automatic); 6.4 s (automatic MY97)
DB7 I6 Volante	1996–1999	3,228 cc (197.0 cu in)	5-speed manual 4-speed automatic	340 PS (250 kW; 335 hp) at 5,500 rpm	361 lb⋅ft (489 N⋅m) at 3,000 rpm	249 km/h (155 mph)	6.0 s (manual); 6.6 s (automatic)
DB7 V12 Vantage	1999–2003	5,935 cc (362.2 cu in)	6-speed manual 5-speed automatic	426 PS (313 kW; 420 hp) at 6,000 rpm	400 lb⋅ft (542 N⋅m) at 5,000 rpm	296 km/h (184 mph) (manual); 266 km/h (165 mph) (automatic; limited)	5.0 s (manual); 5.1 s (automatic)
DB7 V12 Vantage Volante	1999–2003	5,935 cc (362.2 cu in)	6-speed manual 5-speed automatic	426 PS (313 kW; 420 hp) at 6,000 rpm	400 lb⋅ft (542 N⋅m) at 5,000 rpm	266 km/h (165 mph) (limited)	5.1 s (manual); 5.2 s (automatic)
DB7 V12 Vantage GT	2002–2003	5,935 cc (362.2 cu in)	6-speed manual	435 PS (320 kW; 429 hp) at 6,000 rpm	410 lb⋅ft (556 N⋅m) at 5,000 rpm	296 km/h (184 mph)	5.0 s
DB7 V12 Vantage GTA	2002–2003	5,935 cc (362.2 cu in)	5-speed automatic	426 PS (313 kW; 420 hp) at 6,000 rpm	400 lb⋅ft (542 N⋅m) at 5,000 rpm	266 km/h (165 mph) (limited)	5.1 s
DB7 Zagato; DB7 AR1	2003	5,935 cc (362.2 cu in)	6-speed manual	441 PS (324 kW; 435 hp) at 6,000 rpm	410 lb⋅ft (556 N⋅m) at 5,000 rpm	299 km/h (186 mph); 298 km/h (185 mph)	4.9 s

== Variants ==
=== V12 Vantage ===
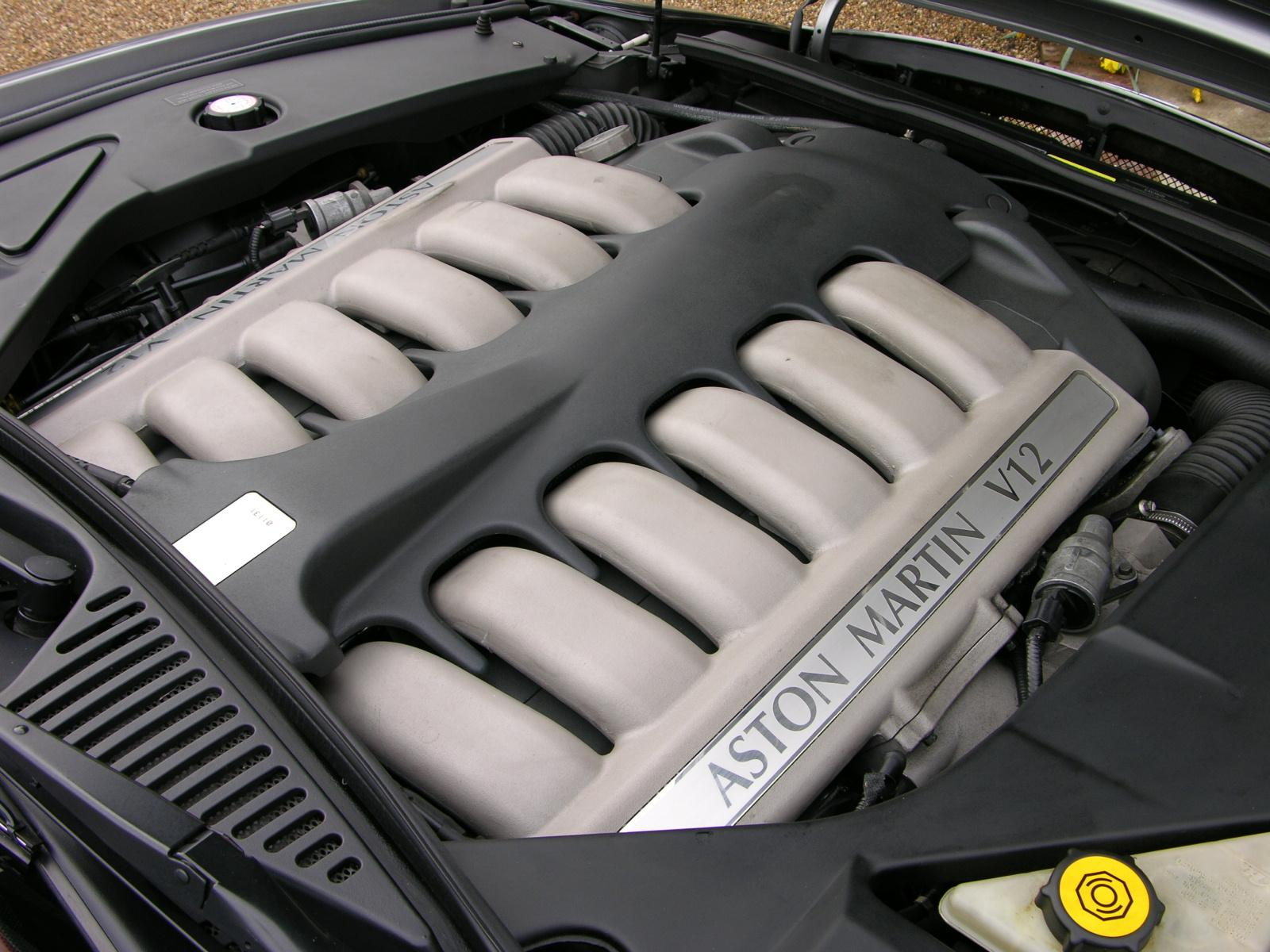
Vantage V12 engine

In 1999, the more powerful DB7 V12 Vantage was introduced at the Geneva Motor Show. Its 5.9-litre, 48-valve, Aston Martin V12 engine has a power output of 426 PS (313 kW; 420 hp) and 400 lb⋅ft (542 N⋅m) of torque. It has a compression ratio of 10.3:1. Two transmission choices were available, those being a TREMEC T-56 six-speed manual or a ZF 5HP30 five-speed automatic. Aston Martin claimed the car had a top speed of either 299 km/h (186 mph) with the manual gearbox or 266 km/h (165 mph) with the automatic gearbox, and could accelerate from 0–97 km/h (60 mph) in 4.9 seconds. The V12 Vantage is 4,692 mm (184.7 in) long, 1,830 mm (72.0 in) wide, 1,243 mm (48.9 in) high, with a weight of 1,800 kg (3,968.3 lb). Aesthetic differences from the straight-6 DB7 include different wing mirrors and large fog lamps under the headlamps along with "DB7 Vantage" badging at the rear.

After the launch of the Vantage, sales of the base DB7 with the supercharged straight-6 engine had reduced considerably so its production ended by mid-1999.

=== V12 GT and GTA ===
In 2002, a new variant was launched, named V12 GT or V12 GTA when equipped with an automatic transmission (the A referring to the automatic transmission itself). It was essentially an improved version of the Vantage, with its V12 engine now having a power output of 441 PS (324 kW; 435 hp) and 410 lb⋅ft (556 N⋅m) of torque for the manual GT, although the GTA retained the engine having a power output of 426 PS (313 kW; 420 hp) and 400 lb⋅ft (542 N⋅m) of torque of the standard DB7 Vantage. The DB7 GT also received a shorter final drive ratio (4.09 for the DB7 GT compared to 3.77 for the manual DB7 Vantage). This resulted in dramatically improved mid-range performance and defined the different character of the DB7 GT compared to the DB7 Vantage (see table below). Additionally, the GT and GTA chassis had substantially updated suspension from the DB7 Vantage models. Aesthetically, compared to the Vantage it has a mesh front grille, vents in the bonnet (hood), a boot (trunk) spoiler, an aluminium gear lever, optional carbon fibre interior trim and new wheels. It also has 355 mm (14.0 in) front and 330 mm (13.0 in) rear vented disc brakes made by Brembo. When being tested by Jeremy Clarkson on Top Gear in 2003, he demonstrated the car's ability to pull away in fourth gear and continue until it hit the rev limiter: the speedometer indicated 217 km/h (135 mph). Production of the GT and GTA was extremely limited, as only 190 GTs and 112 GTAs were produced worldwide and only 64 GTs and 17 GTAs were shipped to the US market, out of a total of 302 cars.

In-gear acceleration (manual)		DB7 Vantage	DB7 GT
30–70 mph (48–113 Km/h)	Through the gears	4.8 s	4.0 s
50–70 mph (80–113 Km/h)	3rd gear	3.5 s	2.2 s
50–70 mph (80–113 Km/h)	4th gear	4.2 s	3.5 s
50–70 mph (80–113 Km/h)	6th gear	7.6 s	6.7 s

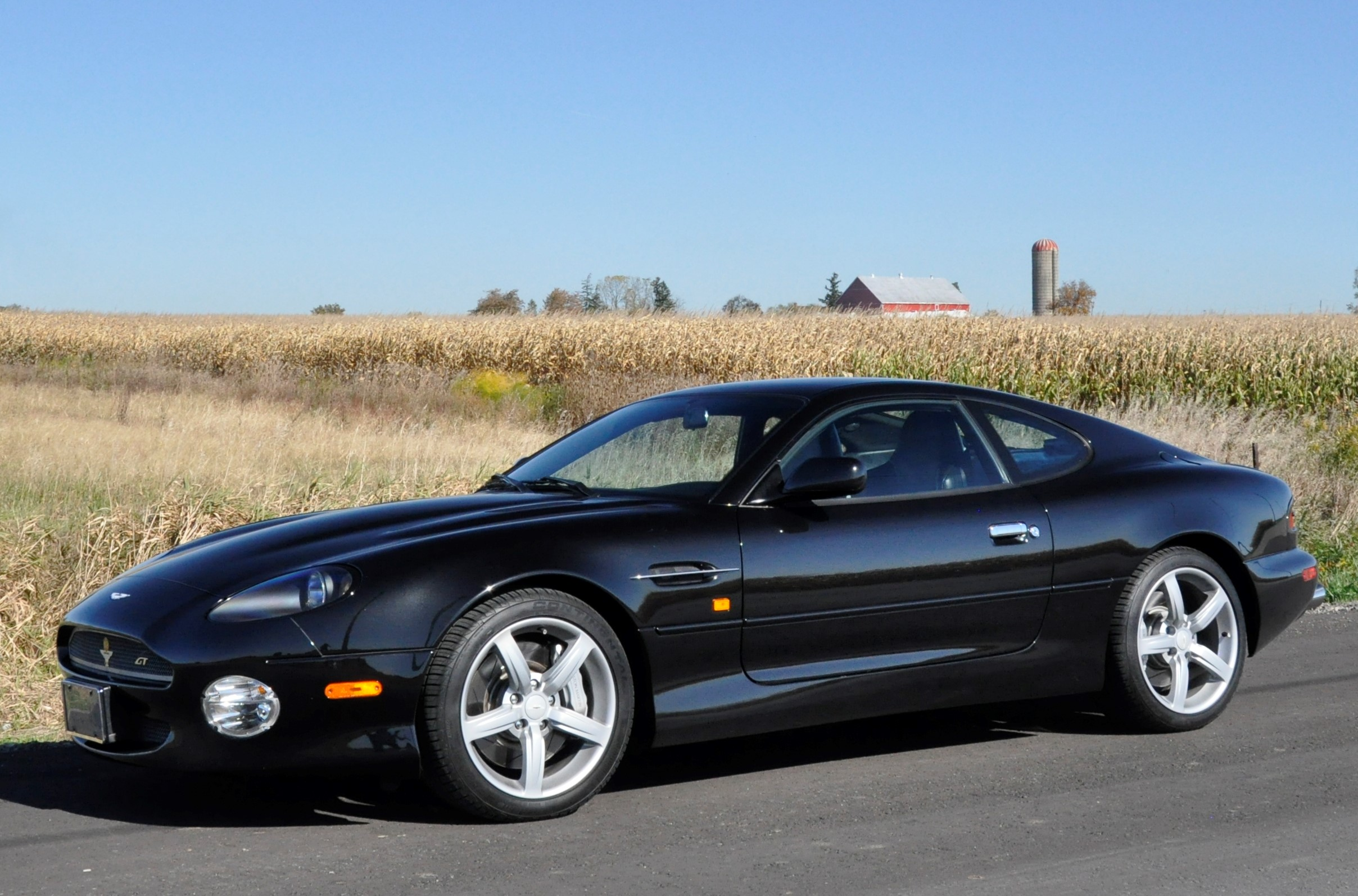
2003 Aston Martin DB7 GT

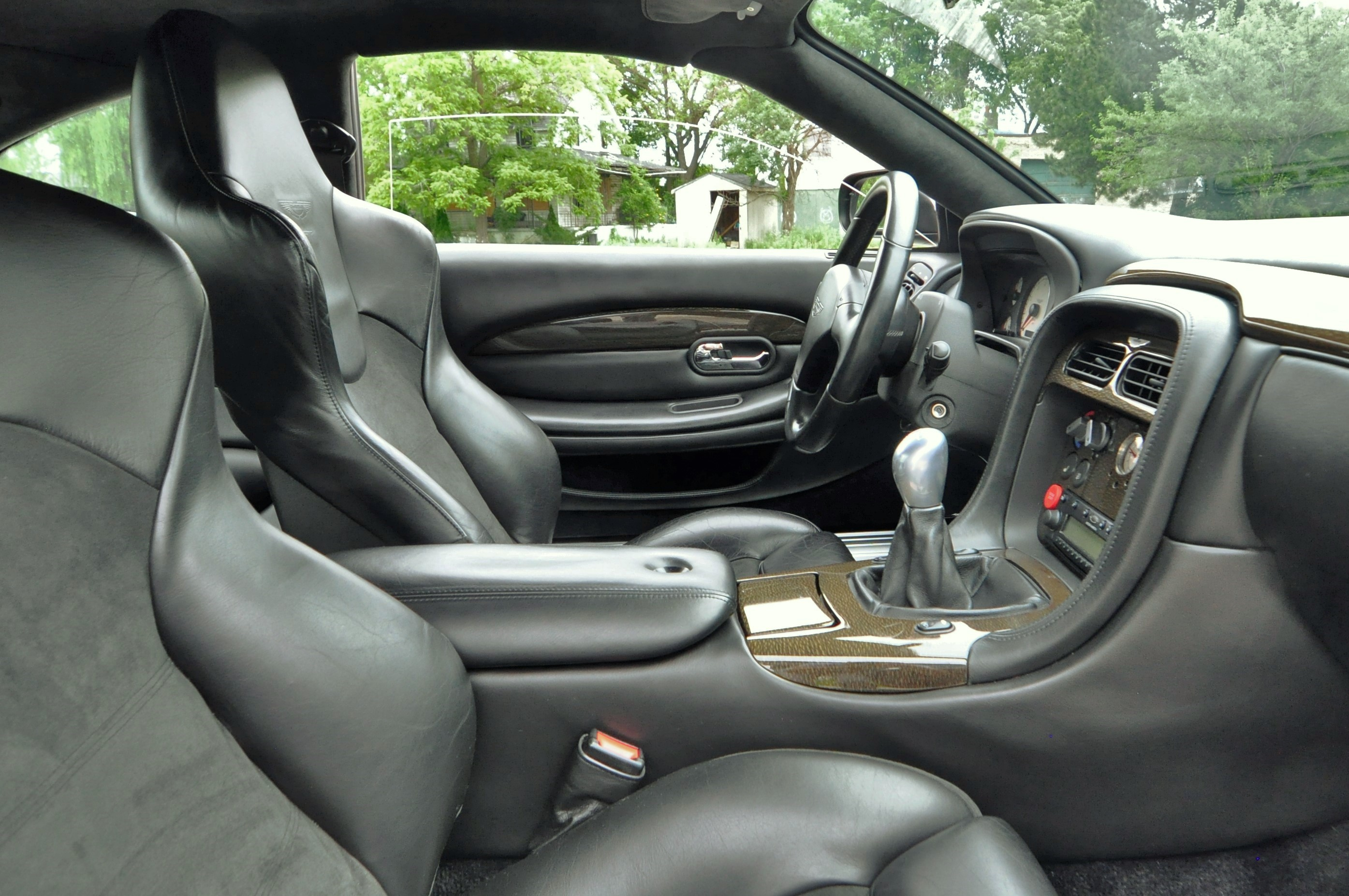
Interior. Note the black oak wood, unique to the GT.

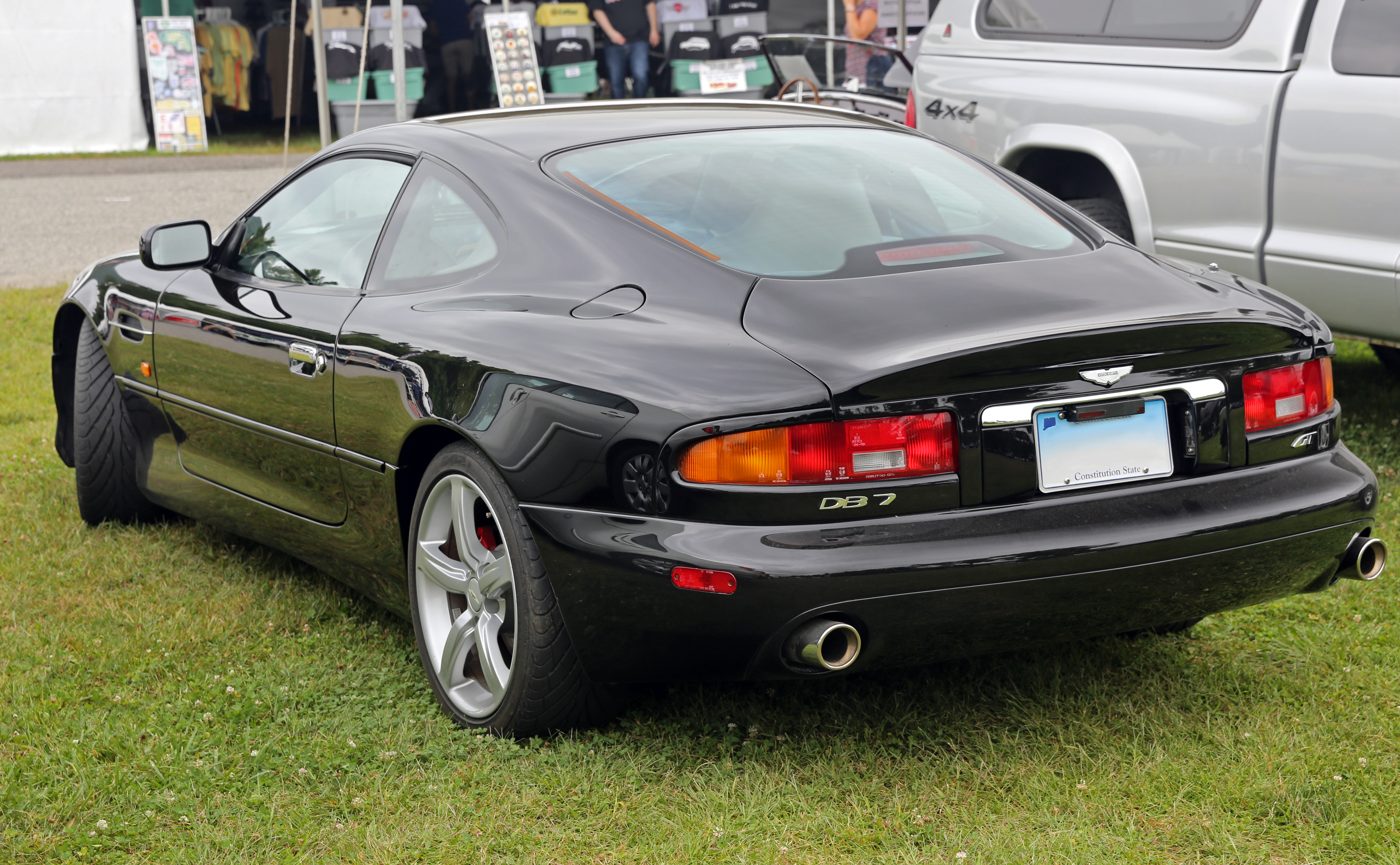
Rear 3/4 view, showing the GT-only rear spoiler

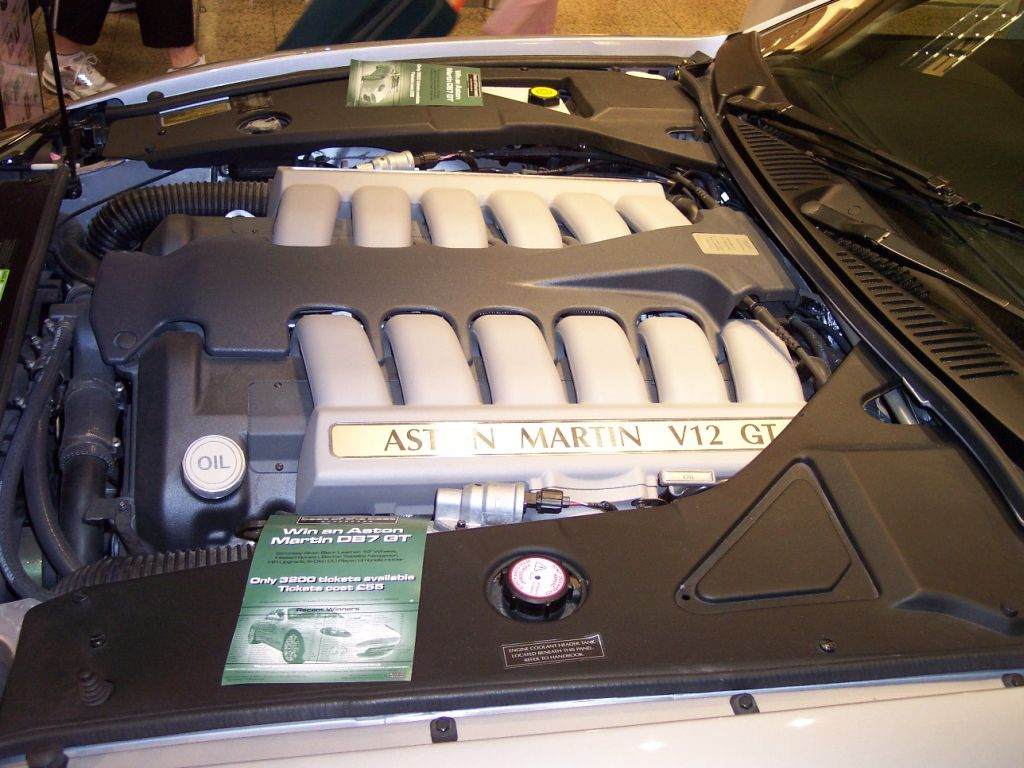
Engine

== Special editions ==
A number of special-edition DB7 cars were built:

- DB7 I6
  - 1998 Alfred Dunhill Edition – 78 (of an announced 150) "Dunhill Silver platinum metallic" cars with a built-in humidor
  - 1998 Neiman-Marcus Edition – 10 "Jet Black" cars for the 1998 Neiman Marcus Christmas catalogue
  - 1999 Stratstone Edition – 19 "Bowland Black" cars, 9 coupes and 10 Volantes
  - 1998 Beverly Hills Edition – 6 "Midnight Blue", 2 coupes and 4 Volantes
- DB7 V12 Vantage
  - 2003 Jubilee Limited Edition – 24 "Jubilee Blue" cars were made for Europe and 26 were made for North America to celebrate the Golden Jubilee of Queen Elizabeth II
  - 2002 Keswick Limited Edition – 10 "Ferrari Nero Daytona Black", 5 coupes and 5 Volantes
  - 2003 Anniversary Edition – 55 (of an announced 100) "Slate Blue" cars to celebrate the end of DB7 Vantage production

== Special models ==
Two special edition variants were made at the end of the DB7's production run, the DB7 Zagato and DB AR1.

=== DB7 Zagato ===
DB7 Zagato

The DB7 Zagato was introduced at the Pebble Beach Concours d'Elegance in August 2002 and later shown at the Paris Motor Show the following October.

It was only offered for the 2003 model year, with a limited run of 99 cars built (a 100th car was produced for the Aston Martin museum), all of which immediately sold out. The car has a steel body designed in collaboration between Andrea Zagato at Zagato and the then chief designer of Aston Martin Henrik Fisker and features the signature 'double-bubble' Zagato roofline. Other features include a unique Analine leather interior not found on the normal DB7 and Zagato styled five-spoke alloy wheels. The car was only available in the UK, Europe and Southeast Asia.

Like the DB7 Vantage on which it is based, the DB7 Zagato is powered by a 6.0 L V12 engine that has been tuned to now produce 441 PS (324 kW; 435 hp) at 6,000 rpm and 410 lb⋅ft (556 N⋅m) of torque at 5,000 rpm. Power goes to the rear wheels via a 6-speed manual transmission or an optional 5-speed automatic. It featured upgraded suspension and brakes as well It has a top speed of 186 mph (299 km/h) and a 0–60 mph acceleration time of 4.9 seconds.

Unlike the later DB AR1, the Zagato is built on a shortened chassis that has a 60 mm (2 in) shorter wheelbase and is 211 mm (8 in) shorter overall. It is also approximately 130 lb (59 kg) lighter than the standard DB7.

=== DB AR1 ===
DB AR1

The DB AR1 (standing for American Roadster 1) was introduced at the Los Angeles Auto Show in January 2003. It is based on the DB7 Vantage Volante and features a unique body designed by Zagato in collaboration with Henrik Fisker that is very similar to the previous coupé variant, but retaining a full-length chassis. Only 99 examples were produced for sale, though Aston Martin built one additional example for their own factory collection. They were only offered for the U.S. market. The AR1 was intended for sunny American states and as such had no roof of any kind. Collectors elsewhere in the world have attempted to remedy this, but long-time DB AR1 owner Robert Stockman commissioned Zagato to construct a small folding convertible top. The resulting electrically operated unit is very slight, referred to as a "shelter" rather than a roof by Andrea Zagato, and hides behind the seats when not in use.

The DB AR1 uses the 5.9 litre, 48-valve, V12 engine from the DB7 producing 435 bhp (324 kW; 441 PS) at 6000 rpm and 410 lb⋅ft (556 N⋅m) of torque at 5000 rpm. It has a top speed of 185 mph (298 km/h) and a 0–60 mph (97 km/h) acceleration time of 4.9 seconds.

== One-offs ==
=== DB7 i6 GT Competition Prototypes ===
Aston Martin planned on a gentleman's racer programme featuring the DB7. For this purpose, Prodrive was commissioned to create a racing DB7 based on the first DB7 production car. This car features a red noseband. A second car, built by Works Service, followed and had a yellow noseband. The plans for the racing series were cancelled.

=== DB7 V8 road car by Works Service ===
In 1998, Works Service was given the task of supplying a DB7 powered by the famous V8. To make things more interesting, Works Service opted to use the 6.3 litre variant as also seen in the Virage 6.3. Unique features to distinguish this car include twin power bulges on the bonnet including brass coloured mesh grilles for additional cooling.

=== DB7 V12 prototype by TWR ===
TWR owner Tom Walkinshaw commissioned a one-off model in 1996 for his ownership based on the Aston Martin DB7. The car was fitted with a 6.4-litre Jaguar-TWR V12 engine based on a 6.0-litre V12 engine. The engine had a revised steel crankshaft and specially designed four-valves per cylinder heads. The twin cam-shafts worked by a unique chain drive mechanism. The engine has a claimed power output of 482 PS (355 kW; 475 hp) at 6,000 rpm and 637 N⋅m (470 lb⋅ft) of torque at 4,500 rpm.

Power was transferred to the rear wheels by an AP racing twin-plate clutch and the engine was mated to a 6-speed Borg Warner T-56 manual transmission. The car had an estimated top speed of 293 km/h (182 mph) due to a longer final gear ratio. On the exterior, the car had a specially designed body kit and a rear spoiler for improved downforce. The car was fitted with wider Yokohama tyres for enhanced grip and to handle the power of the engine and had specially designed 20-spoke alloy wheels.

== Concept car ==
=== Twenty Twenty ===
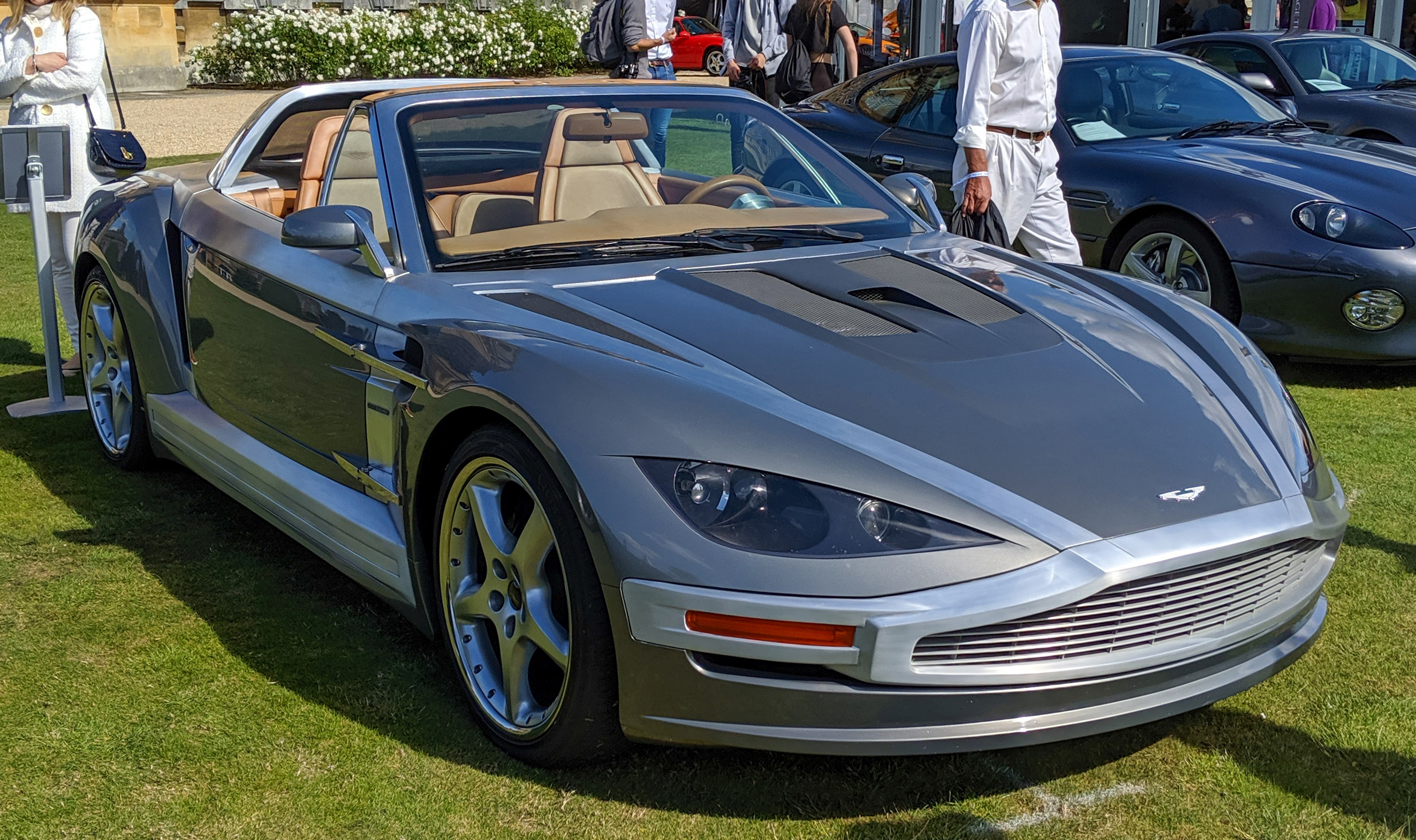
Aston Martin Twenty Twenty Concept

During the 2001 Geneva Motor Show, Italdesign presented an open-top concept car based on the DB7 mechanicals. The Aston Martin Twenty Twenty was designed in such a way as to overlay the structural extruded aluminium panels and beams over the car's carbon and plastic bodywork. The name 'Twenty Twenty' was meant to invoke a futuristic design intended for the year 2020. Two front seats were protected by a roll-over hoop, behind which two smaller seats were hidden by a tonneau cover. Both Giorgetto Giugiaro and his son Fabrizio were responsible for the design work. The working concept car was powered by a 5.9-litre V12 engine, claimed to be uprated to 500 PS.
