= Jaguar XJ220 =

Mid-engine sports car manufactured by Jaguar

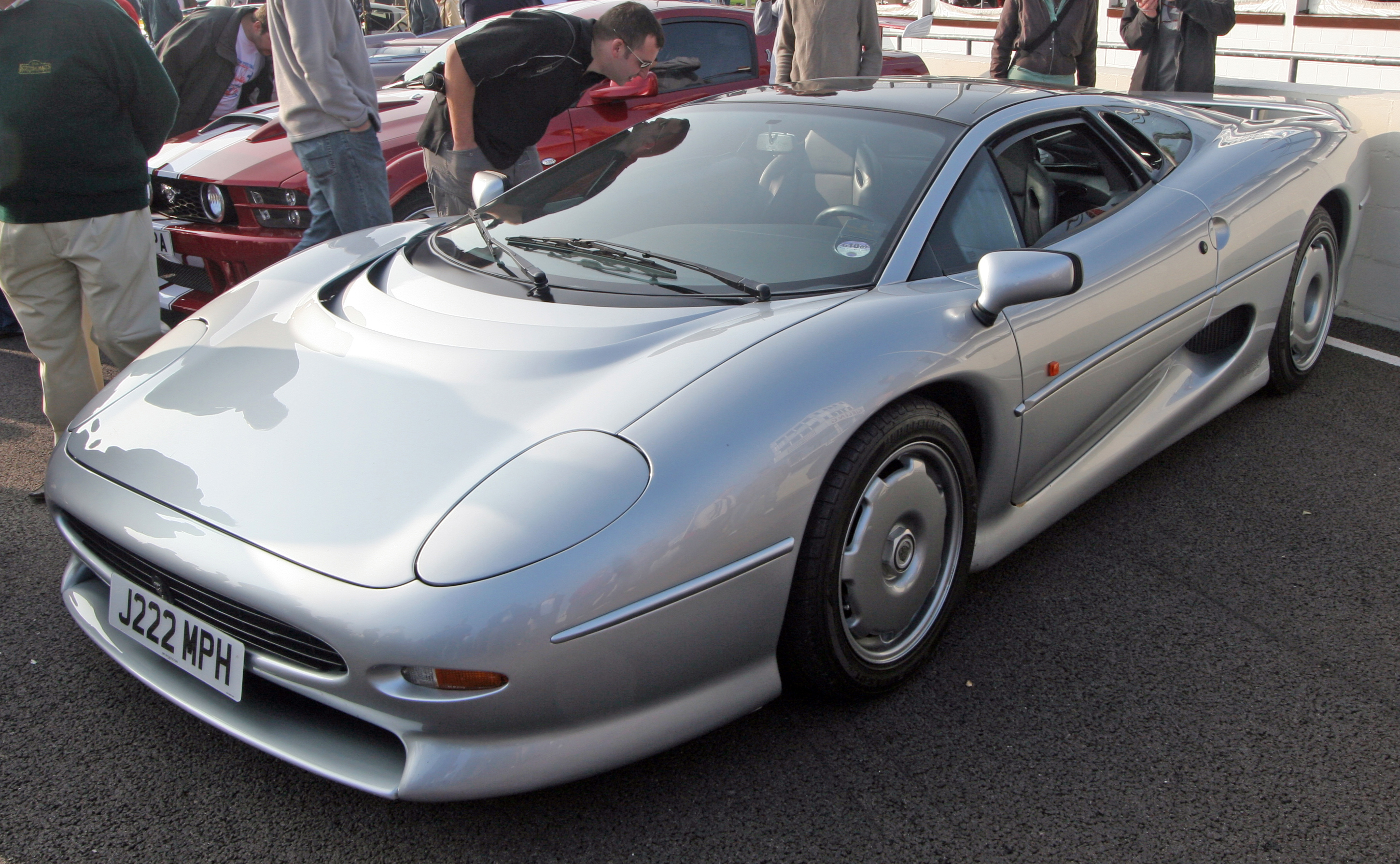

Overview
- Manufacturer: JaguarSport (Jaguar/TWR joint venture)
- Production: 1992–1994; 282 produced
- Assembly: United Kingdom: Bloxham, Oxfordshire
- Designer: Keith Helfet under Jim Randle

Body and chassis
- Class: Sports car (S)
- Body style: 2-door coupé
- Layout: Rear mid-engine, all-wheel-drive (concept); Rear mid-engine, rear-wheel-drive (production version)

Powertrain
- Engine: 6.2 L (6,222 cc) Jaguar V12 (concept); 3.5 L (3,498 cc) twin-turbocharged Jaguar JRV-6 V6 (production version)
- Power output: 500 hp; 373 kW (507 PS) 400 lb⋅ft (542 N⋅m) (concept); 542 hp; 405 kW (550 PS) 475 lb⋅ft (644 N⋅m) (production version)
- Transmission: 5-speed manual

Dimensions
- Wheelbase: 2,640 mm (103.9 in)
- Length: 4,930 mm (194.1 in)
- Width: 2,009 mm (79.1 in) (excluding wing mirrors)
- Height: 1,150 mm (45.3 in)
- Kerb weight: 1,470 kg (3,240.8 lb)

Chronology
- Predecessor: Jaguar XJR-15
- Successor: Jaguar C-X75 (spiritual)

The Jaguar XJ220 is a two-seat supercar produced by British luxury car manufacturer Jaguar from 1992 until 1994, in collaboration with the specialist automotive and race engineering company Tom Walkinshaw Racing. The XJ220 (with catalytic converter removed) recorded a top speed of 217 mph (349 km/h) during testing by Jaguar at the Nardo test track in Italy. This made it the fastest production car from 1992 to 1993. According to Jaguar, an XJ220 prototype managed a Nürburgring lap time of 7:46.36 in 1991 which was faster than any production car lap time before it.

The XJ220 was developed from a V12-engined 4-wheel drive concept car designed by an informal group of Jaguar employees working in their spare time. The group wished to create a modern version of the successful Jaguar 24 Hours of Le Mans racing cars of the 1950s and 1960s that could be entered into FIA Group B competitions. The XJ220 made use of engineering work undertaken for Jaguar's then current racing car family.

The initial XJ220 concept car was unveiled to the public at the 1988 British International Motor Show, held in Birmingham, England. Its positive reception prompted Jaguar to put the car into production. Approximately 281 deposits of £50,000 each were taken and deliveries were planned for 1992.

Engineering and emissions requirements resulted in significant changes to the specification of the XJ220, most notably the replacement of the Jaguar V12 engine by a turbocharged V6 engine. The changes to the specification and a collapse in the demand of high performance cars brought about by the early 1990s recession resulted in many buyers choosing not to exercise their purchase options. A total of just 275 cars were produced by the time production ended, each with a retail price of £470,000 in 1992, making it one of the most expensive cars at that time.

== Conception ==
Racing team owner Tom Walkinshaw approached Jaguar executives and encouraged the company to enter the XJS into the 1981 European Touring Car Championship. The partnership succeeded in winning the competition in 1983. Jaguar had started to provide factory support to racing team Group 44 Racing, who were using the Jaguar-engined XJR-5 in the IMSA GT Championship, supplying V12 engines from 1983 onwards and supporting a Le Mans entry in 1984. Tom Walkinshaw and Jaguar agreed to enter the FIA Group C World Sportscar Championship and developed the XJR-6, which was powered by the same Jaguar V12 engine used by Group 44 Racing. The car was launched during the 1985 season.

TWR took over the IMSA GT Championship operation in 1988 and one model – XJR-9 – was launched to compete in both series. The XJR-9, which retained the Jaguar V12 engine, went on to win the 1988 24 Hours of Le Mans and World Sportscar Championship in the same year. The poor fuel consumption of the Jaguar V12 combined with new rules restricting refueling during races, forced the replacement of the V12 engine in the successors to the XJR-9, the XJR-10 and XJR-11. The normally aspirated Austin Rover V64V engine, designed for the MG Metro 6R4 had recently been made redundant due to the Group B rally ban in 1987 and the design rights were for sale. The compact, lightweight and fuel efficient nature of the small-displacement, turbocharged engine was investigated by TWR. They considered it an ideal basis for a new engine to power the XJR-10 and purchased the design rights from Austin Rover Group.

Jaguar and their Director of Engineering, Jim Randle, felt these racing cars were too far removed from the product available to the general public, especially with the rule changes that mandated the replacement of the Jaguar V12 engine in the forthcoming XJR-10 and XJR-11 racing cars. Therefore, a project was initiated to design and build a car capable of winning Le Mans "in house", just as the C-Type and D-Type had done. The groundwork for the project was undertaken by Randle over Christmas 1987, when he produced a 1:4 scale cardboard model of a potential Group B racing car.

The cardboard model was taken into the Jaguar styling studio and two mock-ups were produced. One was said to be reminiscent of the Porsche 956, the other took elements of the then current XJ41 project and Malcolm Sayer's work on the stillborn XJ13 racing car. The second design, by Keith Helfet, was chosen as it was "more obviously Jaguar in its look".

The project still had no official support, leaving Randle no option but to put together a team of volunteers to work evenings and weekends in their own time. The team came to be known as "The Saturday Club" and consisted of twelve volunteers. To justify the resources consumed by the project, the XJ220 needed to provide meaningful data to the engineers on handling, aerodynamics – particularly at high speeds – and aluminium structures. These requirements, together with FIA racing regulations and various government regulations governing car design and safety, influenced the overall design and engineering direction of the car.

== Concept car ==
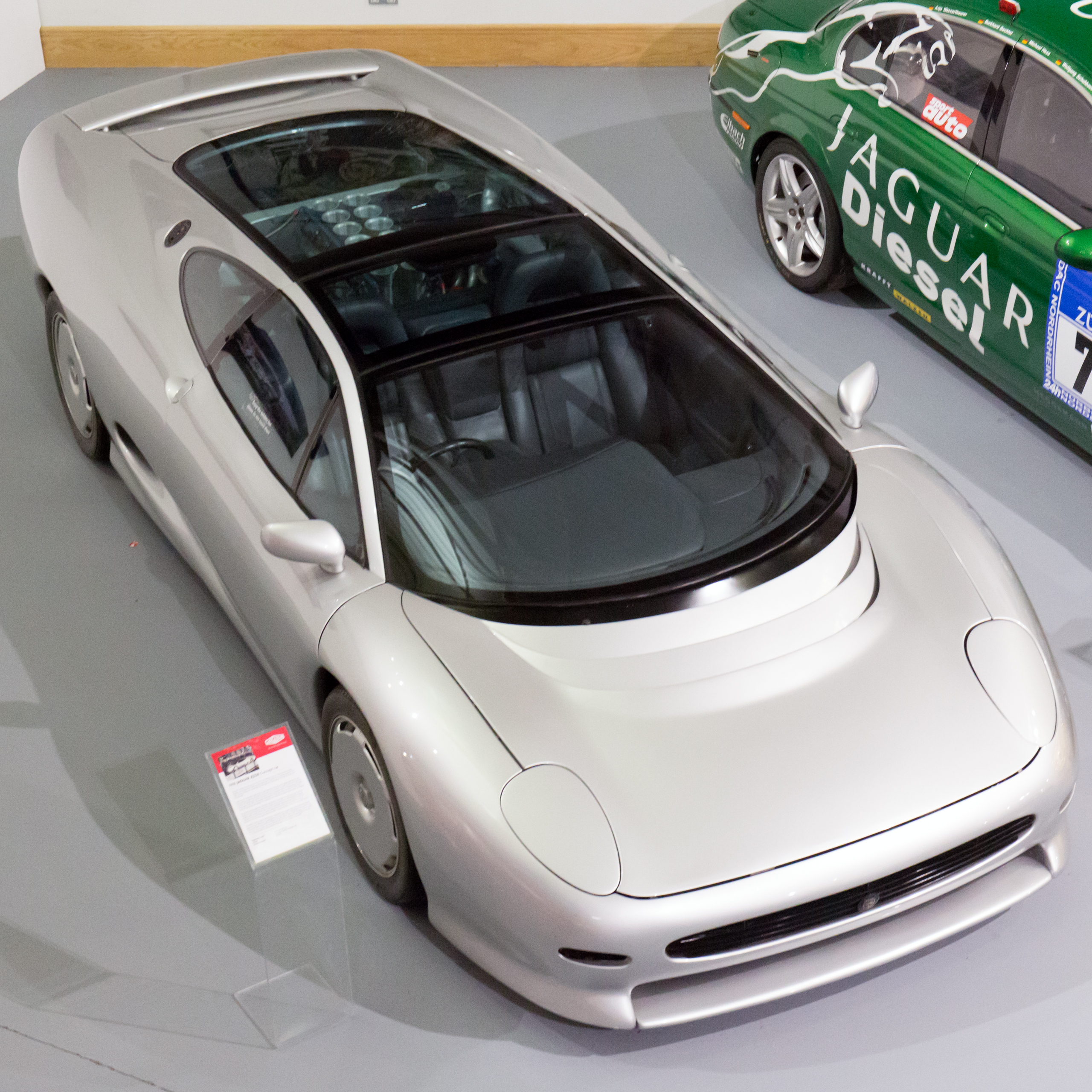
Jaguar XJ220 concept car featuring the V12 engine at the British Motor Museum, Gaydon

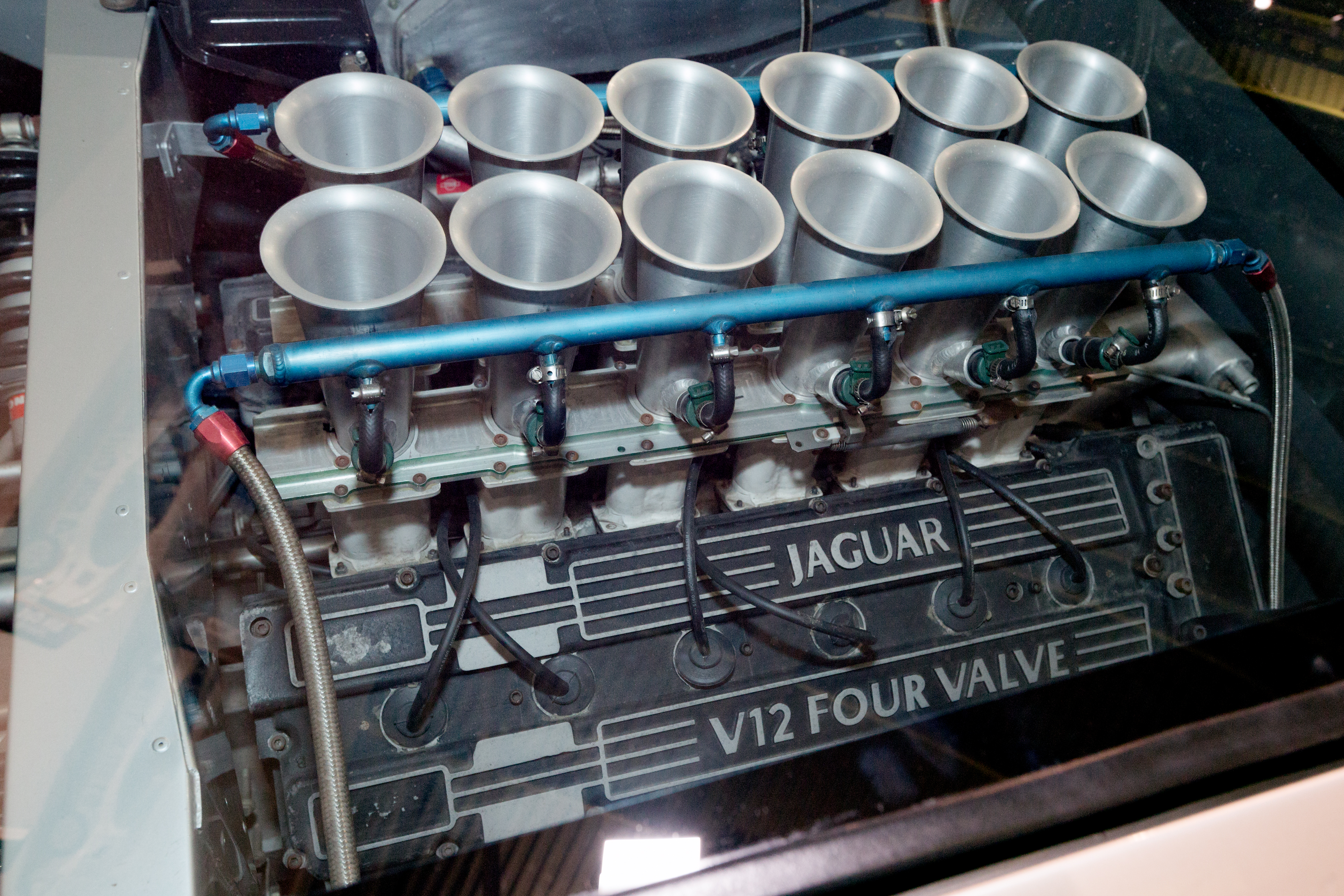
The Four-Valve Jaguar V12 engine in the XJ220 concept

The FIA Group B regulations steered the concept towards a mid-engine, all-wheel-drive layout, with a Jaguar V12 engine as the power source. The concept car was designed and built at very little cost to Jaguar, as Randle called in favours from component suppliers and engineering companies he and Jaguar had worked with in the past. In return he offered public recognition for their assistance and dangled the possibility of future contracts from Jaguar.

The name XJ220 was chosen as a continuation of the naming of the XK120, which referred to the top speed of the model in miles per hour. The concept car had a targeted top speed of 220 mph (350 km/h) so the name became XJ220. The XJ220, like the XK120, was an aluminium-bodied sports car and when launched was the fastest production car in the world.

=== Engine and transmission ===
Jaguar's engine designer Walter Hassan had previously developed a 48-valve variant of their V12 engine specifically for motorsport use. It featured a double overhead camshaft layout with four valves per cylinder, compared with the single overhead camshaft and two valves per cylinder of the production engine, which was used in the XJ and XJS models at the time.

TWR had manufactured a number of these racing V12 engines during the 1980s and they had been raced competitively, with a 7-litre version of this engine featuring in the Le Mans-winning XJR-9. Five of these engines still existed, all of which were fitted with dry sump lubrication. One of five of these engines was chosen and considered to be especially useful as the dry sump would lower the vehicle's centre of gravity. The displacement of the V12 was set at 6.2 litres (6,222 cc) for the XJ220. The engine fitted to the XJ220 concept had titanium connecting rods.

Jaguar had little experience with four-wheel drive systems at the time, having previously only produced rear-wheel drive cars. Randle approached Tony Rolt's company, FF Developments to design the transmission and four-wheel drive system for the XJ220, with Rolt's son Stuart running the project. Tony Rolt was the Technical Director of Ferguson Research, where he was heavily involved in the design of the four-wheel drive system used in the Jensen FF, the first sports car to be fitted with such a system. Tony Rolt also had a long involvement with Jaguar, winning the 1953 24 Hours of Le Mans with the factory works team driving the C-Type.

The mid-mounted engine complicated the design of the four-wheel drive system and an innovative solution was needed to get power from the mid-mounted rear engine to the front wheels. The chosen design took the front-wheel drive from the central differential on the rear transaxle and sent it through the V in the centre of the engine using a quill drive, before joining an inverted differential. The clutch was a twin-plate unit designed by AP Racing.

=== Bodywork and interior ===
The design brief for the exterior restricted the use of aerodynamic aids and aimed for a simple yet clean and functional body similar to classic Jaguar sports cars, such as the D-Type and E-Type. Drag and lift were limited at the envisioned ground clearance for road use, but the design allowed for additional downforce when the car was set up for racing. The body produced around 3,000 lb (1,400 kg) of downforce at 200 mph (322 km/h). The design was also intended to have a variable rear wing that folded into the bodywork at lower speeds. Aerodynamic work was undertaken at the Motor Industry Research Association wind tunnel using a 1:4 scale model, as the project was unable to budget for a full-scale mock-up.

The bodywork for the concept car displayed in 1988 was hand built from aluminium by Park Sheet Metal, a specialist automotive engineering company that manufactures concept cars and low-volume niche models for various manufacturers, including Bentley. QCR Motors LTD undertook final painting of the body in silver. The concept also featured electrically operated scissor doors and a transparent engine cover to show off the V12 engine.

The concept car had a Connolly Leather-trimmed interior trimmed by Callow & Maddox and was fitted with front and rear heated windscreens, electric windows, air conditioning, heated electrically adjustable seats and an Alpine CD player. The dashboard was supplied by Veglia.

=== Chassis ===
The chassis was manufactured from aluminium using Alcan's bonded aluminium structure vehicle technology (ASVT) and had a wheelbase of 2,845 mm (112 in). The design for the chassis featured rear wheel steering and packaged the fuel tank behind the centre bulkhead. Suspension design largely focused on road use, but a good compromise for racing use was achieved and the suspension height was adjustable. The concept car was fitted with a four-channel anti-lock braking system.

The concept car was larger than the production model at 5,140 mm (202 in) in length and was 2,000 mm (79 in) wide. It weighed 1,560 kg (3,439 lb).

=== Launch ===
The concept car was completed in the early hours of 18 October 1988, the day it was due to be unveiled at the British International Motor Show, being held at the National Exhibition Centre, Birmingham. The vehicle was completed at 03:00 GMT, moved to Jaguar's stand at 06:00 GMT and unveiled at 11:00 GMT.

Jaguar's marketing department had allocated space on their stand at the motor show for the XJ220, but had not seen the vehicle until its arrival. Jaguar chairman John Egan and Roger Putnam, who was in charge of Jaguar's racing activities, were shown the vehicle the week before the motor show and signed off on the concept, allowing its unveiling. The car received an overwhelmingly positive reception by public and press and a number of wealthy Jaguar enthusiasts handed over blank cheques to secure a purchase option should the XJ220 concept go into production. Ferrari's display of their F40 flagship model at the same event was overshadowed, as an estimated 90,000 additional visitors came to see the XJ220.

The XJ220 was not initially intended to be a production car, but following the reception of the concept and financial interest from serious buyers, a feasibility study was carried out by teams from TWR and Jaguar. The conclusion was that such a car would be technically feasible (subject to engineering changes) and that it would be financially viable. The announcement of a limited production run of 220 to 350 cars was made on 20 December 1989. The list price on 1 January 1990 was £290,000 exclusive of value-added tax (VAT), options and delivery charges, but by 1992 that had increased considerably owing to indexation of contracts. Deposits of £50,000 exclusive of (VAT) were taken from around 281 customers. First deliveries were planned for mid-1992.

== Production version ==
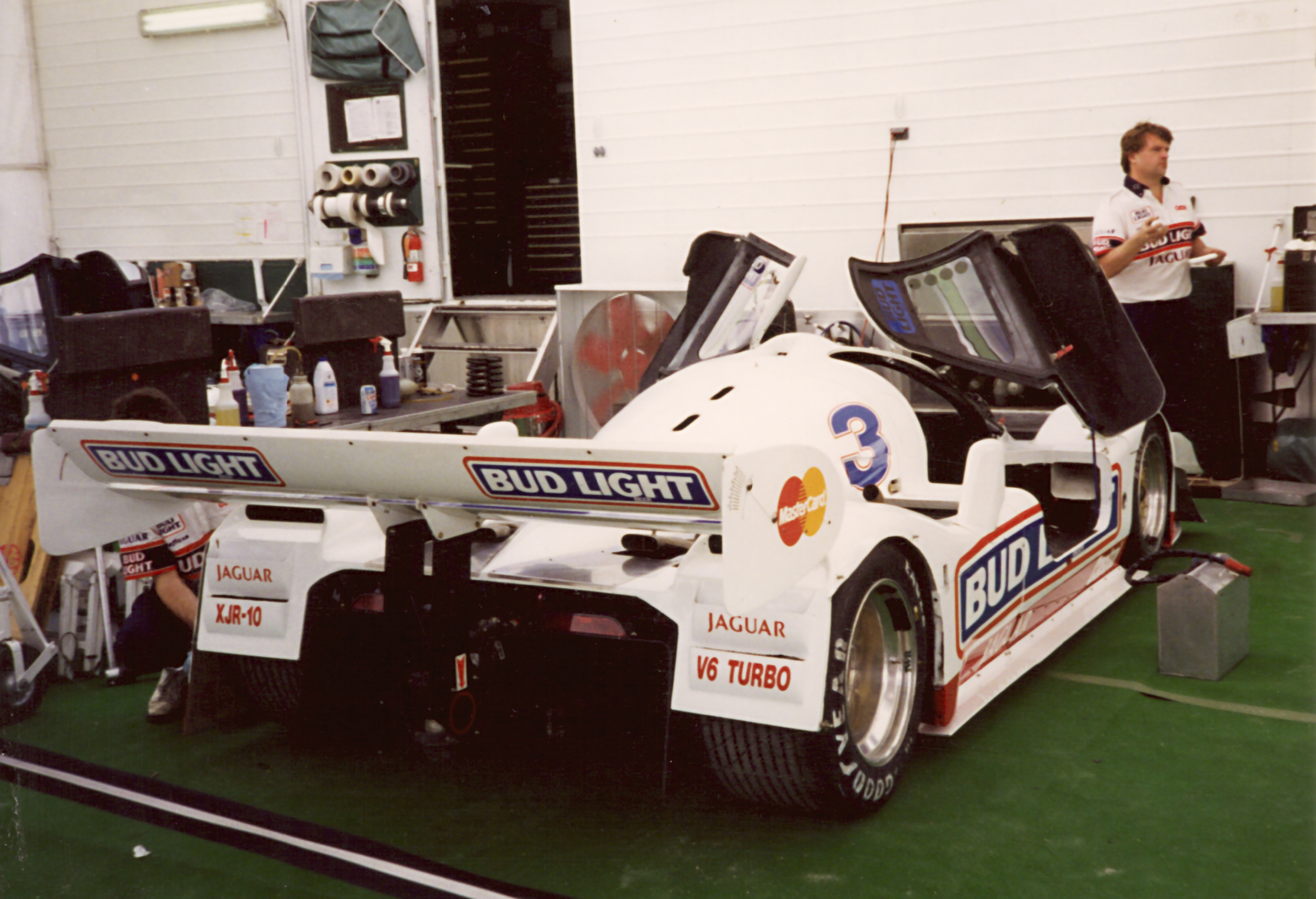
The XJ220 used a road-legal version of the turbocharged V6 racing engine used in the XJR-10 (pictured) and XJR-11 race cars

Jaguar were unable to develop the XJ220 in-house as the available engineering resources were committed to working on the XJ and XJS models. Jaguar and TWR had an existing joint venture, JaguarSport Ltd. formed in 1987 to produce racing cars. Jaguar's board made the decision that subject to contractual agreement, TWR and JaguarSport would be responsible for the XJ220. JaguarSport formed a new company, Project XJ220 Ltd., specifically to develop and build the XJ220.

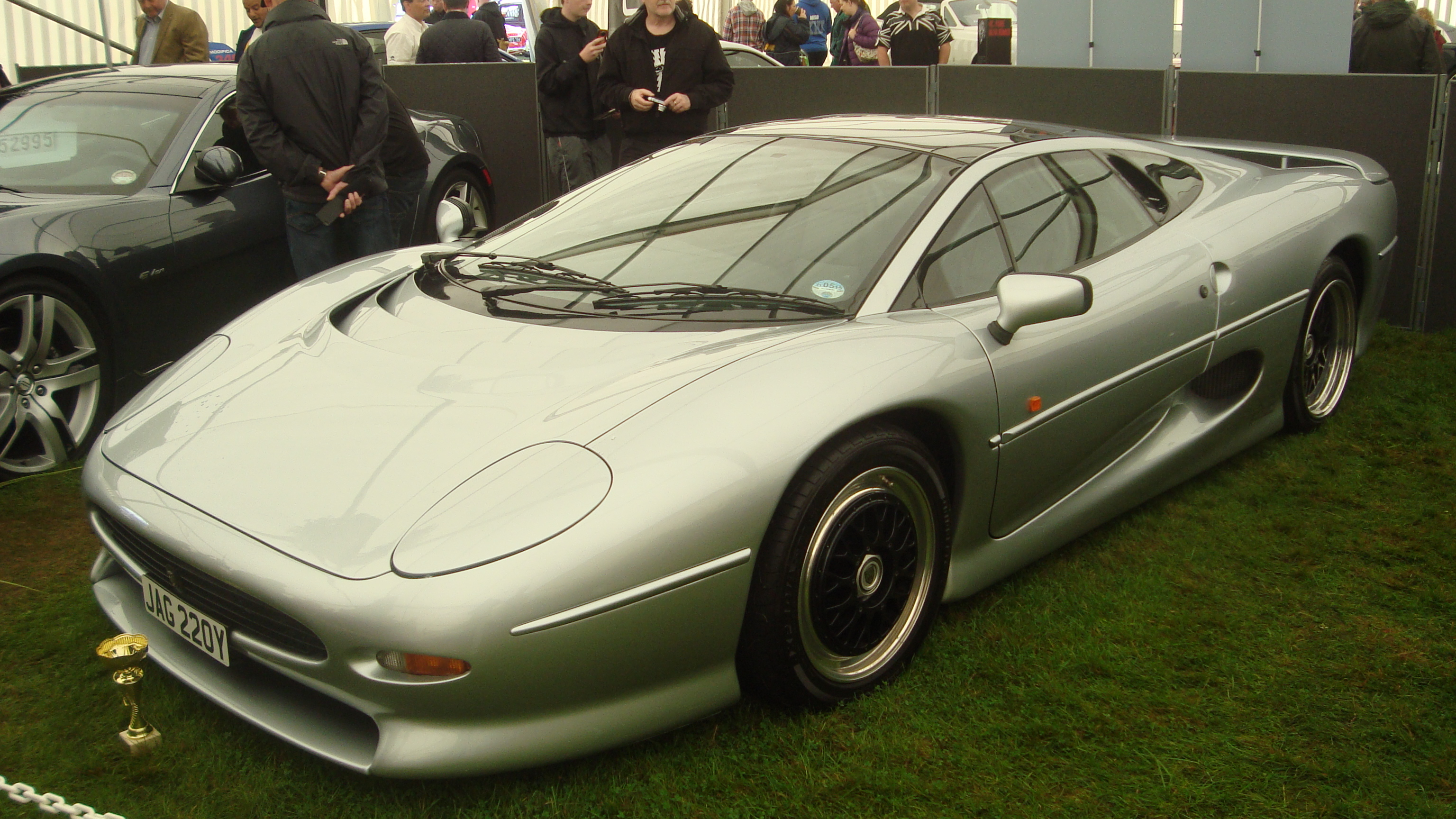
Jaguar XJ220 with aftermarket wheels

The team that would determine the necessary engineering work and assess the car's financial viability was put in place during mid-1989, working from the TWR workshops. Mike Moreton headed the team, joining TWR to run the XJ220 project. Moreton came from Ford Motorsport where he led the team responsible for the Ford Sierra RS500 Cosworth, and was a project manager for the Ford RS200 Group B rally car program. Richard Owen was appointed chief designer and the remainder of the team was made up of Jaguar and TWR staff, including Pete Dodd, the only member of the group of twelve responsible for the XJ220 concept. The exterior and interior designers who had worked on the XJ220 prototype, Keith Helfet and Nick Hull, rejoined the project when it became clear that more design work would be needed.

=== Development ===
The development team looked at the two principal competitors, the Ferrari F40 and the Porsche 959. These were powered by compact, lightweight engines; both the Ferrari and the Porsche used forced induction to obtain high power outputs from small-displacement engines. Ferrari used a 2.9-litre (180 cu in) twin-turbocharged V8 engine that was rated at 352 kW; 471 hp (478 PS) whilst Porsche used a 2.9-litre (180 cu in) twin-turbocharged flat-six engine rated at 331 kW; 444 hp (450 PS), resulting in cars that were significantly lighter and smaller than the XJ220 concept: the Ferrari was lighter by 600 kg (1,323 lb) and 710 mm (28 in) shorter, whilst the Porsche was 250 kg (551 lb) lighter and 870 mm (34 in) shorter. The Porsche's specifications were closer to the Jaguar's, with all-wheel drive and a luxurious interior. By comparison, the rear-wheel drive Ferrari had a very basic interior, with no carpets, door handles or a stereo.

=== Engine ===
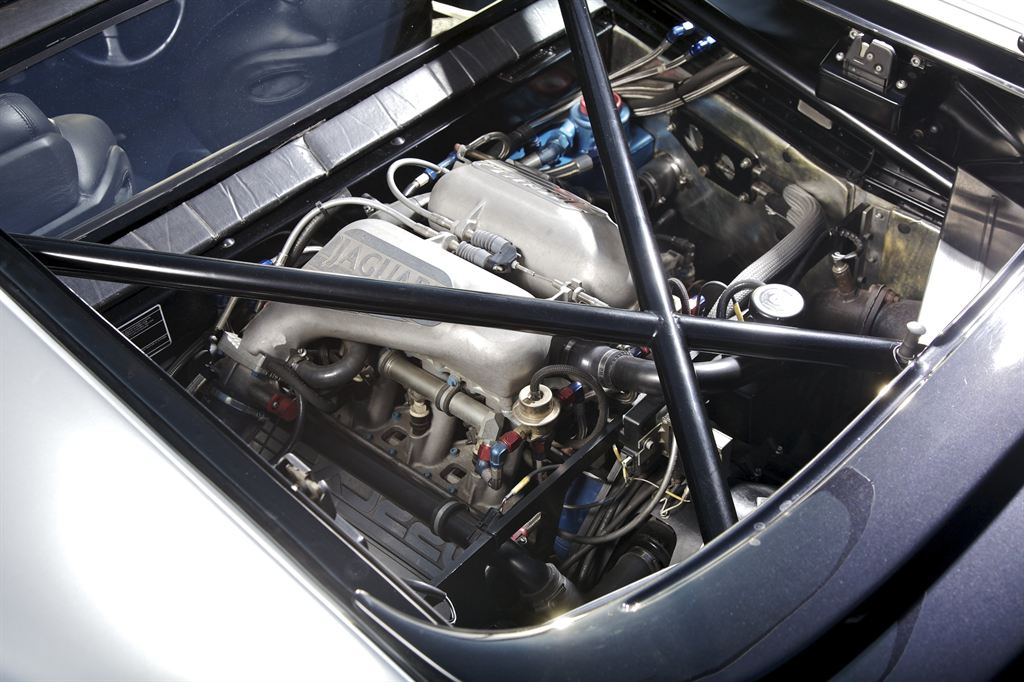
The production XJ220's V6 engine is visible through the rear window

The production version of the XJ220 used a 3,498 cc (3.5 L; 213.5 cu in) twin-turbocharged V6 engine, which was given the designation Jaguar/TWR JV6 Jaguar JRV-6 engine . This engine, which replaced the Jaguar V12 engine featured in the concept car, was a heavily redesigned and significantly altered version of the Austin Rover V64V V6 engine. The decision to change the engine was based on engine weight and dimensions, as well as environmental emission considerations. Use of the shorter V6 engine design allowed the wheelbase of the XJ220 to be shortened and its weight to be reduced; the V12 engine was definitively ruled out when it was determined it would have difficulty at simultaneously meeting emissions legislations.

TWR purchased the rights to the V64V engine from Austin Rover in 1989 and developed a completely new turbocharged engine, codenamed JV6, under the auspices of Allan Scott, with proportions roughly similar to the V64V, and suitable for sports car racing. As the V64V was originally naturally aspirated, it was necessary to redesign all parts of the engine to accommodate forced induction. A few of the changes included increasing the displacement to 3.5 litres, strengthening the internals and adding two Garrett TO3 turbochargers. The JV6 engine would first be used in the JaguarSport XJR-10 and XJR-11 racing cars; its compact dimensions and low weight made it an ideal candidate for the XJ220. The engine had a 90° bank angle, four valves per cylinder and belt-driven double overhead camshafts.

The V64V engine chosen had a short but successful career as a purpose-designed racing car engine. It was designed by Cosworth engine designer David Wood for Austin Rover Group's Metro derived Group B rally car, the MG Metro 6R4. The redesign work necessary to create the Jaguar/TWR JV6 engine was undertaken by Andrew Barnes, TWR's Powertrain Manager, and also involved Swiss engine builder Max Heidegger, who had designed and built the race engines used in the XJR-10 and XJR-11 racing cars.

The XJ220's engine had a bore x stroke of 94 mm × 84 mm (3.70 in × 3.31 in), dry sump lubrication, multi point fuel injection with dual injectors and Zytek electronic engine management. The engine was manufactured with an aluminium cylinder block and aluminium cylinder heads with steel connecting rods and crankshaft. In the standard state of tune, it was rated at a power output of 550 PS (405 kW; 542 hp) at 7,200 rpm and torque of 475 lb⋅ft (644 N⋅m) at 4,500 rpm. The XJ220 could accelerate from 0–60 mph (97 km/h) in 3.6 seconds and could attain a top speed of 212.3 mph (341.7 km/h). Road & Track tested a top speed of 210.5 mph (338.8 km/h), 0–60 mph (97 km/h) acceleration in 4.8 seconds and 12.4 seconds for the standing 1/4 mile (402 m).

The XJ220's exhaust system consists of two catalytic converters, which reduce the power output of the engine. During testing at the Nardò Ring in Italy, one XJ220 had its catalytic converters removed and its rev limit increased to 7,900 rpm; these modifications increased the car's power output by 51 hp (38 kW; 52 PS) and the car was then driven by 1990 Le Mans Winner Martin Brundle to a top speed of 217.1 mph (349 km/h). Owing to the circular nature of the track, some (including the British car magazines Top Gear and Autocar) say a speed of 217 mph (349 km/h) is equivalent to 223 mph (359 km/h) on a straight, level road. However, on other tracks it performed differently; when top speed was tested on a straight level road by Road & Track it only amounted to 210.5 mph (339 km/h), it was slower than the Bugatti EB 110 at the same event and the Ruf CTR tested there in 1987. The V64V engine had the additional benefit of being very economical for such a powerful petrol engine, according to Jaguar it was capable of achieving 32 mpg_{‑imp} (8.8 L/100 km; 27 mpg_{‑US}). In contrast, the Jaguar saloon having the smallest engine of the time, the XJ6 3.2 could only achieve around 24 mpg_{‑imp} (12 L/100 km; 20 mpg_{‑US}).

The engine was manufactured and built at the new purpose-built facility in Kidlington, Oxfordshire. TWR invested heavily in a state of the art machining facility capable of servicing all of its race and road car projects. The facility was initially setup to produce the XJ220's engine under Simon Lockwood, an ex-March Engineering suspension specialist.

=== Transmission ===
All-wheel drive was decided against early in the development process, for a number of reasons. It was thought rear-wheel drive would be adequate in the majority of situations, that the additional complexity of the four-wheel drive system would hinder the development process and potentially be problematic for the customer. FF Developments were contracted to provide the gearbox/transaxle assembly, modifying their all-wheel drive transaxle assembly from the XJ220 concept into a pure rear-wheel drive design for the production car. The transaxle featured a viscous coupling limited slip differential to improve traction.

The transmission featured triple-cone synchromeshing on first and second gears to handle rapid starts, whilst remaining relatively easy for the driver to engage and providing positive feel.

AP Racing provided an 8.5 in (22 cm) diameter clutch.

Gear	1	2	3	4	5	Final Drive
Ratio	3.00:1	1.95:1	1.42:1	1.09:1	0.85:1	3.364:1

=== Exterior ===
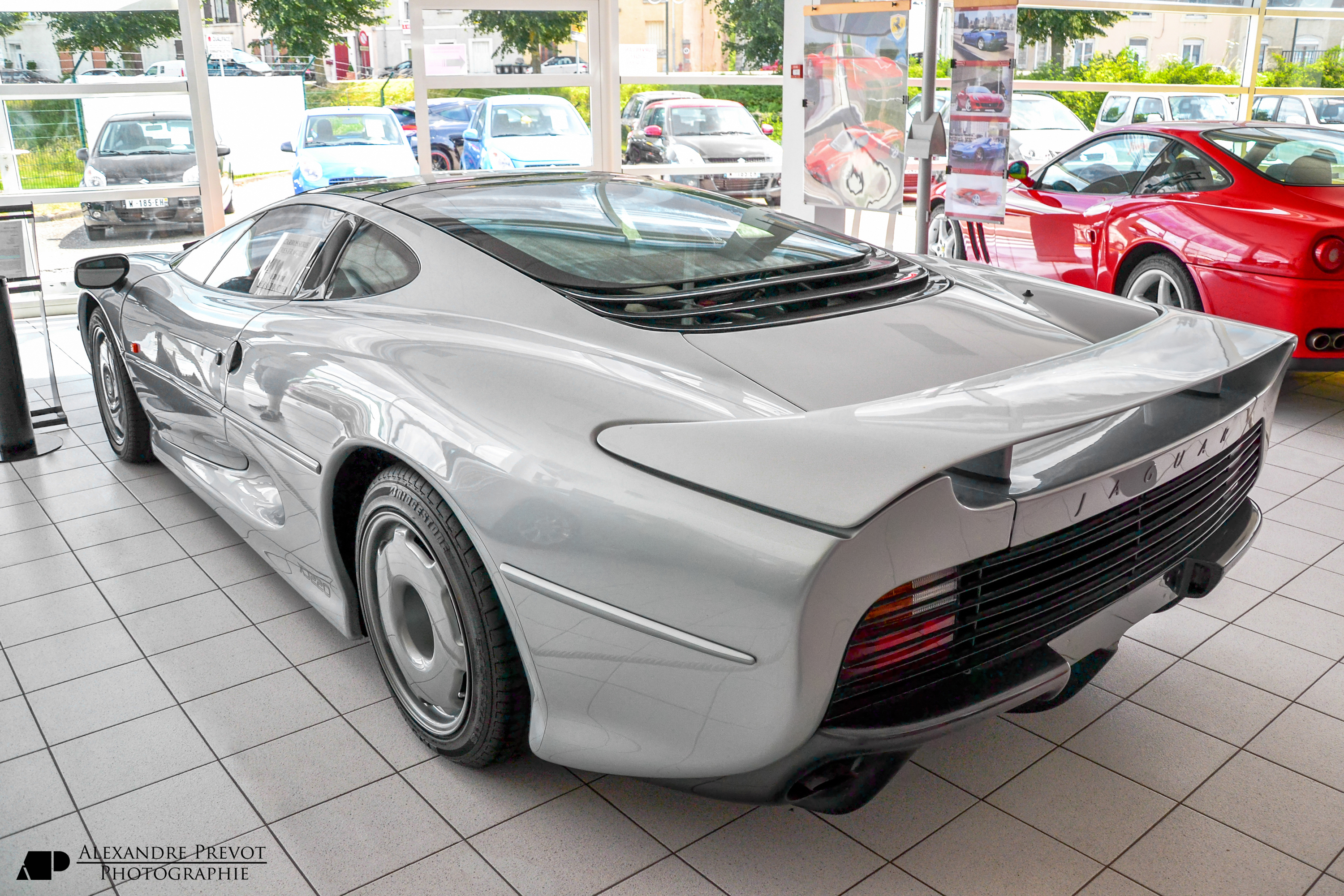
Rear three-quarters view of the production XJ220

The exterior retained the aluminium body panels of the XJ220 concept, but for the production cars Abbey Panels of Coventry were contracted to manufacture the body shells. The scissor doors were dropped for the production model and significant redesign work was carried out on the design when the wheelbase and overall length of the car was altered. Geoff Lawson, design director at Jaguar at the time, took a greater interest in the car and insisted the design had to be seen as a Jaguar if it were to be successful in promoting the company. Keith Helfet returned to undertake the necessary redesign work mandated by the change in the wheelbase, which was reduced by 200 mm (7.9 in). The turbocharged engine required larger air intakes to feed the two intercoolers. Situated between the doors and the rear wheels, the air intakes were larger on the production version of the XJ220 than on the concept car. A number of small design changes for the body were tested in the wind tunnel; the final version had a drag coefficient of Cd=0.36 with downforce of 1,361 kg (3,000 lb) at 200 mph (322 km/h). The XJ220 was one of the first road cars to intentionally use underbody airflow and the venturi effect to generate downforce. Additionally, the XJ220 could be ordered with optional BBS wheels for improved brake ventilation and aesthetics.

The rear lights used on the production XJ220 were sourced from the Rover 200.

=== Chassis ===
The production model utilised the same Alcan bonded honeycomb aluminium structure vehicle technology (ASVT) as the concept car for the chassis. The chassis design featured two box section rails which acted as the suspension mounting points and would provide an energy absorbing structure in the event of a frontal impact; these were successfully tested at speeds up to 30 mph (48 km/h). An integral roll cage formed part of the chassis and monocoque, providing additional structural rigidity for the car and allowing the XJ220 to easily pass stringent crash testing.

The rear-wheel steering was dropped from the production car to save weight and reduce complexity, as was the height adjustable suspension and active aerodynamic technology. The suspension fitted to the production model consisted of front and rear independent suspension, double unequal length wishbones, inboard coil springs and anti-roll bars, with Bilstein gas-filled dampers.

The braking system was designed by AP Racing and featured ventilated and cross-drilled discs of 13 in (33.0 cm) diameter at the front and 11.8 in (30.0 cm) diameter at the rear. The calipers were four-piston aluminium units. JaguarSport designed the handbrake, which has separate calipers acting on the rear brake discs. Feedback from enthusiasts and racing drivers resulted in the decision to drop the anti-lock braking system from the production car. The braking system was installed without a servo, but a number of owners found the brakes to be difficult to operate when cold and subsequently requested a servo to be fitted.

A rack and pinion steering was fitted, with 2.5 turns lock to lock; the steering had power assistance. The Bridgestone Expedia S.01 asymmetric uni-directional tyres were specially developed for the XJ220. Rally alloy wheel specialists Speedline Corse designed the alloy wheels, these are both wider and have a larger diameter on the rear wheels; 17 in (43.2 cm) wheels are fitted to the front and 18 in (45.7 cm) are fitted at the rear, with 255/55 ZR17 tyres at the front and 345/35 ZR18 tyres at the rear.

=== Interior ===
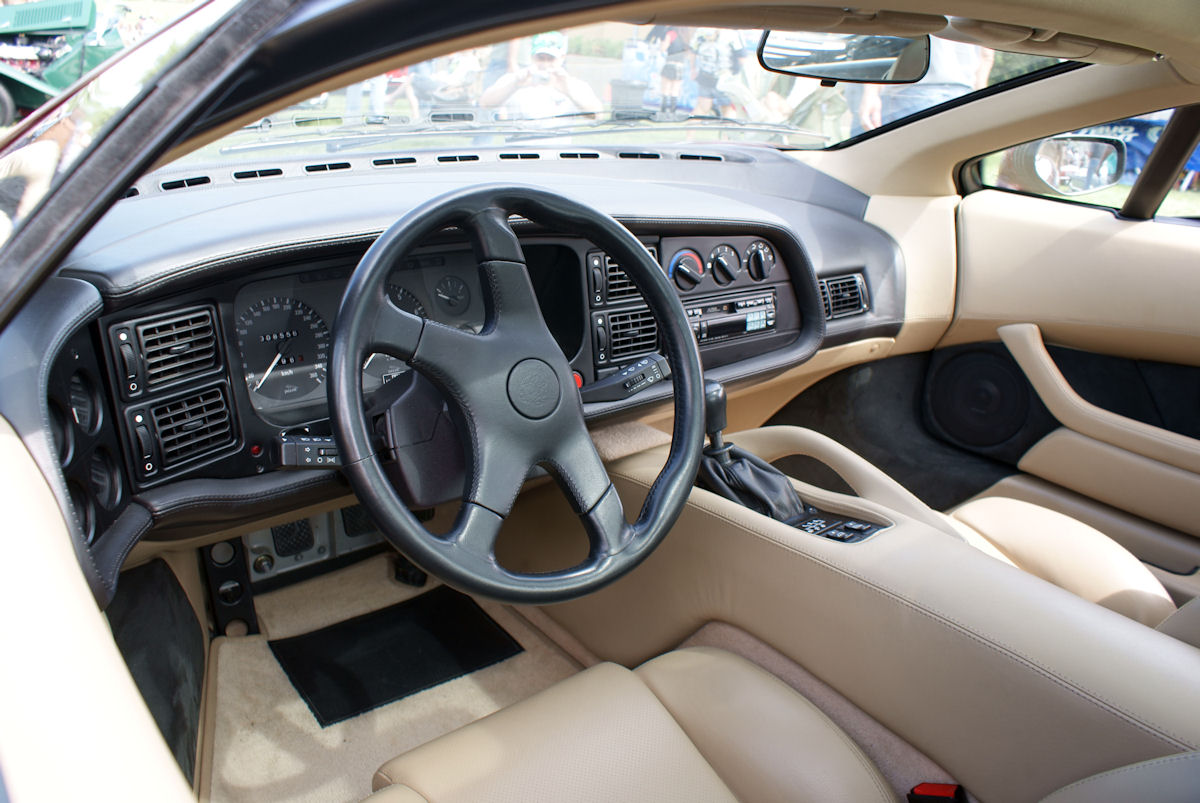
Interior

The interior was designed for two passengers and trimmed in leather. Leather trimmed sports seats were fitted together with electric windows and electrically adjustable heated mirrors. The dashboard unusually curves round and carries onto the drivers door, with a secondary instrument binnacle containing four analogue gauges, including a clock and voltmeter fitted on the front of the drivers door. Air conditioning and green tinted glazing was also fitted.

The luggage space consists of a small boot directly behind and above the rear portion of the engine, also trimmed in leather.

=== Production ===
The car was assembled in a purpose-built factory at Wykham Mill, Bloxham near Banbury in Oxfordshire. Diana, Princess of Wales officially opened the factory and unveiled the first production XJ220 in October, 1991.

The JV6 engines used in the Jaguar racing cars were produced by Swiss engineer Max Heidegger, but delivering the number of engines required for the XJ220 program was considered beyond his capacity. TWR formed a division, TWR Road Engines, to manage the design, development, construction and testing of the engines for the production cars. The JV6 engine used in the XJ220 featured little commonality with the engines Heidegger built for use in the XJR racing cars, being specifically engineered to meet performance and in particular, the European emissions requirements, which the race engines didn't have to meet.

FF Developments, in addition to the design work undertaken on the gearbox and rear axle assembly, was given responsibility for the manufacture of these components. The aluminium chassis components and body panels were manufactured and assembled at the Abbey Panels factory in Coventry, before the body in white was delivered to the assembly plant at Bloxham. The car, including chassis and body components, consists of approximately 3,000 unique parts.

The first customer delivery occurred in June 1992 and production rates averaged one car per day. The last XJ220 rolled off the production line in April 1994; the factory was then transferred to Aston Martin and used for the assembly of the Aston Martin DB7 until 2004. (Note: Jaguar and Aston Martin came under the control of the Ford Motor Company in 1994.)

== Guinness World Record ==
Jaguar had performed high speed testing of the pre-production XJ220 with chassis number 004 at the Firestone proving ground in Fort Stockton, Texas in 1991 and recorded a maximum speed of 212.3 mph (341.7 km/h), which was faster than any production car at the time.

According to Car magazine, Jaguar hoped to attain 220 mph (354 km/h) with the XJ220, mainly for promotional reasons. The decision was made to undertake further high speed testing in June 1992 at the Nardò Ring in Italy, with one journalist from Road & Track and one from the Car magazine together with a photographer and a BBC cameraman recording for BBC Top Gear as independent witnesses. None of the independent witnesses understood how Jaguar's testing equipment worked. The pre-production XJ220 with chassis number 009 would be driven by Martin Brundle, who had won the 1990 24 Hours of Le Mans driving the XJR-12.

The initial high speed runs, with the car configured in standard trim (catalytic converters connected, lower rev-limit of 7,400 rpm) achieved a maximum recorded speed of 212.3 mph (341.7 km/h), the same speed as previously reached at Fort Stockton during testing. (Note: A lower speed of 211.2 mph was recorded by a second on-board telemetry device) Brundle reported that the car was hitting the rev limiter during the run.

The rev limiter was increased to 7,900 rpm and the catalytic converters were removed in favour of installing straight-through exhaust pipes for a second series of runs, and it was this attempt which resulted in the maximum recorded speed of 217.1 mph (349.4 km/h). (Note: A lower speed of 216 mph was recorded by the second on-board telemetry device) It was estimated that the removal of the catalytic converters, which were not mandated in Europe at the time, increased the power output by around 51 PS (38 kW; 50 hp).

Guinness Book of World Records recorded the 217.1 mph run as the official fastest speed ever attained by a standard production car, this figure was reported in the 1994 to 1999 editions of the Guinness Book of World Records. Guinness World Records then recognised the McLaren F1 driven by Andy Wallace which achieved a maximum recorded speed of 240.1 mph (386.4 km/h) in March 1998 (also with rev-limiter increased) as the fastest standard production car in the world.

== Reception and sales ==
Press coverage of the XJ220 concept in 1988 was overwhelmingly positive and contributed to the decision in 1989 to put the XJ220 into limited production. The production version of the car was first shown to the public in October 1991, at the Tokyo Motor Show. The first car was launched for press review in Autumn 1991.

Autocar's Andrew Frankel was the first journalist to road-test the car and reported: "Savage acceleration really is a given here. What's really incredible about the XJ220 is its ability to provide such performance in a way that never, ever intimidates." He was particularly impressed with the throttle response, the driver's ability to control the performance of the car very precisely, and the way in which the engine delivers its power progressively rather than in one short burst.

Performance Car reviewer John Barker was also impressed with the performance as well as the ride and stability of the car, writing "The V6 has a rumbly, loping note which, in league with a remarkably supple ride, belies the speed we are travelling at. I glance to the speedo and have trouble believing that it is indicating 170 mph." Barker was also impressed with the engineering, saying "this car is catalysed, fully homologated and has passed the same tests that a Volvo needs before going on sale", going on to discuss how the vehicle looked at home on the racetrack thanks to the design. Autocar's verdict was "Right now, the XJ220 gives us a standard by which all other fast cars can be compared. For the few who will actually own and, hopefully, use their XJ220s, the fact that they are in command of the most accomplished supercar ever made should suffice."

Ergonomics and ride were also praised by Gavin Green in Car August 1992: "you sit straight ahead, pedals and four-spoked Nardi wheel beautifully positioned. There's none of the askew nonsense that plagues Italian supercars...forward visibility is panoramic and side vision is good. Rear vision is better than on some other mid-engined monsters." He went on to describe the ride: "The XJ220 rides over knobbly tarmac with extraordinary dexterity...the big Jag rides urban blacktop better than many sports saloons, never mind supercars."

In a comparison test published in the Car March 1994 issue, the testers liked the "sheer blistering pace, looks and a superb cabin" but its size, the doors not opening far enough and handling were criticised: "If there's a more evil device on our roads, I wouldn't like to find it, for the XJ220 suffers from immense initial understeer followed by violent and snappy pendulous oversteer." Most disappointing was the engine, at idle it sounded "like someone's clanking a bucket of rusty nails together". While its rival, the Bugatti EB 110, impressed the testers, the XJ220 disappointed: "The Jaguar is outmoded and lacks soul: it looks like a cynical marketing exercise and feels it in its lack of purity and coherence."

Motoring journalists have been critical of its size, being too big for a two-seater with virtually no luggage space, too wide to fit through traffic restrictors or to drive comfortably on most roads. The very heavy unassisted steering and pedals, underwhelming brakes without ABS, poor directional stability and "terrible visibility" were also disliked. Most criticised was the behavior at low revs, the engine sound was described with words like "a pail of nuts and bolts being poured through a Magimix", rattling clutch, grinding transmission, crackling chassis, rumbling and groaning body contributing to the impression of imminent breakdown. Driving in the city was sheer torture, worsened by the first gear being far too tall for stop-and-go traffic.

Sales performance was disappointing. Jaguar had intended to produce up to 350 cars, but production ceased in 1994 with 281 production cars produced, not all of which had been sold; some left-hand drive examples were still available in 1997. The recession combined with the drastic changes to the production version left many of those who placed a deposit unable to complete the purchase. The index linking of contracts exacerbated the issue, and added almost £200,000 to the purchase price between early 1990 and mid-1992. The McLaren F1 suffered from similarly poor sales performance, with just 71 cars sold against McLaren's target of 300. McLaren's F1 program eventually turned a small profit due to the sale and servicing of the 28 GTR racing variants produced.

Jaguar customers attempting to withdraw from their contracted purchases were given the option to buy themselves out of their contracts, but by 1995, the issue had resulted in legal action as buyers claimed the specification changes rendered any contracts void. Jaguar produced evidence clearly demonstrating that the vehicle specification shown in the contract matched the vehicle that was delivered and the presiding judge, John Donaldson, quickly ruled in Jaguar's favour. The last of the unsold XJ220s were sold for £127,550 plus VAT in 1997. While never officially approved for sale in the United States, the XJ220 was approved under the Show or Display exemption by 2001.

The XJ220 appeared in later motoring press articles; Evo journalist David Vivian, writing a head-to-head test between the XJ220 and the Lamborghini Murciélago in 2009, commented that "going ludicrously fast seems trivially easy" and acknowledged that the decision to change the V12 engine for a turbocharged V6 engine "would garner more acceptance now". The Lamborghini delivered the far better driving experience however: "After the XJ220, it’s almost absurdly agile", "the big difference, and it is massive, is how much more exciting, entertaining and accessible the LP640 is to drive."

== Racing ==
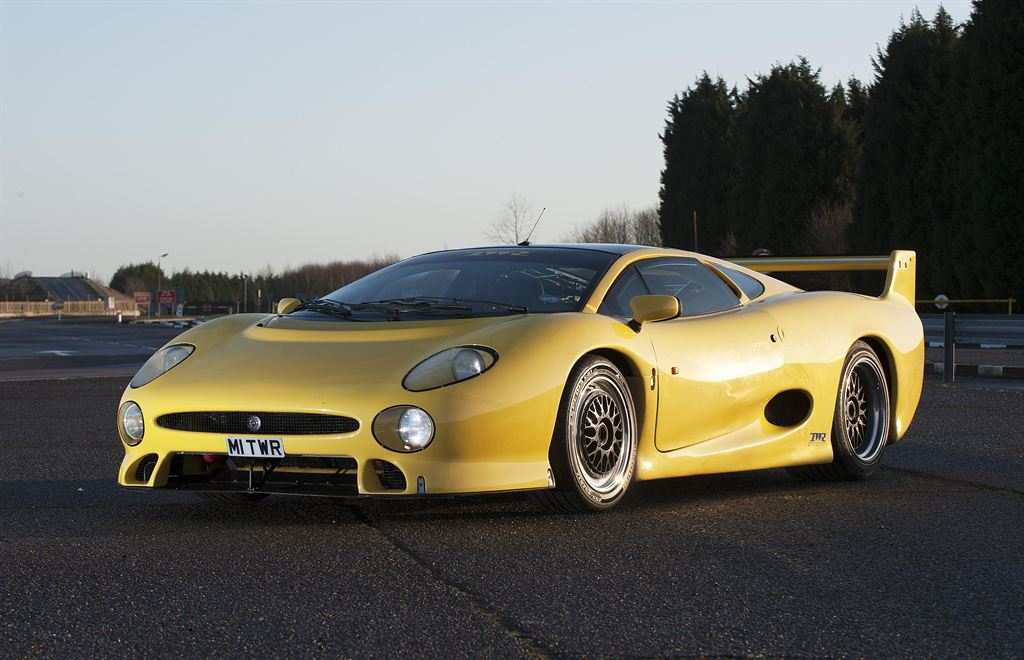
Jaguar XJ220S

A racing version was introduced at the 1993 Autosport International motor show; given the model name XJ220-C, it was built to compete in FISA GT racing. The XJ220-C driven by Win Percy won its first race, a round of the BRDC National Sports GT Challenge at Silverstone.

Three works XJ220-Cs were entered in the 1993 24 Hours of Le Mans race, in the newly created Grand Touring Class. John Nielsen, David Brabham and David Coulthard won the GT class, beating Porsche by two laps; the other two cars retired, both through engine failure. However, the class win was revoked when the Jaguar XJ220-C was controversially disqualified for failing to run with catalytic converters. The Jaguars had passed scrutiny and completed the first day of qualifying when senior steward Alain Bertaut complained that Jaguar were not running catalytic converters. The cars had been entered under the IMSA GT category and Bertaut claimed that they needed to run with catalysts. The cars ran in the race under appeal. International Motor Sports Association (IMSA) officials wrote to the Automobile Club de l'Ouest (ACO) (English: Automobile Club of the West), organisers of the 24 Hours of Le Mans, confirming that the XJ220-Cs entered had complied with IMSA rules. Jaguar won their appeal (supported by the FIA) but were nevertheless disqualified, as the ACO confirmed that the appeal had not been lodged in time.

Four cars were entered in the GT1 class for the 1995 24 Hours of Le Mans, two by PC Automotive Jaguar and two by Chamberlain Engineering, though the latter did not run their cars. Neither team had Jaguar or TWR backing; both of PC Automotive's cars were outpaced by the new McLaren F1 GTR. Richard Piper, Tiff Needell and James Weaver were holding fourth position until an engine failure during the night, ending their race, whilst the second XJ220-C retired after leaving the road.

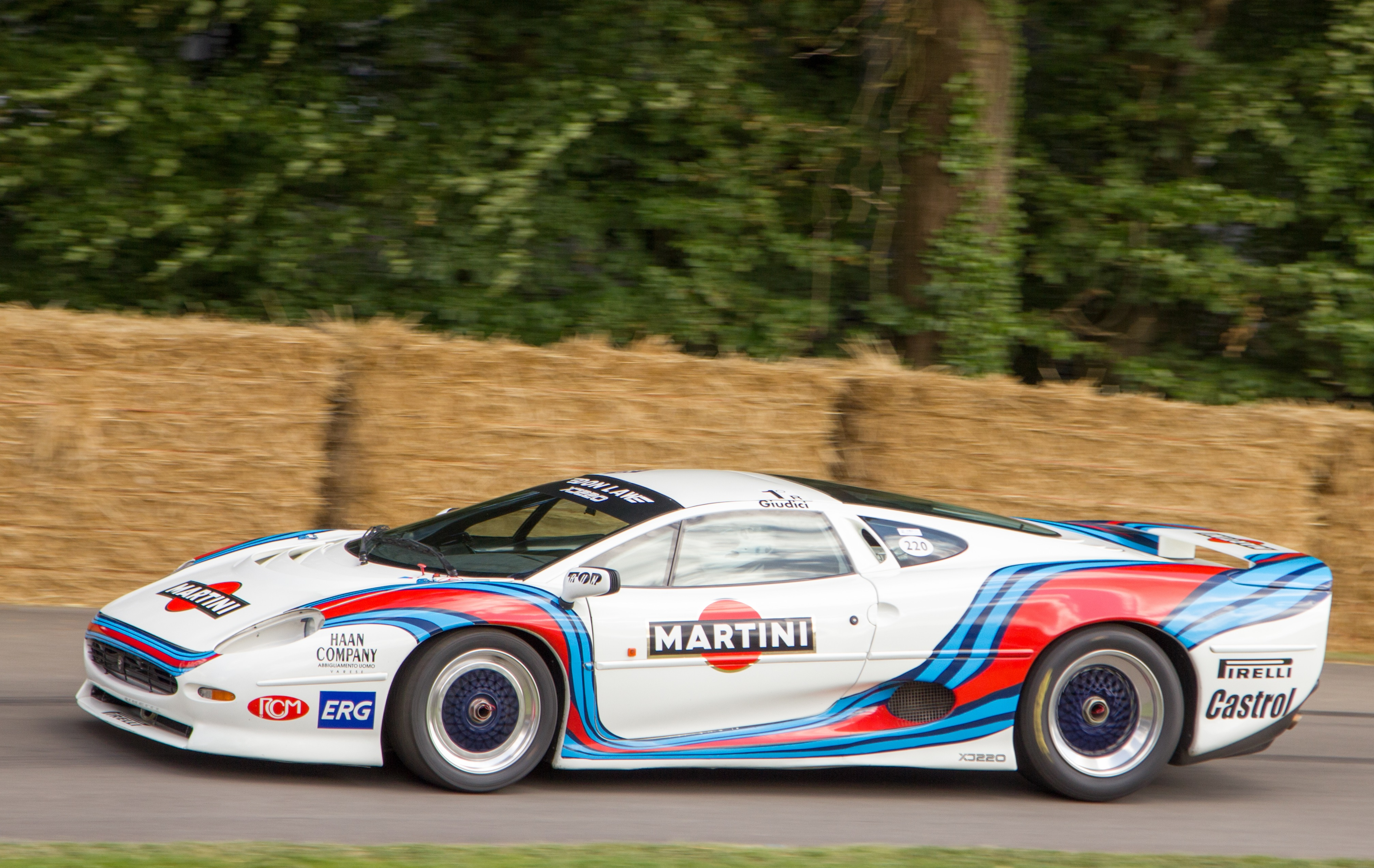
Jaguar XJ220 GT, raced in the Italian GT championship

A lightly modified road-going XJ220 was also entered in the Italian GT Championship in 1993, although without factory support; where it raced in Martini livery. This entry predated the factory's Le Mans entry.

The XJ220-C was promoted in the United States in the-made-for-TV "Fast Masters" racing series at Indianapolis Raceway Park, airing on ESPN in the summer of 1993 and featuring invited drivers over 50 years old in an elimination format. The competition became a farce due to the cars' viscous Limited-slip differentials proving ill-suited for the oval track the organizers had chosen, producing strange handling characteristics that resulted in several crashes.

TWR developed a further six road cars called the XJ220-S, featuring one-piece carbon-fibre-reinforced polymer front and rear bodywork; the engine was tuned to 700 PS (515 kW; 690 hp). The XJ220-S models did away with the hidden headlamps of the original and instead opted for perspex covered lights. The S models were essentially road-going versions of the XJ220-C race car and as a result featured a much simpler race-orientated interior with kevlar seats and the removal of the leather trim. Colin Goodwin, a writer for Autocar, tested an XJ220-S in June 1995 at Millbrook Proving Ground and set the lap record at an average speed of 180.4 mph (290.3 km/h).

== Jaguar XJ220 Pininfarina ==
The Jaguar XJ220 Pininfarina is a special XJ220 built in 1995 for the Sultan of Brunei and his brother Prince Jefri, who commissioned a number of rare and one-off heavily modified cars based on expensive luxury cars. This car was modified by Pininfarina with the redesigned body being manufactured by coach maker Coggiola with modifications including fixed headlights, new rear lights with a redesigned double-vane rear wing, and a new interior package. The car also comes with dark green exterior paint.

== See also ==
- List of Nürburgring Nordschleife lap times
- Production car speed record
