= Austin-Rover V64V engine =

Austin-Rover automobile racing engine

Austin-Rover V64V engine Jaguar JRV-6
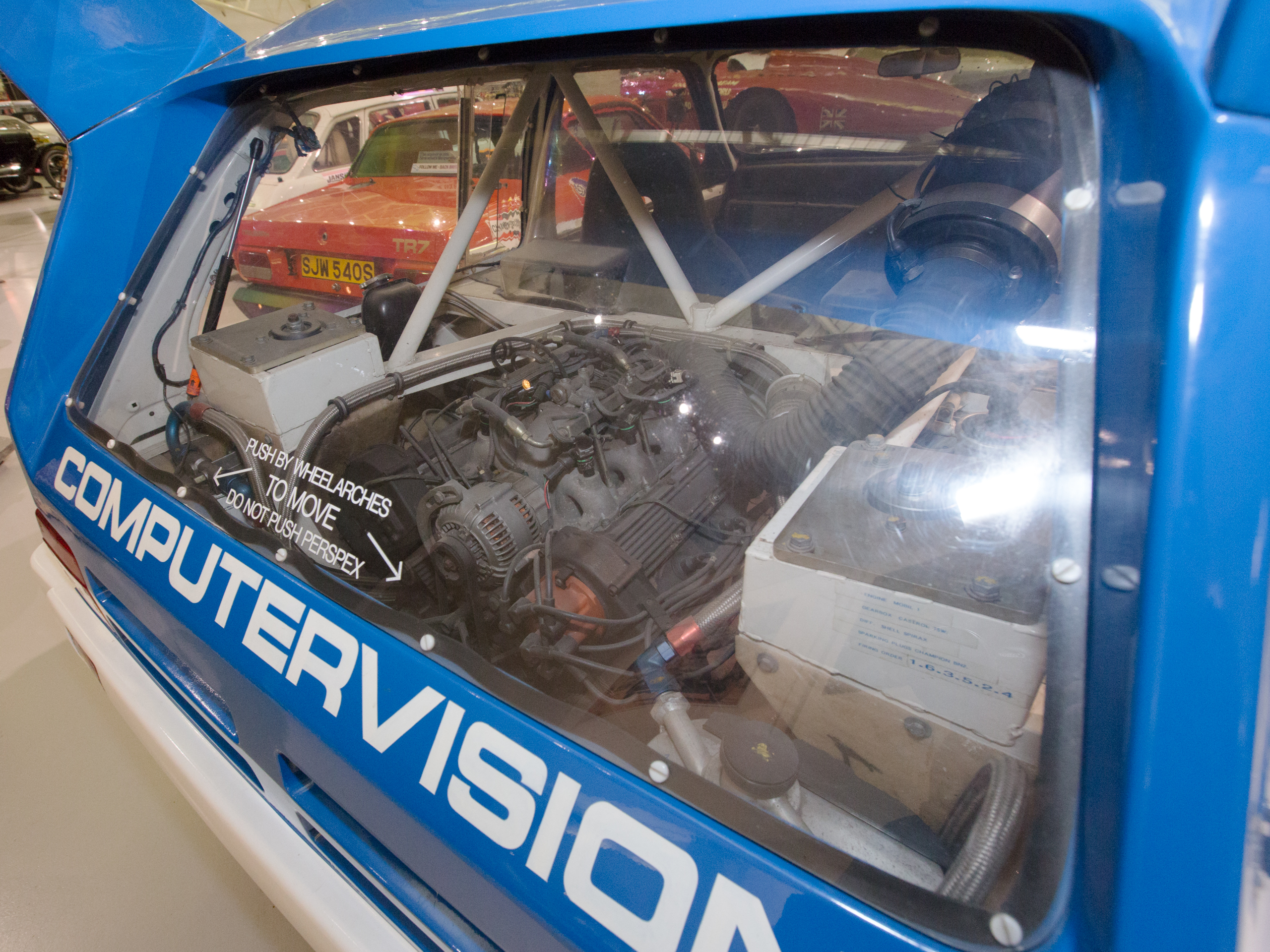

Overview
- Manufacturer: Austin-Rover; Jaguar
- Designer: David Wood

Layout
- Configuration: 90° V6, 24-valve, (four-valves per cylinder), DOHC, N/A
- Displacement: 3.0 L (2,991 cc; 182.5 cu in); 3.5 L (3,498 cc; 213.5 cu in)
- Cylinder bore: 92 mm (3.6 in); 94 mm (3.7 in)
- Piston stroke: 75 mm (3.0 in); 84 mm (3.3 in)
- Cylinder block material: Cast aluminium alloy
- Cylinder head material: Cast aluminium alloy
- Valvetrain: 24v DOHC (quad-cam)
- Compression ratio: 8.3:1–12.0:1

Combustion
- Turbocharger: N/A, Twin-Turbo (XJ220)
- Fuel type: Petrol
- Oil system: Dry sump
- Cooling system: Water-cooled

Output
- Power output: 380–750 hp (283–559 kW)
- Torque output: 270–590 lb⋅ft (366–800 N⋅m)

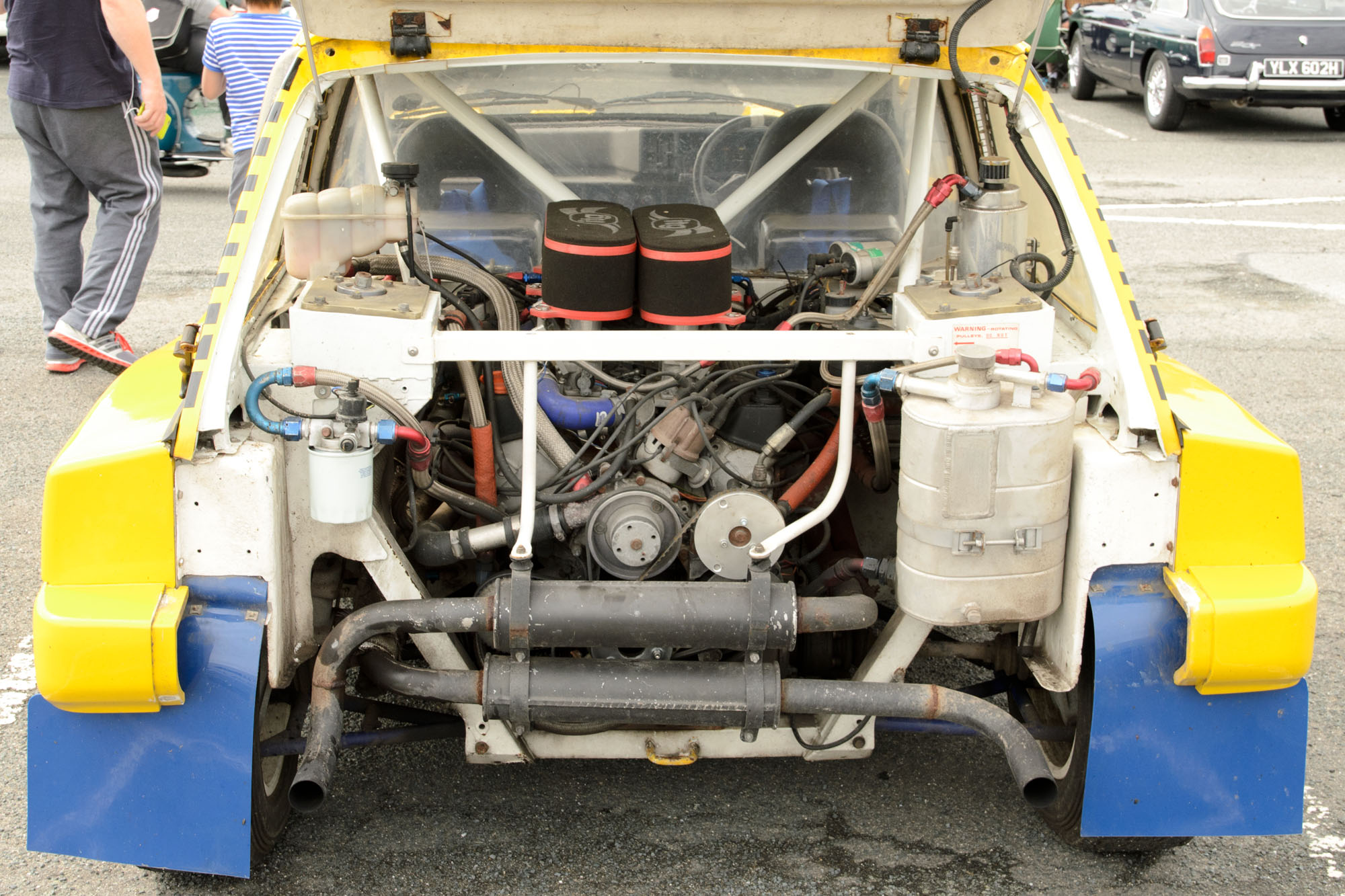
Alternate view of the engine

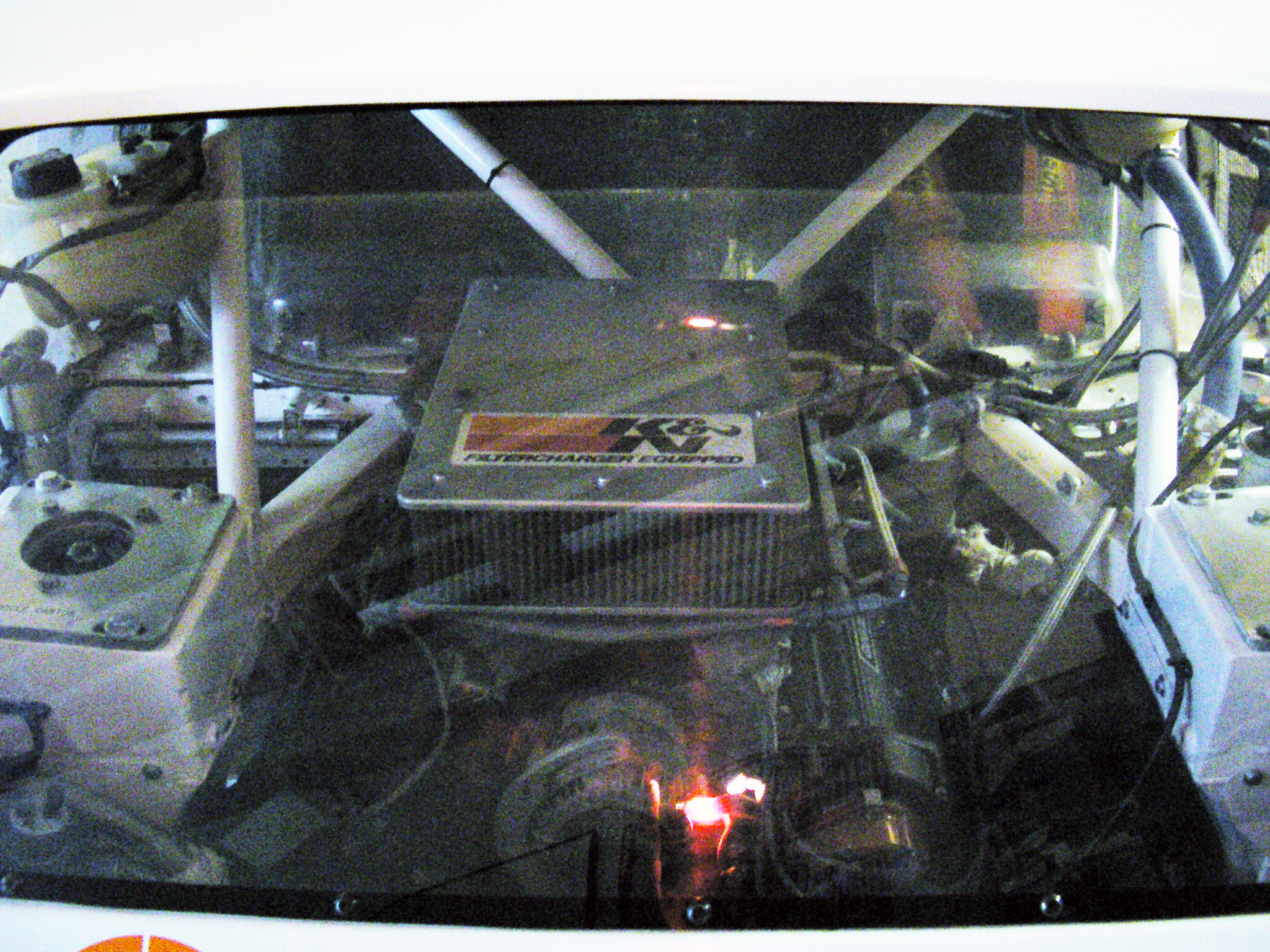
Another view of the V64V engine

The V64V engine was a purpose-built 3.0 L (180 cu in) naturally-aspirated DOHC V6 engine, designed, developed and produced by Austin-Rover, specially made for the MG Metro 6R4 Group B rally car, between 1985 and 1986. The engine then went on to power Group C cars from both Tiga and Ecosse.

== Applications ==
- MG Metro 6R4
- Tiga GC287
- Ecosse C286
- Jaguar XJ220 (production version)
