= Keith Helfet =

South African automotive designer

- Born: Edsel Keith Helfet; June 1946 (age 80)
- Citizenship: [British]
- Occupations: Car designer, Engineer

Edsel Keith Helfet (born June 1946) is a South African automotive designer.

After demonstrating little academic promise in South Africa, Helfet turned to art. He had a natural affinity for automotive design and was accepted as a student into the most prestigious automotive styling programme in the world at the Royal College of Art in London.

A native of South Africa, Helfet became the Principal Stylist at Jaguar where his work was admired by Sir William Lyons who had shaped the character of design at the brand for decades.

Helfet designed the Jaguar XJ-220, XK-180 and the unproduced Jaguar F-Type Concept Car.

Helfet now runs his own design company, Helfet Design.

Author of his design autobiography "Design & Desire" published by Porter Press International, launched at the Motoring Literary & Arts Festival at the Silverstone Racing Circuit on 23rd December 2023

== Sources ==
- Brother-in-Law, The Designer
- Building the Jaguar XK180 - An Exercise in Accelerated Development
- THE JAGUAR XK180 A CONCEPT ROADSTER FOR THE NEW MILLENNIUM
- Jaguar F-Type
