= Tom Walkinshaw Racing =

British motor racing team

Tom Walkinshaw Racing (TWR) was a motor racing team and engineering firm founded in 1976, in Kidlington, near Oxford, England, by touring car racer Tom Walkinshaw.

The company initially handled privateer work before entering works touring car racers for manufacturers such as Mazda and Rover. However, TWR became most closely associated with Jaguar, a relationship which started in 1982 with the successful entry of the Jaguar XJS into the European Touring Car Championship, chalking up a number of wins that year. The relationship continued and by 1988, TWR-Jaguar had taken its first Le Mans victory in a V12-powered XJR-9. Further success followed with a Le Mans win in 1990.

TWR and Jaguar formed JaguarSport initially to build tuned versions of Jaguar road-cars, culminating in the production of the XJ220 and XJR-15 sports cars at a new facility at Bloxham. With Jaguar bought by Ford in 1989, its relationship with TWR faded and by 1994, JaguarSport had been liquidated, with the Bloxham factory being overhauled for production of Aston Martin automobiles which was also at the time under Ford's ownership.

TWR had continued to achieve racing success with other manufacturers, notably winning Le Mans again in 1996 and 1997 in a Porsche-powered WSC-95. However, it was the costs resulting from the purchase of the Formula 1 team Arrows in 1996 that led to the demise of TWR in 2002.

The UK assets and facility were bought by Menard Competition Technologies. The facilities were used as Arrows Grand Prix International, Super Aguri and Caterham F1 teams headquarters. The Australian part of the business was sold to Holden.

The new TWR business has no connection with the thriving Melbourne-based Walkinshaw Group run by Tom’s eldest son, Ryan, which grew out of Walkinshaw’s Holden Special Vehicles operation. Ryan Walkinshaw has since built a business employing 1500 people that builds a wide range of specialist vehicles including models for five global OEMs.

== Touring and sports car racing ==
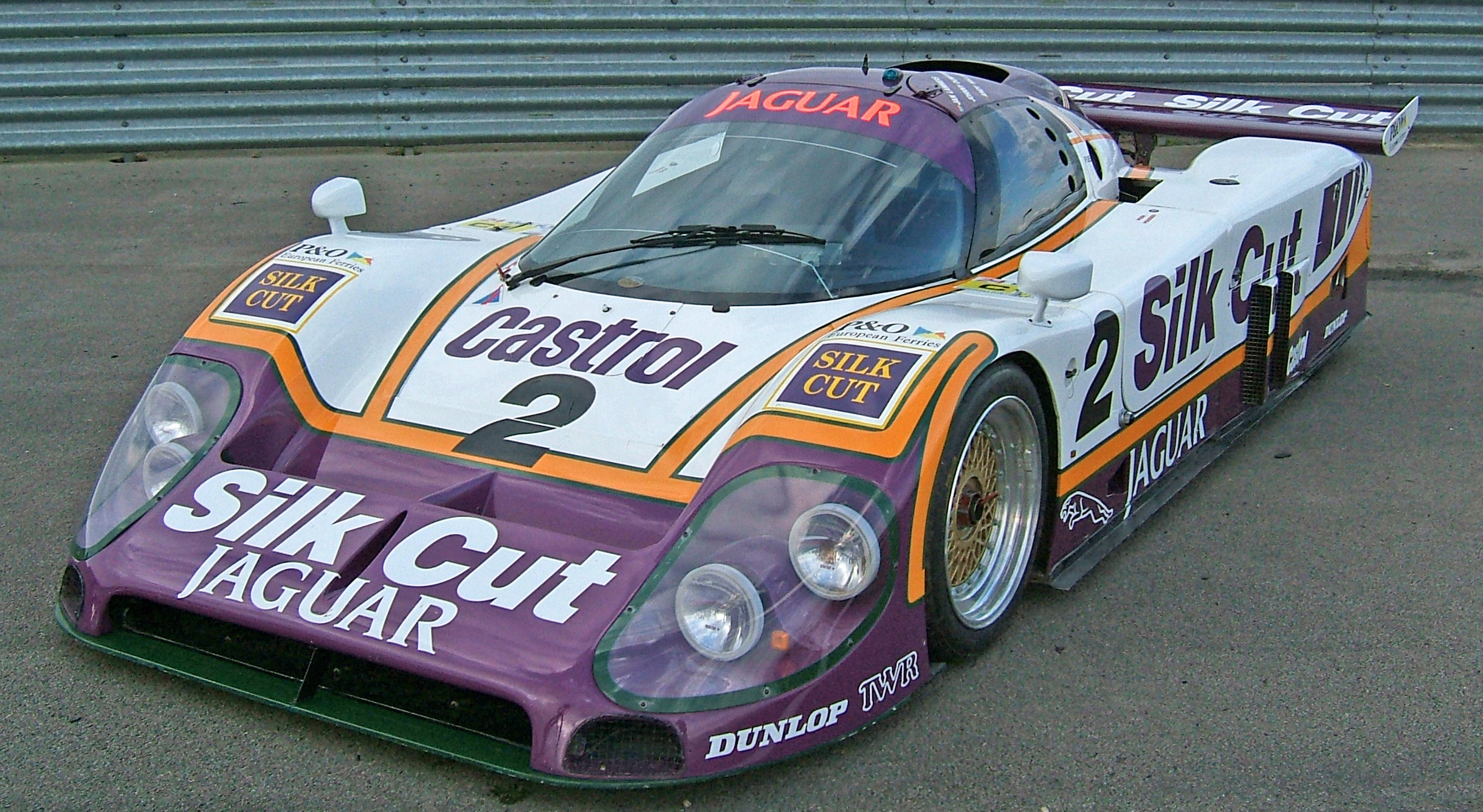
TWR won the 1988 FIA World Sports Prototype Championship for Teams with a XJR-9 sponsored by Silk Cut.

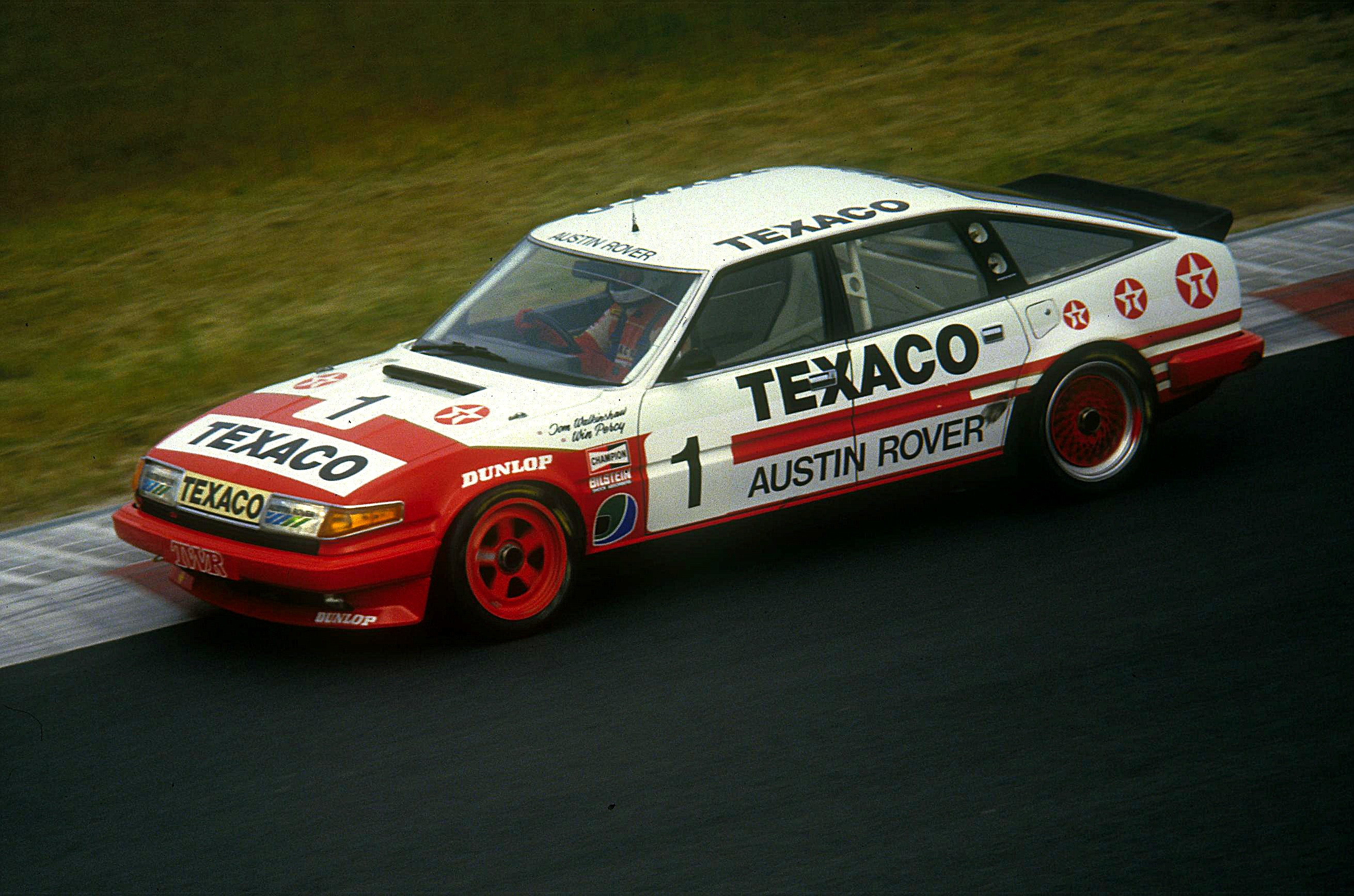
The TWR Rover Vitesse of Tom Walkinshaw and Win Percy at the Nürburgring in 1985

TWR started by modifying BMW 3.0 CSLs, but soon was contracted to head Mazda's works program in the British Touring Car Championship. The TWR developed RX-7, with Win Percy in the driving seat, won the title in both 1980 and 1981. Walkinshaw himself also took a win in the Spa 24 Hours.

After preparing the Dakar-winning Range Rover for René Metge in 1982, TWR began an association with British Leyland, preparing the Jaguar XJS and Rover 3500 Vitesse for both the BTCC and European Touring Car Championship.

Success in the latter series (as well as the French championship) with both cars led to a partnership to develop a Jaguar prototype for Group C racing, for use in both the World Sportscar Championship (WSCC) and the IMSA GT Championship (IMSA). John Egan, Jaguar chairman, was keen to put Jaguar back on the map after Jaguar was privatised in 1984 and felt that a return to sports-car racing would give Jaguar a much needed boost in international markets. As Bob Tullius' Group 44 initially ran Jaguar powered cars in IMSA, Jaguar partnered with both Group 44 (for IMSA) and TWR (for WSCC). However, it soon became clear that a single partner could successfully run in both WSCC and IMSA and so by 1988 TWR had secured the contract to run in both series.

TWR Jaguar cars won the WSCC outright in 1987, 1988 and 1991 and won the prestigious 24 Hours of Le Mans and the 24 Hours of Daytona in 1988 and 1990. The series started in 1985 with XJR-6 (Group 44 used the XJR-5 and XJR-7), designed by Tony Southgate, with a chassis built from carbon-fibre and power provided by a highly tuned Jaguar V12 engine. This was followed by XJR-8, which won the WSCC Team's Championship in 1987, then XJR-9 which won the WSCC Team's Championship in 1988 and also secured victory at Le Mans the same year, returning in much the same form as the XJR-12 to win Le Mans again in 1990. TWR developed its own engine for the next series of cars, the XJR-10 (for IMSA) and XJR-11 (for WSCC) of 1989 and 1990, employing a 3.5 litre twin-turbocharged V6, which was capable of far more power than the V12 but was less suited to 24 hour racing (hence the XJR-12 being deployed at Le Mans and the 24 hours of Daytona).

However, rule changes made the 3.5-litre turbocharged cars defunct within just one season of the WSCC and so TWR developed the all-new XJR-14 for 1991 – the first full car designed by Ross Brawn – for the final year of Jaguar racing in WSCC. Although this car won both the WSCC Drivers' and Teams' championship, Jaguar (along with almost all other manufacturers) decided that it no longer had any interest in WSCC due to unfair rule changes. For IMSA in 1991, TWR ran the XJR-16, a development of the XJR-10. In spite of six wins in fourteen races, TWR-Jaguar was placed second overall to the more consistent Nissan team. For IMSA in 1992, Jaguar's last season in sportscar racing, XJR-14 was brought to America, but lack of development to deal with tighter, bumpier US circuits meant that it could not repeat the result of the previous year in WSCC, taking second in the Driver's championship (Davy Jones) and third in the Manufacturer's Championship.

In 1991, in parallel with production of the XJR-14, TWR also developed the £500,000 XJR-15 for a select group of customers, based on the Le Mans winning XJR-9. This was raced in its own series, the Jaguar Intercontinental Challenge, supporting F1 races at Monaco, Silverstone and Spa. The winning driver, Armin Hahne, took a US$1m prize. The car was also road-legal, the only road-car to be fully designed and built by TWR.

In Australia, Walkinshaw Racing competed in the Australian Touring Car Championship, including spells as factory-back teams under the names Holden Racing Team and HSV Dealer Team. TWR also competed in the 1984 and 1985 Bathurst 1000's, winning the Group A class in 1984 with Jeff Allam and Armin Hahne driving a Rover Vitesse and winning the race outright in 1985 with a Jaguar XJS driven again by Armin Hahne, this time joined by local star John Goss.

TWR modified its XJR-14 design (which had also been used by Mazda in the final years of the World Sportscar Championship as the rebadged Mazda MXR-01) into the TWR WSC-95 for Porsche. Porsche decided against using it in 1995 due to a sudden rule change, but in 1996 it was entered at Le Mans by Joest Racing and won the race, a feat it repeated the following year at the 1997 24 Hours of Le Mans.

In 1997, Nissan Motorsports turned to Tom Walkinshaw Racing to help them develop the Nissan R390 GT1 race car (a re-bodied XJR-15) to compete in sports car racing. In the 1998 24 Hours of Le Mans, Nissan was able to achieve considerable success with all four of their cars finishing the race, placing 3rd, 5th, 6th, and 10th overall.

== Team members ==
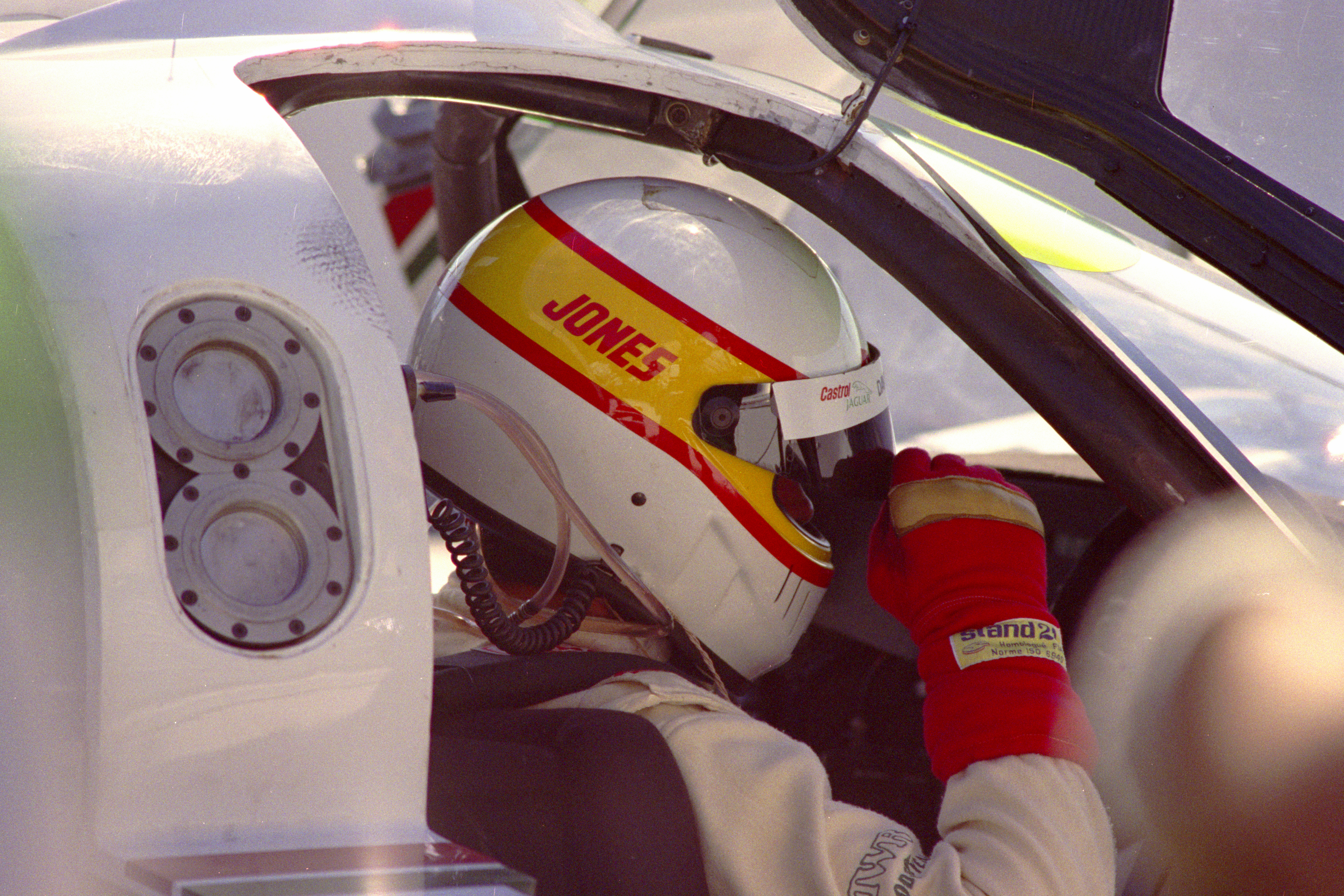
Davy Jones in the XJR-10, 1990, Del Mar

During this period, TWR worked with many of the world's leading drivers, including Win Percy, Martin Brundle, John Watson, Armin Hahne, Steve Soper, Jeff Allam, John Goss, Jean-Louis Schlesser, Gianfranco Brancatelli, Denny Hulme, Raul Boesel, David Coulthard, Jan Lammers, Johnny Dumfries, Larry Perkins, Patrick Tambay, David Leslie, Andy Wallace, John Nielsen, Davy Jones, Alexander Wurz, Manuel Reuter, Derek Warwick, David Brabham, Michele Alboreto, Stefan Johansson, Denis Lian, Tom Kristensen amongst others.

Raul Boesel (1987), Martin Brundle (1988) and Teo Fabi (1991) each won the WSCC Driver's Championship, driving for TWR-Jaguar. TWR secured victory at Le Mans in 1988 for Andy Wallace, Johnny Dumfries and Jan Lammers; in 1990 for Brundle, Nielsen and Cobb; in 1996 for Davy Jones, Alexander Wurz and Manuel Reuter and in 1997 for Michele Alboreto, Stefan Johansson and Tom Kristensen.

A number of prominent motor-racing engineers made careers at TWR, including Roger Silman (Operations Director); Tony Southgate (engineering director) and Ross Brawn (engineering director). Ian Callum was design director from 1991 to 1999. TWR was also associated with Peter Stevens, who was a director of TWR Design and designer of the Jaguar XJR-15.

== TWR in Formula One ==
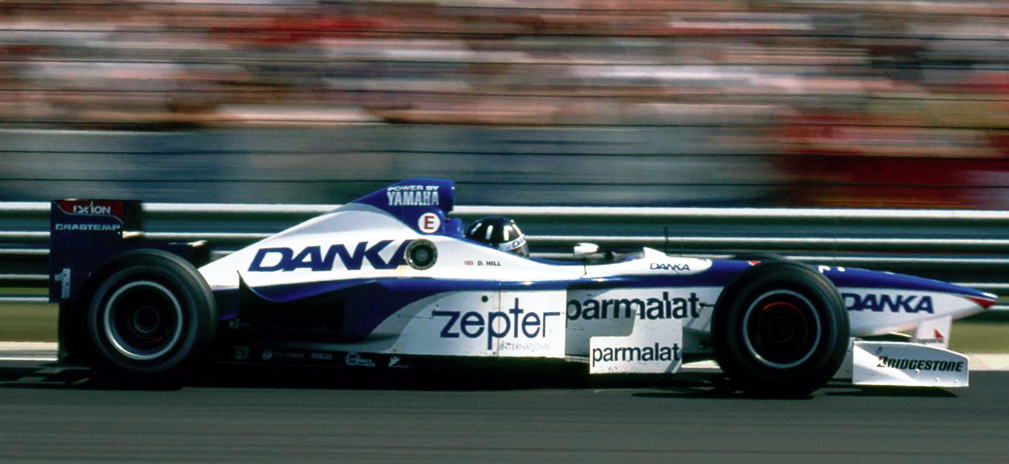
Damon Hill, TWR Arrows 1997

Tom Walkinshaw Racing was involved in Formula One from 1992 to 2002. At first, Walkinshaw became Benetton's engineering director, and was instrumental in developing the car that took Michael Schumacher to his first World Championship title in 1994. A falling out with Benetton boss Flavio Briatore saw Walkinshaw move to a position as team manager at Ligier, which had been acquired by Briatore.

After a failed attempt at purchasing Ligier, Walkinshaw instead bought a majority stake in the Arrows in 1996. The following year, Arrows surprised the world by signing World Champion Damon Hill and introducing Bridgestone tyres to Formula One. Although the team nearly won the 1997 Hungarian Grand Prix, Arrows continued to have trouble attracting sponsorship, and following the liquidation of Arrows, TWR being the major shareholder of the outfit, soon followed suit, closing its doors in 2002 with no major success with the team. TWR Australia was quickly acquired by Holden. The TWR technical centre at Leafield was sold and would later become the headquarters of the now defunct Super Aguri F1 and later Caterham F1 teams.

== Vehicle engineering ==
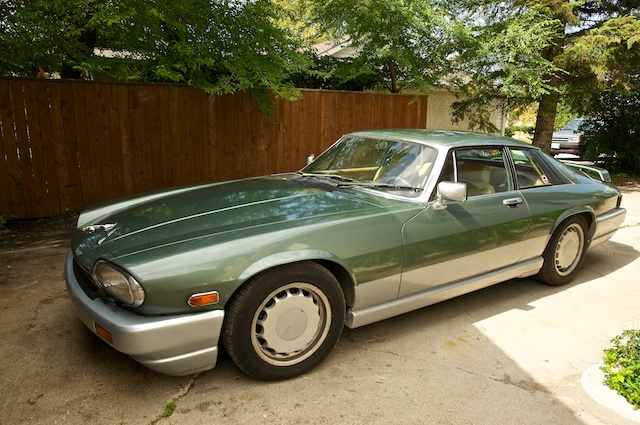
TWR Jaguar XJR-S

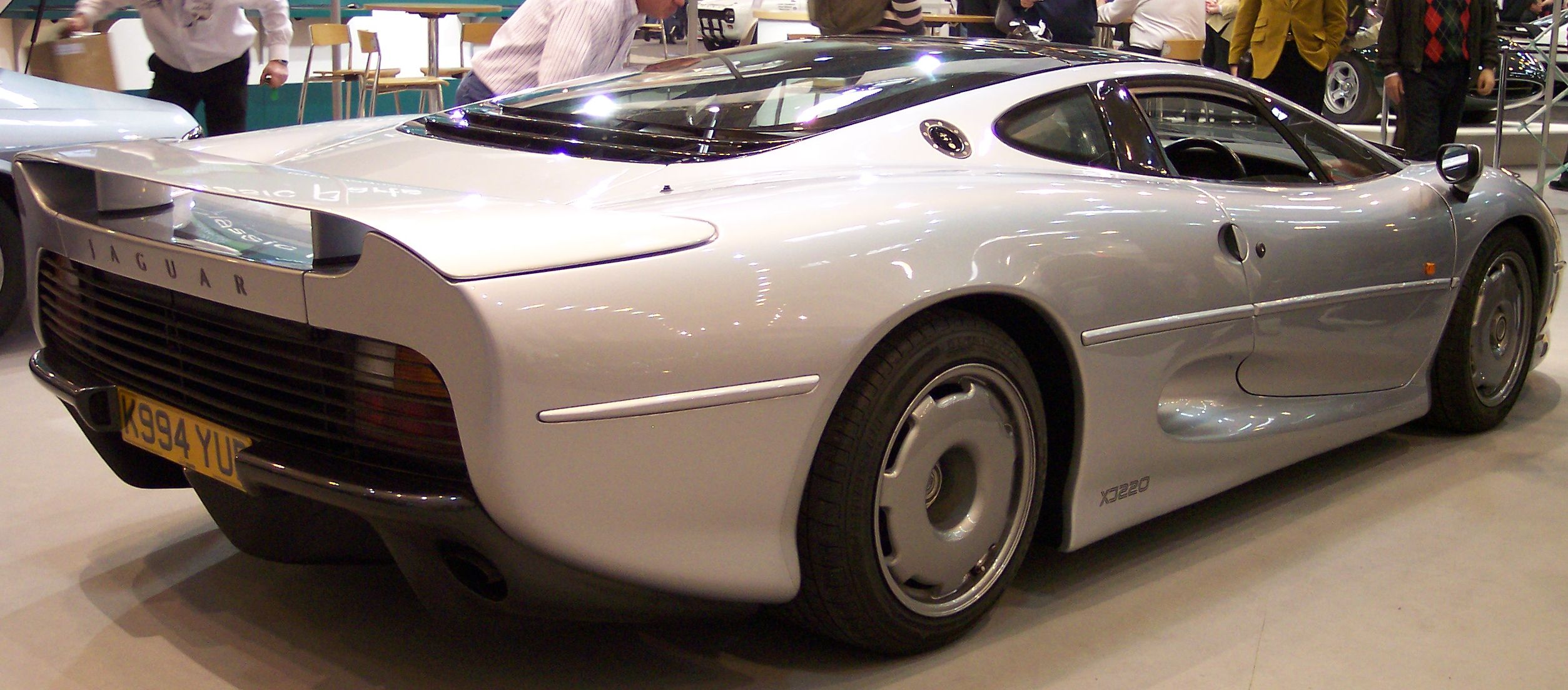
Jaguar XJ220

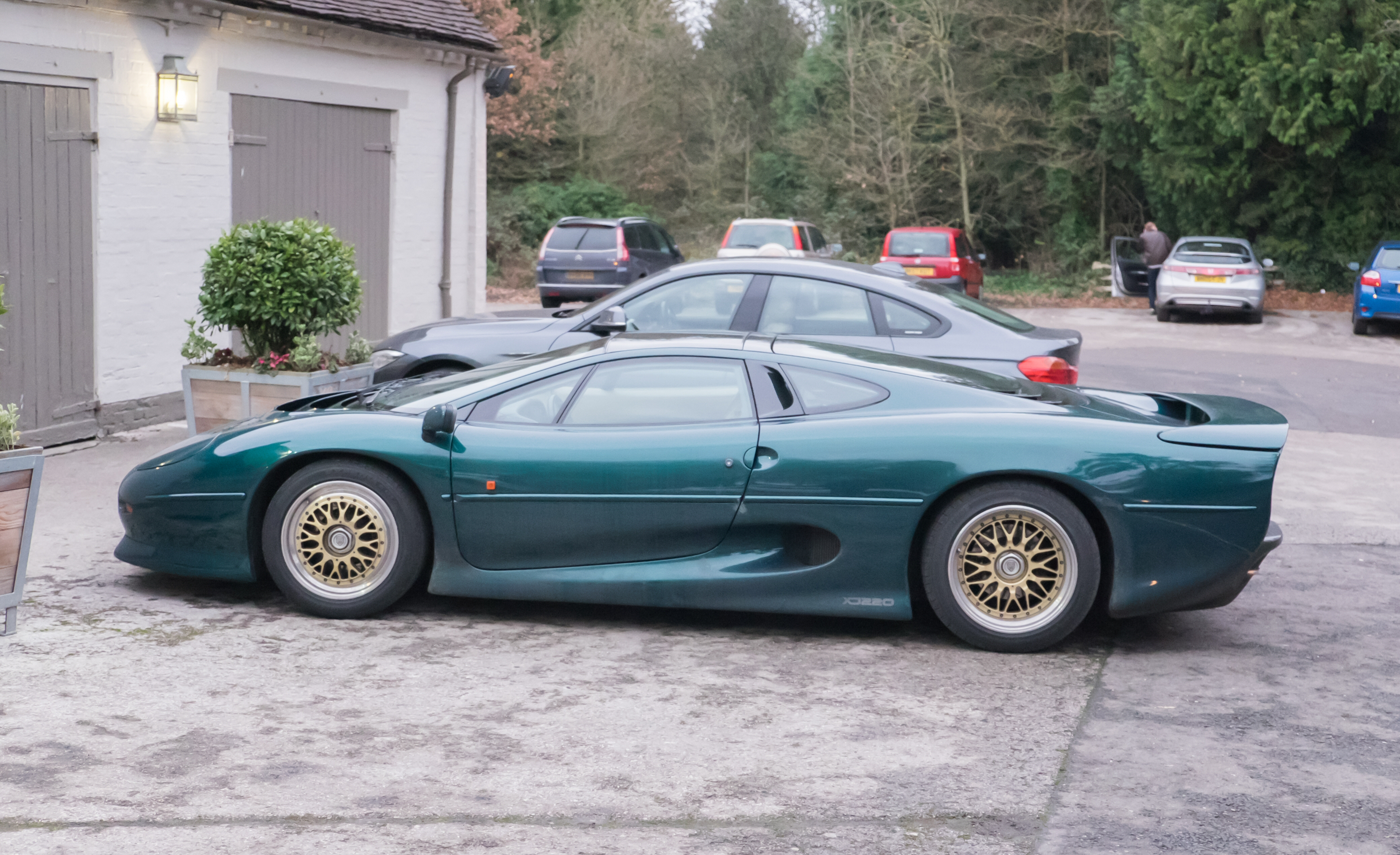
1997 Jaguar XJ220

TWR created 'TWR Sport' in 1984 to develop heavily modified versions of the Jaguar XJ-S. Designated XJR-S, the cars benefited from the racing experience in European Touring Cars, featuring improved aerodynamics; uprated suspension and brakes; tuned engine and detail changes. The success of TWR Sport led to the formalising of a joint venture (50/50) in 1988 called 'Jaguar Sport'. Jaguar Sport would initially focus on building tuned versions of Jaguar road cars (the XJR-S coupe and XJR saloon). However, with overwhelming demand to put the concept Jaguar XJ220 into production, it was decided that Jaguar Sport would design and develop the new sports car, for which a new facility was secured at Bloxham, Oxfordshire. Production commenced in 1990 and continued til 1993.

Following TWR's success with Jaguar at Le Mans in 1988, Tom Walkinshaw had been pressed by a number of wealthy enthusiasts to build them a road legal version of the XJR-9. He decided (initially outside of Jaguar's knowledge) to put a modified version of the XJR-9 into production, initially designated R-9R but ultimately designated Jaguar XJR-15, a limited-edition road-going racing car. The XJR-15 was produced in 1991 at Bloxham, alongside the XJ220.

TWR then took on the design and development role for the new Aston Martin DB7. This car was designed by Ian Callum and built at the former Jaguar Sport facility at Bloxham.

In 1996 TWR designed, engineered and built the Volvo C70 Coupé, launched with the 2.3 T5 engine used as the basis for the touring cars.

TWR's final fully developed road car was the XJ220S, limited edition racing version of the XJ220, built between 1996 and 1997. TWR took the standard XJ220, lightened it considerably by fitting carbon-fibre bodywork, an aerodynamic body kit, (derived from the XJ220C racing car) and stripping out the interior. A tuned J-V6 engine rated at 680 PS (500 kW; 671 hp) completed the package.

In 1987, Walkinshaw established a partnership with General Motors' Australian division Holden, re-creating the former Holden Dealer Team performance and tuning division, Holden Special Vehicles.

TWR undertook work for other manufacturers including development of the Renault Clio V6, and the Saab 9-3 Viggen. TWR were also involved in MG Rover's attempt to develop a replacement for the elderly Rover 45/MG ZS; they were contracted to re-engineer the Rover 75/MG ZT into a smaller car. However, the demise of Arrows and TWR meant that RD/X60, as this project was known, never reached production.

== TWR in MotoGP ==
In 1997, former motorcycle world champion Kenny Roberts formed his own racing team and manufactured a motorcycle. Basing his company in England to take advantage of the Formula 1 industry, Roberts enlisted Tom Walkinshaw Racing to help develop a three-cylinder two-stroke engine. While the motorcycle was never able to win a Grand Prix race, it did manage to win a pole position with rider Jeremy McWilliams taking the top qualifying position at the 2002 Australian Grand Prix.

== Return to British Touring Car Championship ==
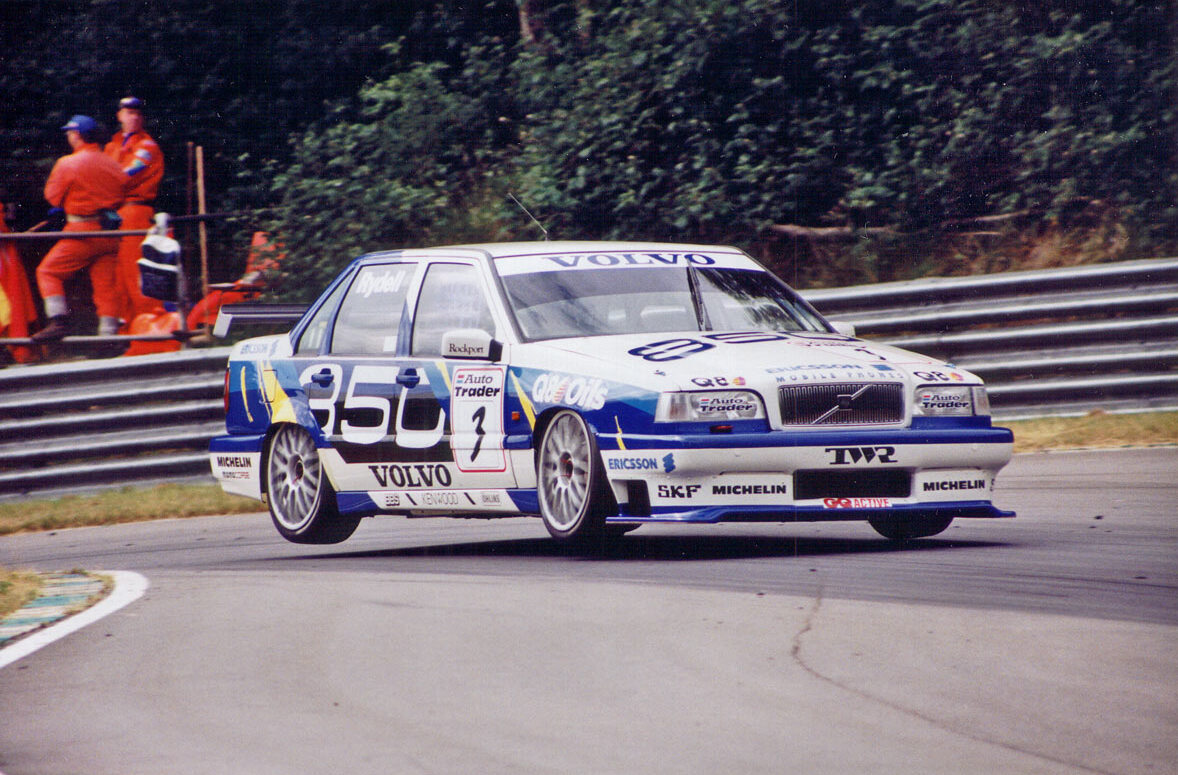
Rickard Rydell Volvo 850

In 1994, TWR returned to the BTCC, allied with Volvo. This partnership was responsible for the 850 Estate racing car, which was only rendered uncompetitive when the FIA allowed the use of aerodynamic aids in 1995. TWR then built and ran the works 850 Saloon with six wins in 1995 and five wins in 1996, and S40 securing one win in 1997 in the BTCC.

In 1998, TWR Volvo won the British Touring Car Championship with Rickard Rydell driving the S40. TWR also aided in designing the road-going Volvo C70 coupe and convertible.

== Inventory of TWR-developed cars ==
Sponsor	Model	Series	Engine/Chassis	Image 1
Mazda	RX-7	BTCC, ETCC	Mazda 2.3 litre, rotary	
Rover	Vitesse	BTCC, ETCC	Rover 3.5 litre, naturally aspirated	Rover Vitesse
Rover	Range Rover	Paris-Dakar		
Jaguar	XJ-S	ETCC	Jaguar V12, 5.3 litre, naturally aspirated TWR JC-84A #001,#002,#003,#004,#005,#006,#007; Engine designed by: Allan Scott	Jaguar XJ-S TWR 1984
Jaguar	XJR-6	WSCC	Jaguar V12, 6.2 litre, naturally aspirated, 660BHP #185, #186, #285, #286, #385, #386; Chassis designed by: Tony Southgate; Engine designed by: Allan Scott	Jaguar XJR-6
Jaguar	XJR-8	WSCC, Le Mans	Jaguar V12, 7 litre, naturally aspirated, 750BHP #187, #287, #387 plus #186 & #286 re-developed as XJR-8LM; Chassis designed by: Tony Southgate; Engine designed by: Allan Scott	Jaguar XJR-8
Jaguar	XJR-9	WSCC, Le Mans	Jaguar V12, 7 litre, naturally aspirated, 750BHP #488, #588, #688; Chassis designed by: Tony Southgate; Engine designed by: Allan Scott	Jaguar XJR-9
Jaguar	XJR-9 IMSA	IMSA	Jaguar V12, 7 litre, naturally aspirated, 750BHP #188, #288, #388; Chassis designed by: Tony Southgate; Engine designed by: Allan Scott	Jaguar XJR-9
Holden	VL Commodore SS Group A SV	ETCC, BTCC, ATCC, AEC	Holden V8, 5 litre, naturally aspirated, 500BHP	Holden VL Commodore SS Group A SV
Jaguar	XJR-10	IMSA	Jaguar V6, 3.0 litre, turbo-charged, 650BHP+ #389, #489, #589, #390, #690; Chassis designed by: Tony Southgate and Ross Brawn; Engine designed by: TWR	Jaguar XJR-10
Jaguar	XJR-11	WSCC	Jaguar V6, 3.5 litre, turbo-charged, 750BHP+ #189, #289, #490, #590 #1190, #1290, #1390; Chassis designed by: Tony Southgate and Ross Brawn; Engine designed by: TWR	Jaguar XJR-11
Jaguar	XJR-11	All Japan Sports Prototype Championship	Jaguar V6, 3.5 litre, turbo-charged, 750BHP+ #490, #590; Chassis designed by: Tony Southgate and Ross Brawn; Engine designed by: TWR	XJR-11 at Fuji 1000km 1991
Holden	VN Commodore SS Group A SV	ATCC, AEC	Holden V8, 5 litre, naturally aspirated, 520BHP	Holden VN Commodore SS Group A SV
Jaguar	XJR-12	IMSA, Le Mans	Jaguar V12, 7 litre, naturally aspirated, 750BHP; XJR-12/190 and /290 were new chassis while chassis 588 renumbered XJ12-/990 and 288 (the GTP car which came 1st in the 1988 Daytona 24 Hours), was renumbered XJR-12/1090; Chassis designed by: Tony Southgate; Engine designed by: Allan Scott	Jaguar XJR-12
Jaguar	XJR-14	WSCC, IMSA	Cosworth V8, 3.5 litre, turbo-charged, 650BHP+ #591, #691, #791, #192; Chassis designed by: Ross Brawn and John Piper; Engine designed by: Cosworth	Jaguar XJR-14
Jaguar	XJR-15	Jaguar Intercontinental Challenge	Jaguar V12, 6 litre, naturally aspirated, 450BHP; XJR-15 / 50 cars manufactured, 16 raced, 001 -> 050; Designed by: Tony Southgate with body styling by Peter Stevens; Engine designed by: Allan Scott	Jaguar XJR-15 Chassis 20
Jaguar	XJR-16	IMSA	Jaguar V6, 3.5 litre, turbo-charged #191, #291; Designed by: Tony Southgate; Engine designed by: TWR	XJR-16 at Silverstone Classic, 2012
Jaguar	XJ220C	Le Mans	Jaguar V6, 3.5 litre, turbo-charged, 500BHP (restricted) #839,#838,#837,#836; Chassis designed by: Keith Helfet, Jim Randle and Richard Owen; Engine designed by: TWR	
Nissan	R-390 (re-styled XJR-15)	Le Mans	TWR-Nissan V8, 3.5 litre, turbo-charged #R1, #R2, #R3, #R4; Designed by: Tony Southgate and Ian Callum	Nissan R-390
Porsche (Joest)	WSC-95 (re-styled XJR-14)	Le Mans	Porsche 3.0 litre Flat 6, turbo-charged #001, #002; Chassis designed by: Ross Brawn and John Piper	Porsche Joest WSC-95
Mazda	MXR-01 (re-styled XJR-14)	WSCC	Mazda (Judd) V10, 3.5 litre, naturally aspirated, 001,002,003,004,005; Chassis designed by: Ross Brawn and John Piper	Mazda MXR-01

== Motorsports results ==
Years	Series / Race	Associate Manufacturer	Cars	Driver(s)	Results
1980 - 1981	British Touring Car Championship, European Touring Car Championship	Mazda	RX-7	Win Percy, Pierre Dieudonné, Tom Walkinshaw, Chuck Nicholson	BTCC Championship winner (Percy), 1980 and 1981, ETCC winner 1981
1982	Paris-Dakar	Rover	Range Rover	Rene Metge, Bernard Giroux	Overall Winner (Metge, Giroux)
1981-1987	British Touring Car Championship	Rover	Vitesse	Andy Rouse, Peter Lovett, Jeff Allam, Neil McGrath, Pete Hall, Dennis Leech, Graham Scarborough, Tim Harvey	Championship winner, 1983 (later DQ on technicality); Championship winner (Rouse), 1984
1982-1984	European Touring Car Championship	Jaguar	XJ-S	Tom Walkinshaw, Hans Heyer, Win Percy, Jean-Louis Schlesser, Enzo Calderari, Chuck Nicholson, Armin Hahne, Martin Brundle	2nd in 1983, Championship winner (Walkinshaw), 1984. Spa 24 Hours winner (Walkinshaw, Percy, Heyer) 1984
1984	James Hardie 1000	Rover	Vitesse	Jeff Allam, Armin Hahne, Steve Soper, Ron Dickson	1st in class (Allam, Hahne)
1985	James Hardie 1000	Jaguar	XJ-S	Tom Walkinshaw, Win Percy, Jeff Allam, Ron Dickson, John Goss, Armin Hahne	Winner (Goss, Hahne), third place (Walkinshaw, Percy) and DNF (Allam, Dickson)
1985	French Saloon Car Championship	Rover	Vitesse	Jean-Louis Schlesser	Championship Winner 1985
1985-1986	European Touring Car Championship	Rover	Vitesse	Tom Walkinshaw, Win Percy, Jean-Louis Schlesser, Eddy Joosen, Pierre-Alain Thibaut, Steve Soper, Hans Heyer, Martin Brundle, Gianfranco Brancatelli, Denny Hulme, Neville Crichton, Dave McMillan	3rd in 1985 (Walkinshaw, Percy). 2nd in 1986 (Percy)
1985	World Endurance Championship	Jaguar	XJR-6	Martin Brundle, Hans Meyer, Mike Thackwell, Jean-Louis Schlesser	7th in Teams Championship
1986	World Sports Prototype Championship	Jaguar	XJR-6	Derek Warwick, Eddie Cheever, Jean-Louis Schlesser, Gianfranco Brancatelli, Brian Redman, Armin Hahne, Hans Heyer, Jan Lammers	3rd in Teams Championship; DNF at Le Mans
1987	World Sports Prototype Championship	Jaguar	XJR-8	Martin Brundle, John Watson, Jan Lammers, Eddie Cheever, Raul Boessel, Armin Hahne, John Nielsen, Win Percy, Johnny Dumfries	Drivers Championship winner (Boessel); also top 4 drivers (Raul Boessel, Jan Lammers, John Watson, Eddie Cheever); Teams Championship winner; 5th at Le Mans
1988	World Sports Prototype Championship	Jaguar	XJR-9	Martin Brundle, John Nielsen, John Watson, Andy Wallace, Jan Lammers, Johnny Dumfries, Eddie Cheever, Raul Boesel, Henri Pescalaro, Danny Sullivan, Price Cobb, Derek Daly, Kevin Cogan, Larry Perkins	Drivers Championship winner (Brundle); Teams Championship winner; Winner: 24-hours Le Mans (Lammers, Wallace, Dumfries)
1988	IMSA	Jaguar	XJR-9	Eddie Cheever, Johnny Dumfries, John Watson, Martin Brundle, Raul Boesel, John Nielsen, Jan Lammers, Davy Jones, Danny Sullivan,	2nd in Driver's championship (Nielsen); 3rd in Manufacturer's Championship Winner: 24-hours Daytona (Brundle, Boesel, Nielsen)
1988	European Touring Car Championship	Holden	Commodore	Tom Walkinshaw, Jeff Alam	15th at RAC Tourist Trophy
1989	World Sports Prototype Championship	Jaguar	XJR-11 / 9	Jan Lammers, Patrick Tambay, Andy Wallace, Alain Ferte, John Nielsen, Davy Jones, Price Cobb, Andrew Gilbert-Scott, Derek Daly, Jeff Kline, Michel Ferte, Eliseo Salazar	NOTE: transition year from V12 to V6 turbo 8th in Drivers championship (Tambay); 4th in Teams Championship
1989	IMSA	Jaguar	XJR-10 / 9	Derek Daly, Martin Donnelly, Patrick Tambay, Jan Lammers, Davy Jones, Raul Boesel, Price Cobb, John Nielsen, Andy Wallace	NOTE: transition year from V12 to V6 turbo 3rd (Cobb) and 4th (Nielsen) in Driver's Championship. 2nd in Manufacturer's Championship
1990	World Sports Prototype Championship	Jaguar	XJR-11 / 12	Martin Brundle, Alain Ferte, Jan Lammers, Andy Wallace, David Leslie, Franz Konrad, John Nielsen, Price Cobb, Eliseo Salazar, Davy Jones, Michel Ferte, Luis Pérez-Sala	NOTE: XJR-12 used for early part of season and Le Mans Winner: 24-hours Le Mans (Brundle, Nielsen, Cobb) in XJR-12; 2nd in Teams Championship; 4th in Drivers Championship (Wallace)
1990	IMSA	Jaguar	XJR-10 / 16	Martin Brundle, Price Cobb, John Nielsen, Davy Jones, Jan Lammers, Andy Wallace, Alain Ferte	2nd in Manufacturer's championship; 3rd (Jones) and 5th (Nielsen) in Driver's Championship; Winner: 24-hours Daytona (Brundle, Boesel, Nielsen)
1991	World Sportscar Championship	Jaguar	XJR-14 / 12	Derek Warwick, Martin Brundle, Teo Farbi, John Nielsen, Bob Wollek, Kenny Acheson, Davy Jones, Raul Boesel, Michel Ferte, David Leslie, Mauro Martini, Jeff Krosnoff	NOTE: XJR-12 used solely for Le Mans Winner: Teams Championship; Winner, Drivers Championship (Farbe); 2nd, 3rd, 4th at Le Mans 24 hours
1991	IMSA	Jaguar	XJR-10 / 12 / 16	Martin Brundle, John Nielsen, Eddie Cheever, Kenny Acheson, Davy Jones, Scott Pruett, Derek Warwick, Raul Boesel	NOTE: XJR-12 used solely for 24 hours Daytona 2nd in 24 hours Daytona; 3rd in Driver's Championship (Jones); 2nd in Manufacturer's Championship
1991	Jaguar Intercontinental Challenge	Jaguar	XJR-15	Derek Warwick, David Brabham, Davy Jones, Juan Manuel Fangio, Armin Hahne, Bob Wollek, Tiff Needell, Jim Richards, Matsuaki Sanada, Cor Euser, David Leslie, Andy Evans, Yojiro Terada, Ian Flux, Matt Aitken, John Watson	Jaguar Intercontinental Challenge (1 make series): Winner, Armin Hahne
1992	IMSA	Jaguar	XJR-12 / 14	Davy Jones, David Brabham, Scott Pruett, Scott Goodyear	NOTE: XJR-12 used solely for 24 hours Daytona 2nd in 24 hours Daytona; 2nd in Driver's Championship (Jones); 3rd in Manufacturer's Championship
1992	World Sportscar Championship	Mazda	XJR-14 (rebadged MXR-01)	Maurizio Sandro Sala, Johnny Herbert, Alex Caffi, Volker Weidler	3rd in Teams Championship; 4th in Le Mans 24 hours, 8th in Drivers Championship (Sala)
1993	IMSA	Jaguar	XJR-12	Davy Jones, David Brabham, Scott Pruett, Scott Goodyear, John Nielsen, John Adretti	ENTRY IN 24 HOURS DAYTONA ONLY Result: 10th
1993	Le Mans	Jaguar	XJ220C	David Brabham, Andreas Fuchs, Armin Hahne, Jay Cochrane, Win Percy, David Leslie, John Nielsen, Paul Belmondo, David Coulthard	Winner, GT Class (Nielsen, Coulthard, Brabham). Subsequently, disqualified due to procedural error relating to catalytic converters
1996	Le Mans	Porsche (Joest Racing)	WSC-95 (re-bodied XJR-14)	Davy Jones, Alex Wurz, Manuel Reuter	Winner
1997	Le Mans	Porsche (Joest Racing)	WSC-95 (re-bodied XJR-14)	Michele Alboreto, Stefan Johansson, Tom Kristensen	Winner
1997	Le Mans	Nissan	R390 (re-styled XJR-15)	Kazuyoshi Hoshino, Érik Comas, Masahiko Kageyama	12th
1998	Le Mans	Nissan	R390 (re-styled XJR-15)	Aguri Suzuki, Kazuyoshi Hoshino, Masahiko Kageyama, John Nielsen, Michale Krumm, Franck Lagorce, Jan Lammers, Erik Comas, Andreas Montermini, Satoshi Motoyama, Takuya Kurosawa, Masami Kageyama	3rd, 5th, 6th, 10th

== Gallery ==
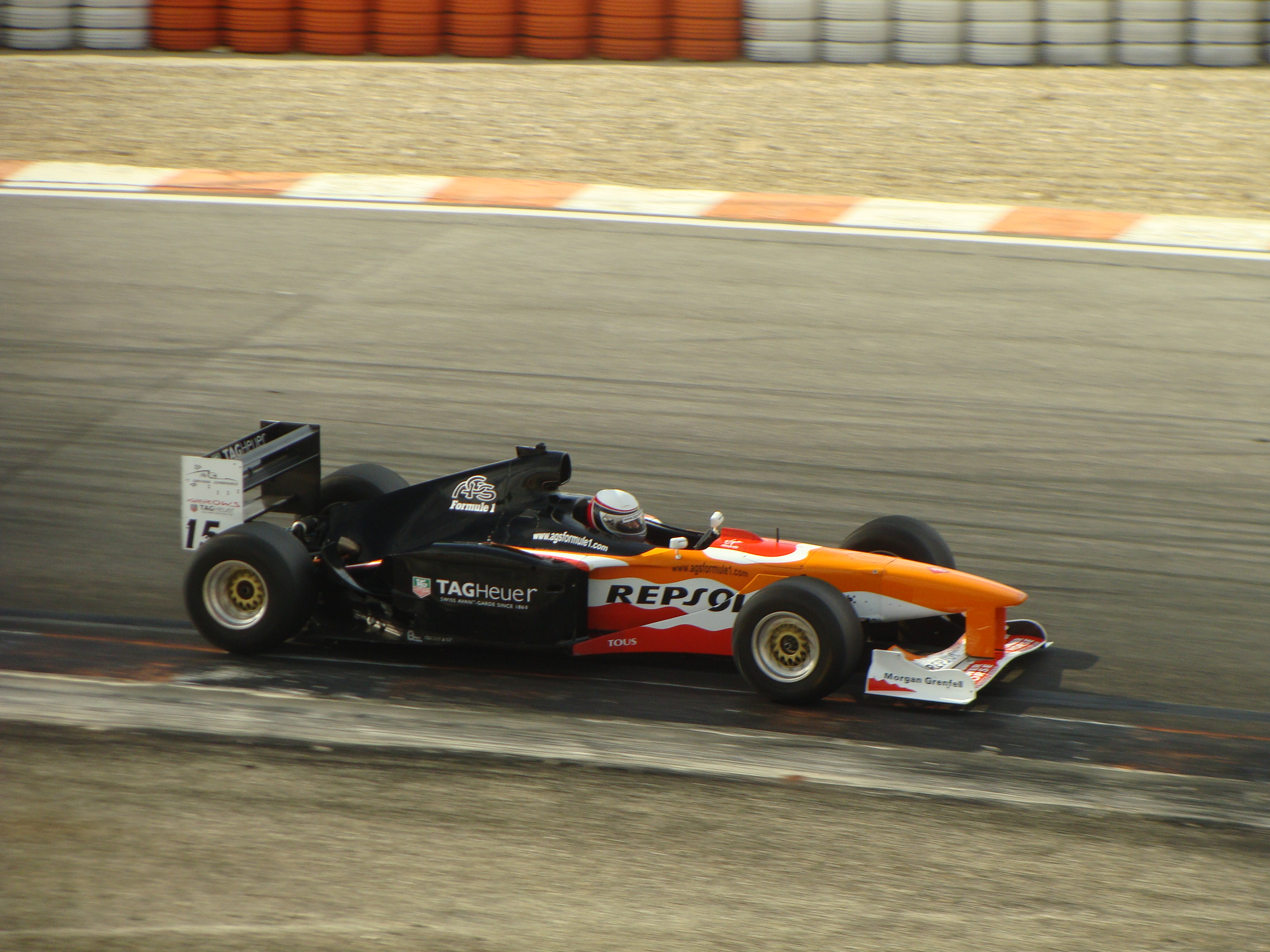
Arrows A20 Formula One car

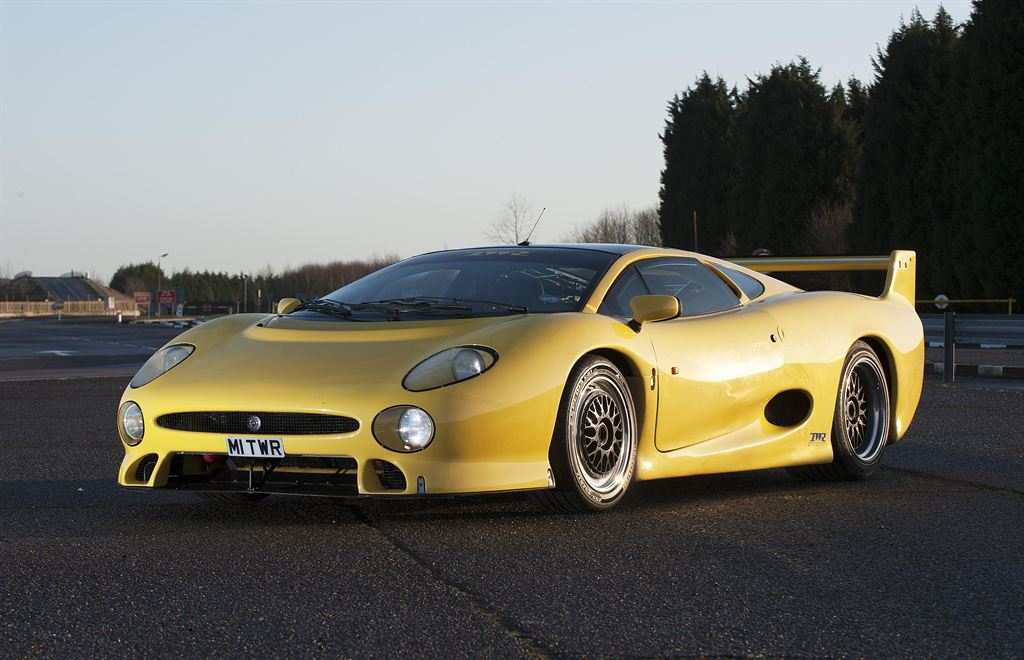
Jaguar XJ220S

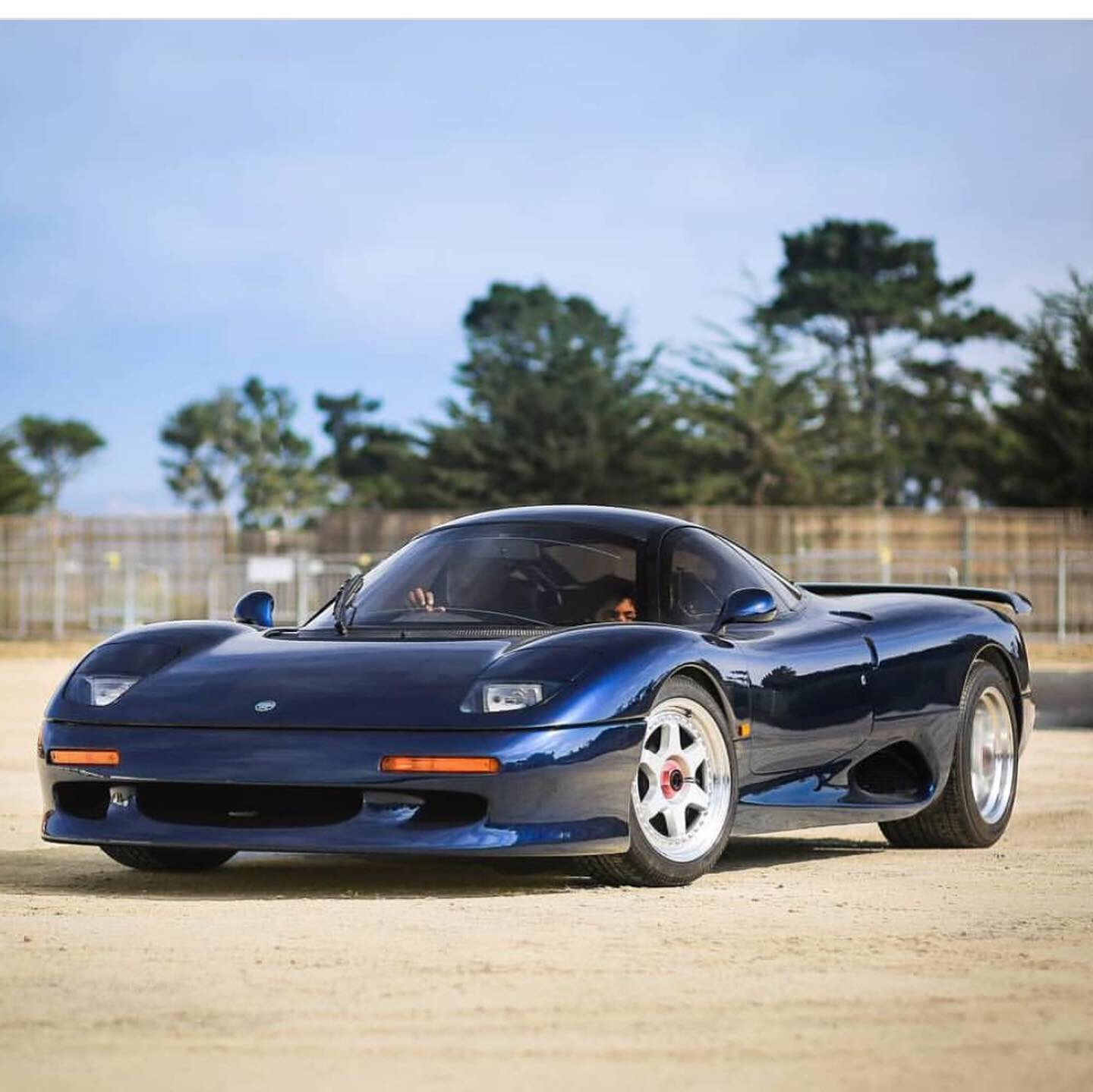
Jaguar XJR-15, the world's first road car built from carbon fibre

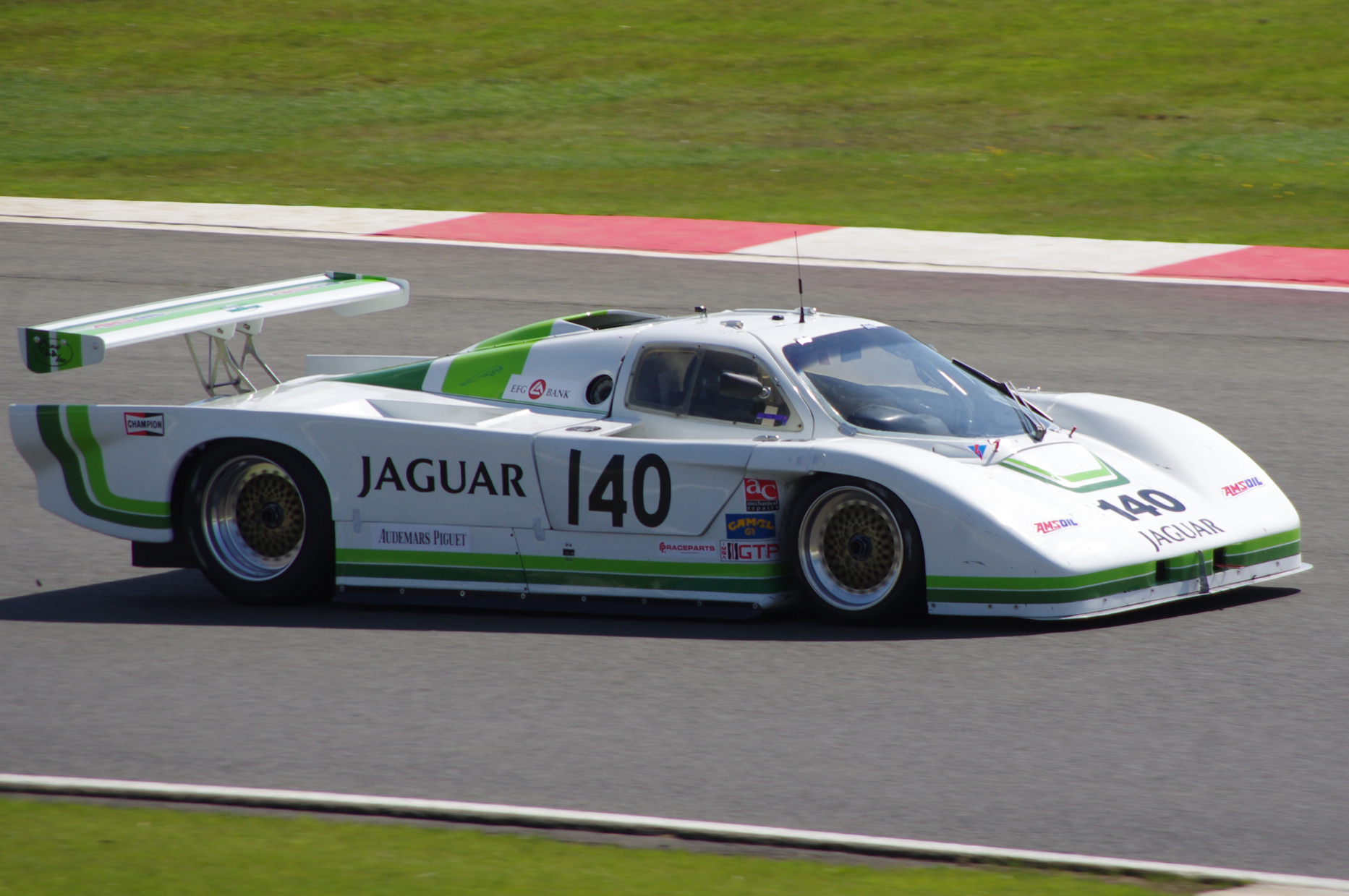
Jaguar XJR-5, the first prototype Jaguar to be entered into Group C sports car racing

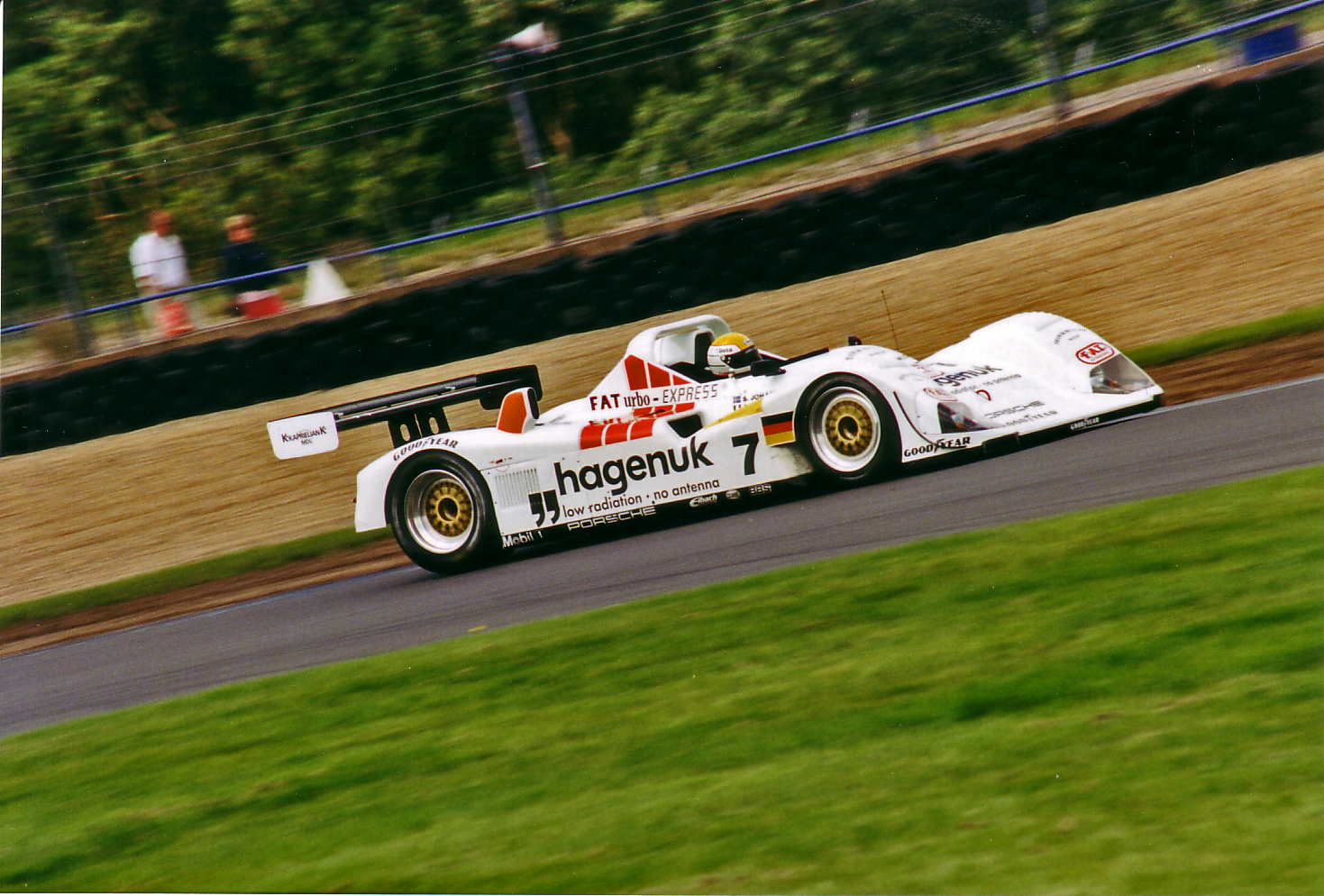
Porsche WSC-95

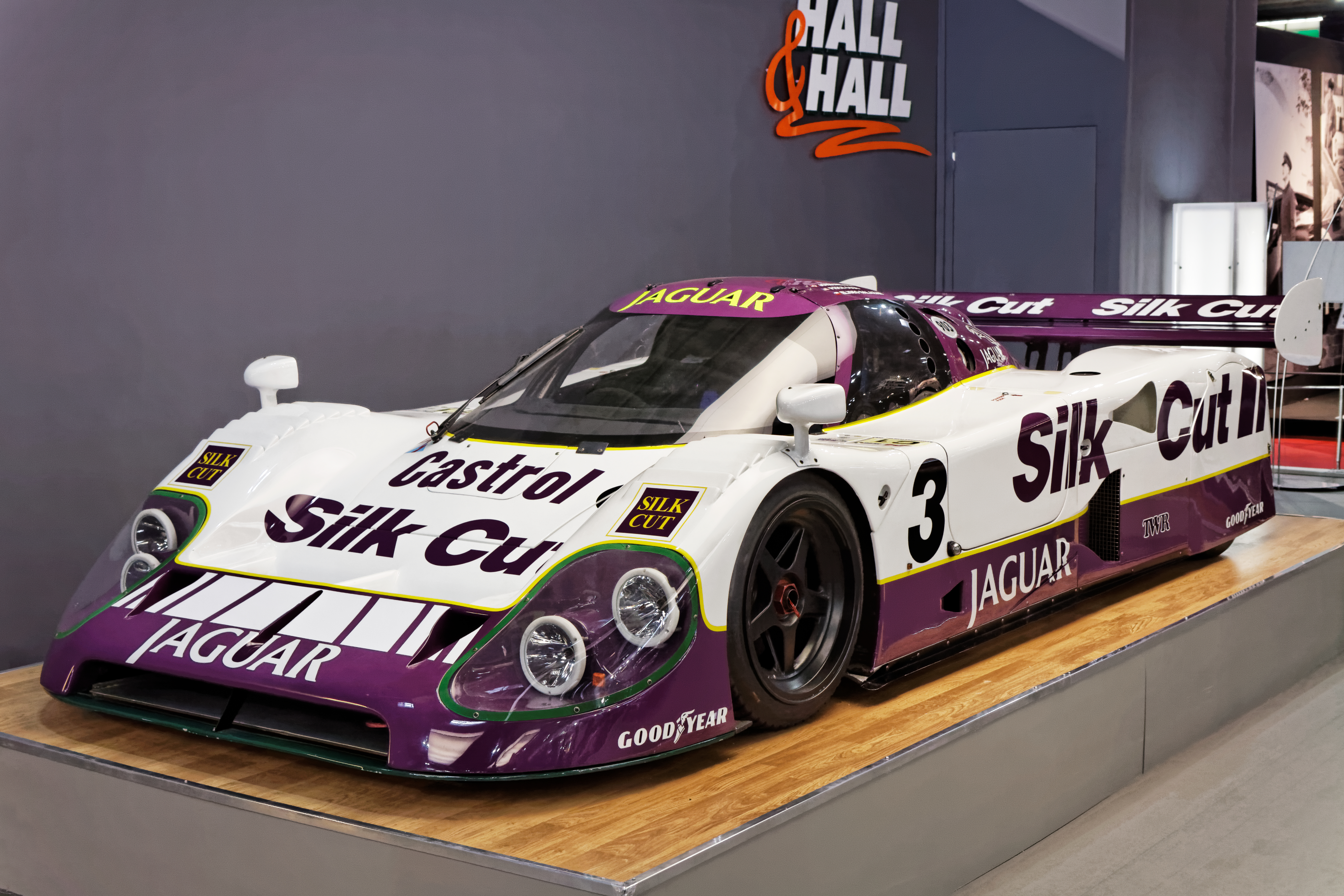
The Jaguar XJR-12, the last V12 powered sports prototype to win the 24 hours of LeMans

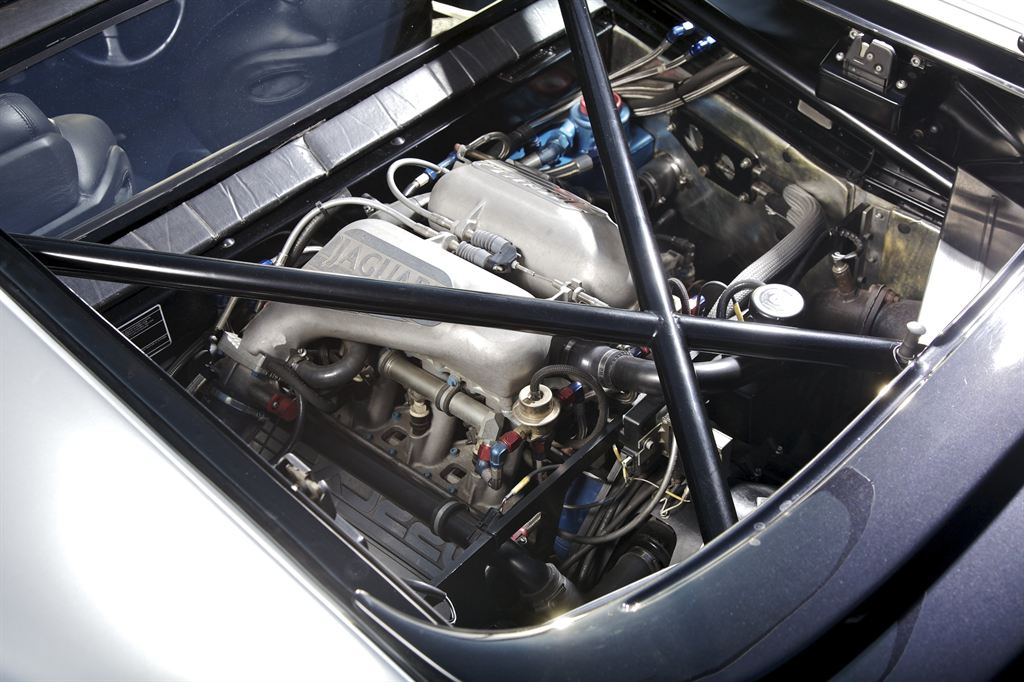
The JRV6 engine of the XJ220 was largely developed by TWR from the Austin Metro V64V engine.

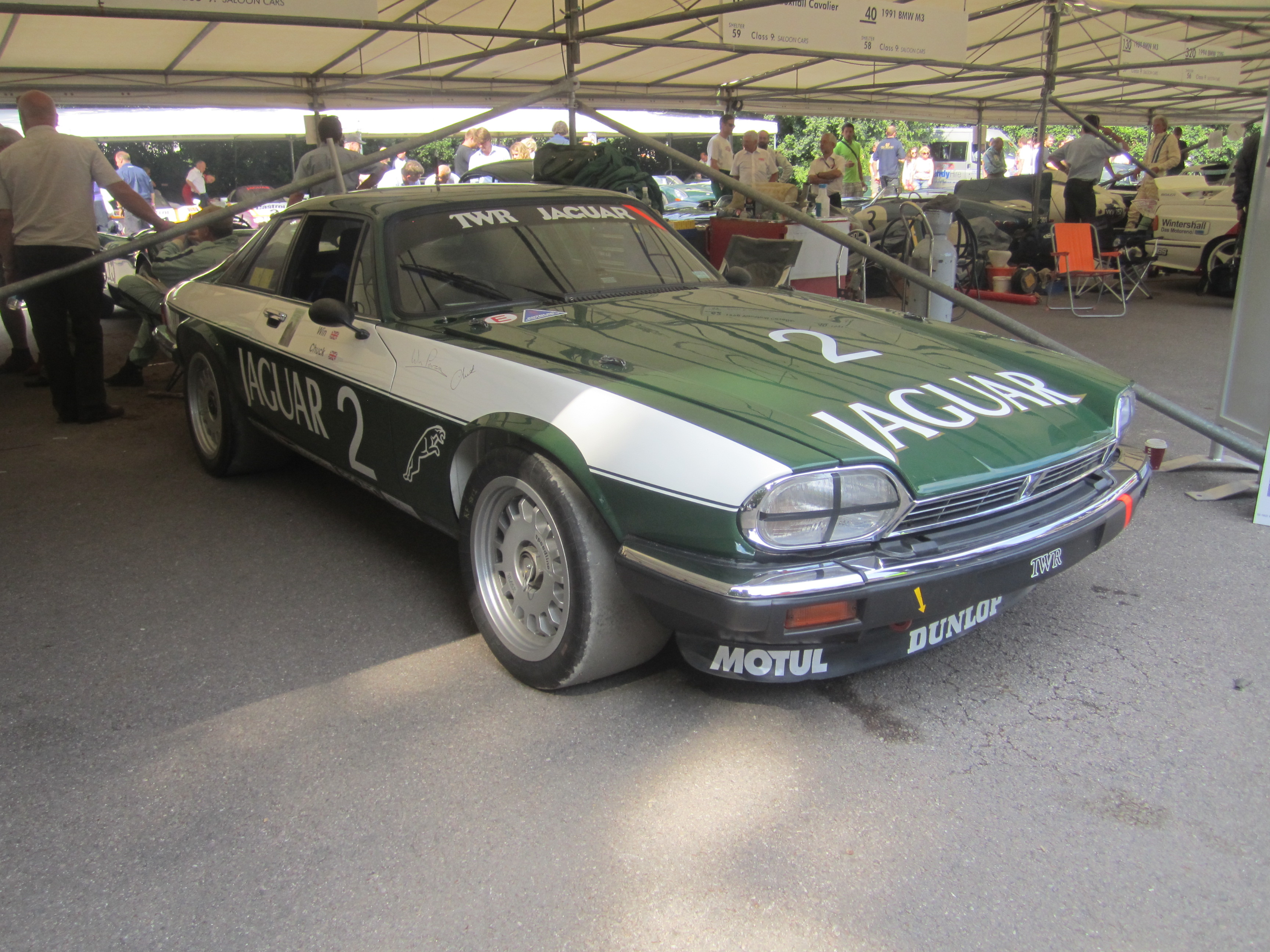
A 1984 Jaguar XJS Group A touring car
