= Jaguar XJR-15 =

Jaguar Sport XJR-15
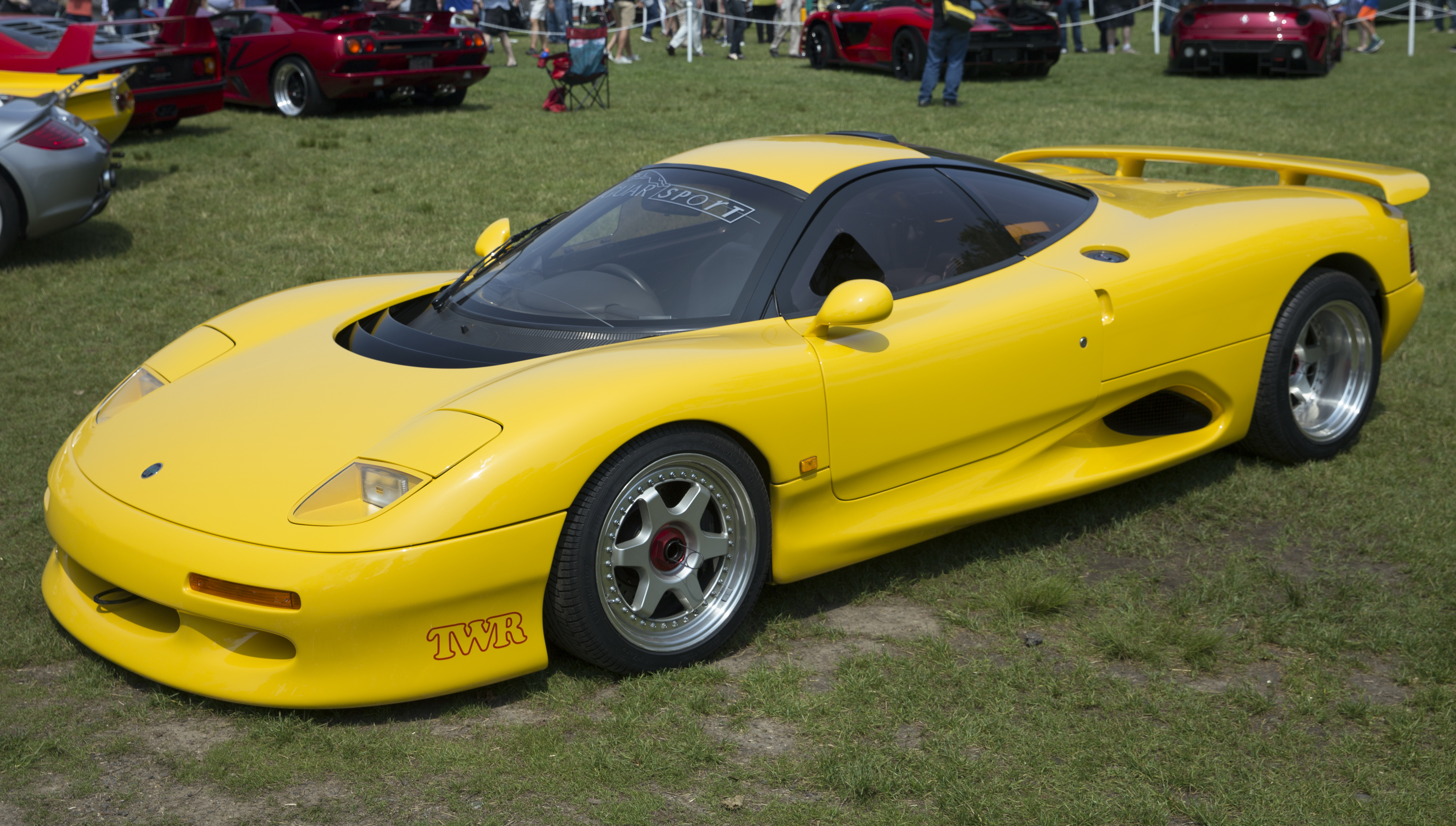

Overview
- Manufacturer: JaguarSport (a subsidiary of Jaguar operated by TWR)
- Production: 1990–1992 (53 produced)
- Assembly: United Kingdom: Bloxham, Oxfordshire
- Designer: Peter Stevens; Tony Southgate

Body and chassis
- Class: Sports car (S); Racing car
- Body style: 2-door coupé
- Related: Jaguar XJR-9; Nissan R390 GT1

Powertrain
- Engine: 6.0 L Jaguar V12
- Power output: 450 hp; 335 kW (456 PS); 569 N⋅m (420 lb⋅ft)
- Transmission: 5-speed manual; 6-speed manual (racing version)

Dimensions
- Wheelbase: 2,718 mm (107.0 in)
- Length: 4,800 mm (189.0 in)
- Width: 1,900 mm (74.8 in)
- Height: 1,100 mm (43.3 in)
- Kerb weight: 1,050–1,062 kg (2,315–2,341 lb)

Chronology
- Successor: Jaguar XJ220

The Jaguar Sport XJR-15 is a two-seater sports car of which a limited number were produced by JaguarSport, a subsidiary of Jaguar and Tom Walkinshaw Racing, between 1990 and 1992. Only 50 were planned (although 53 chassis were eventually made), each selling for £500,000.

The chassis was mechanically based on the Le Mans-winning XJR-9, designed by Tony Southgate. The body of the XJR-15 was designed by Peter Stevens, who went on to co-design the McLaren F1. The car competed in a single-make racing series called the Jaguar Intercontinental Challenge, which supported three Formula 1 races (Monaco, Silverstone and Spa) in 1991. The XJR-15 was the world's first road-car made entirely from carbon-fibre.

== History ==
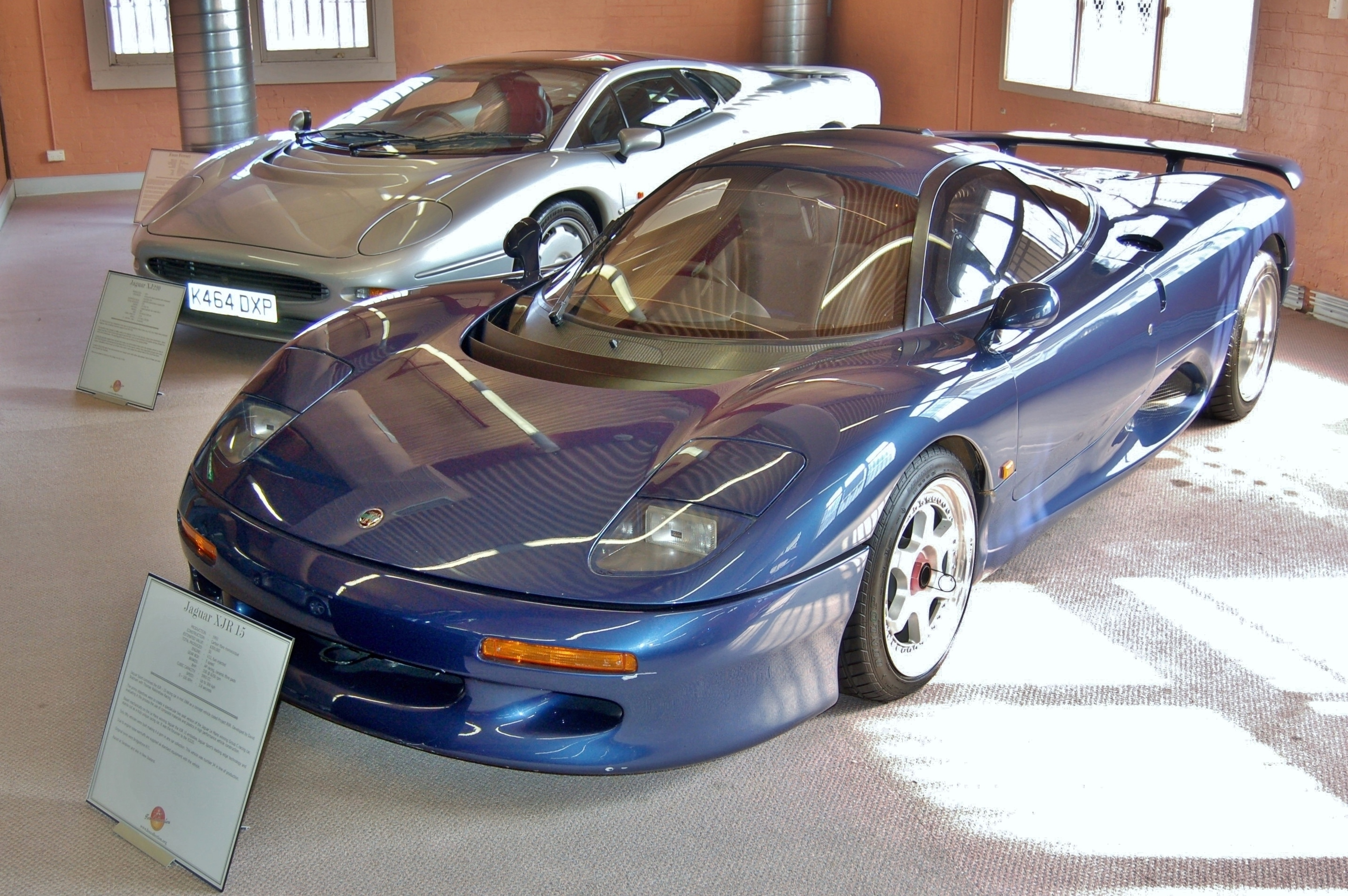
The XJR-15 shown together with its successor, the XJ220.

Tom Walkinshaw conceived the concept in 1988 after seeing the XJ220 concept at the British Motor Show. Following Jaguar's success at Le Mans, he enlisted Peter Stevens to develop a road-going version of the XJR-9, originally designated the R-9R. A number of wealthy racing enthusiasts were keen to own such a car and pressed Walkinshaw into manufacturing a 'road going racer'. This car was originally intended to be a better alternative to the XJ220. Original owners included Derek Warwick, Bob Wollek, Vern Schuppan, Matt Aitken, Andy Evans and the Sultan of Brunei.

In order to adapt the XJR-9 for road use, Stevens made a number of modifications to increase space and improve access. "Taking the race car as a base, we widened the cockpit by 75 mm (3.0 in) and raised the roof by 40 mm (1.6 in) to allow more headroom", he said when interviewed in 1991. "The scale model was ready by Easter 1989, from there we went to clay... which was finished by October (1989). The first prototype was held up by Le Mans preparations but it was ready for Tom (Walkinshaw) to drive when he came back from France in July 1990".

TWR explicitly developed the XJR-15 as a road-going racing car, in the mould of the Jaguar C and D types, the Ford GT40 and the Ferrari 250 GTO. As such, the car complied with British construction and use regulations and could be registered by the owner for road-use in the UK, although with such a limited production run, the car was never type-approved.

The car's production was announced in a press release on 15 November 1990 with an official launch at Silverstone early in 1991. The XJR-15 was built by JaguarSport in Bloxham, Oxfordshire, (a subsidiary of TWR; it was a joint venture between Jaguar Cars and TWR to produce high performance sports cars) England from 1990 to 1992 and had no official involvement from Jaguar itself.

== Design and reception ==
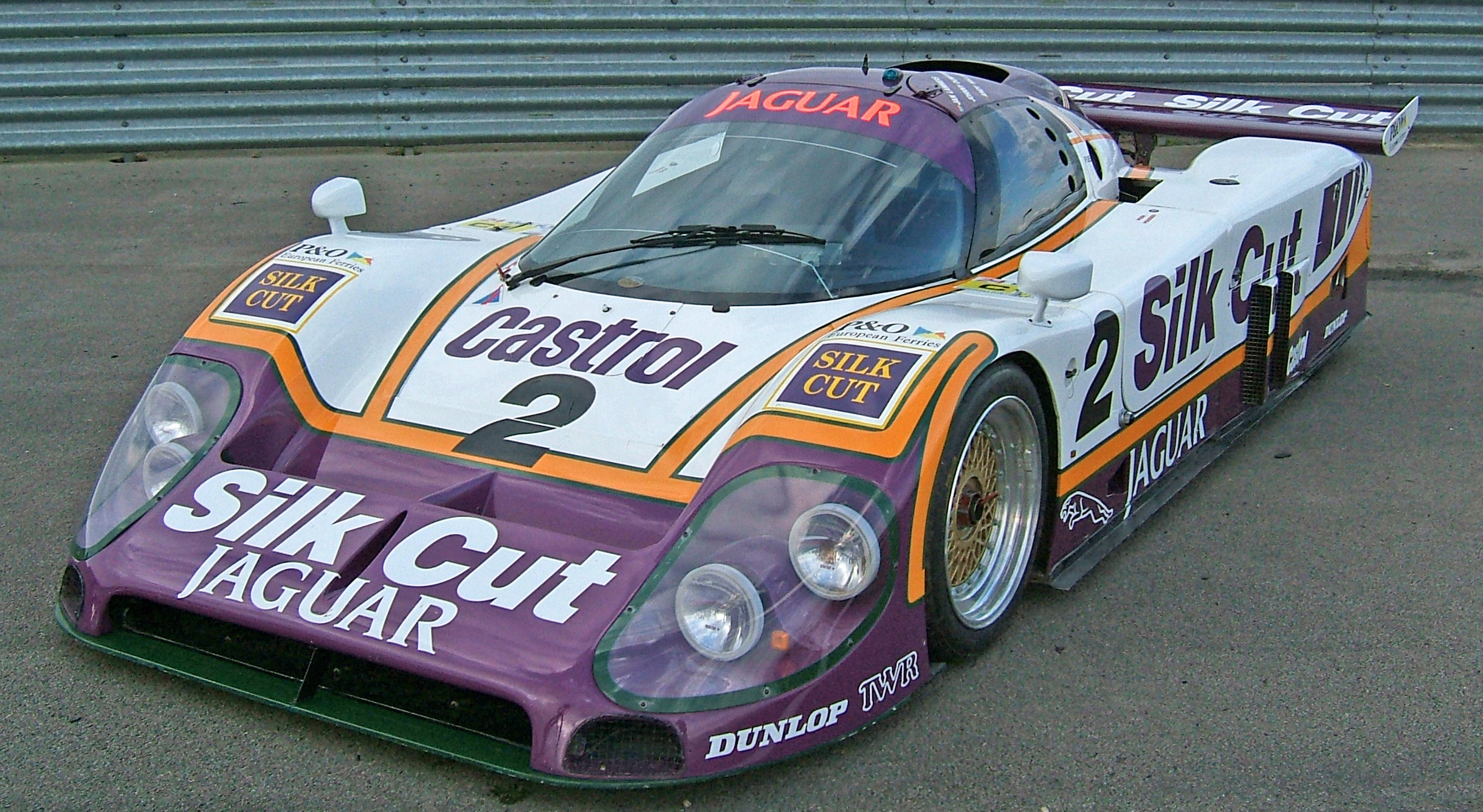
XJR-15 was derived from the Le Mans winning XJR-9 racing car, sharing many components

The XJR-15 is powered by a 5,993 cc (6.0 L) 450 hp (336 kW), naturally aspirated 24-valve Jaguar V12 engine. The engine features an advanced electronically managed fuel injection system with a very advanced (for its time) 'fly by wire' throttle. The standard transmission is a TWR unsynchronised six-speed manual transmission while a five-speed, synchromesh transmission was also available as an optional extra.

The XJR-15's chassis and bodywork are composed of carbon fibre and Kevlar (it was the first road-going car built entirely of carbon and Kevlar composites, before the McLaren F1 used similar construction techniques in 1992). The overall proportions differed from the XJR-9, with the XJR-15 being 480 cm long, 190 cm wide and 110 cm tall. The final weight amounted to be 1,050 kg (2,315 lb).

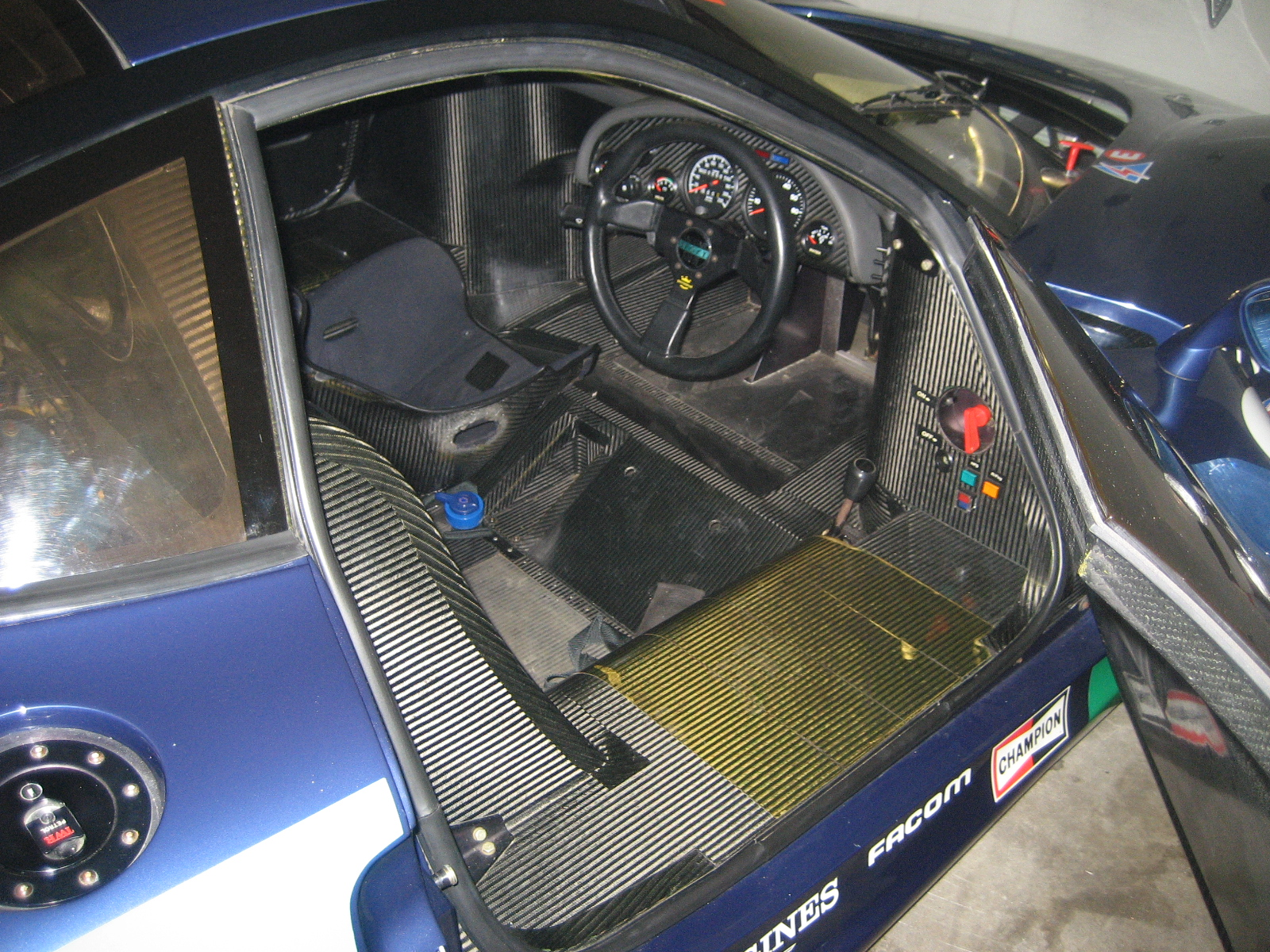
The XJR-15's interior is functionally minimalist with little to hide from its competition roots

A fully independent suspension was used, with non-adjustable Bilstein shock absorbers all round. Front suspension consists of wide-based wishbones and working push-rods to spring damper units mounted horizontally across the centre of the car. The car retains the rear suspension unit from the XJR-9 with vertical coil-springs mounted in units with uprights within the rear wheels, allowing for the maximum possible venturi tunnels. The engine forms a stressed member for the rear-frame. The bottom of the car is completely flat, in line with Group C practice.

The brakes are steel disc units with AP four-piston callipers.

The XJR-15 has a 0–60 mph (0–97 km/h) time of 3.9 seconds and a gearing limited top speed of 191 mph (307 km/h).

The ride height was somewhat higher than required to take full advantage of under-body aerodynamics due to the road going nature of the car. Additionally, the suspension was softer than would be found on the XJR-9 racer and - in a last-minute deal - Tom Walkinshaw switched tyre suppliers from Goodyear to Bridgestone just before the race series started. When interviewed by Autosport in 2011, Ian Flux recalled: "The worst thing was that Tom had done a deal with Bridgestone. At first, it was going to be on road tyres, but then they changed to slicks and wets. The fronts weren't a problem, but they didn't have moulds for the rears, so used F40 moulds instead. They went off very quickly and it was hard to judge how hard to push."

As Tiff Needell, who road-tested a development car at Silverstone early in 1991, put it: "the result is oversteer". However, once accustomed to the characteristics, he went on: "Through the very tight chicane, the XJR-15 showed excellent change of direction and I was able to pick up power early for the long right hander leading up to Beckett's. This gradually became a long right-hand power slide as my confidence increased."

As a road-car, the suspension was more softly set-up and with the right tyres, testers were unanimous in their praise. Ian Kuah, writing in World Sports Cars in 1992: "Considering its racing pedigree, ride quality is pretty good - at low speeds, better than a Ferrari 348...Levels of grip are far beyond those transgressed by any sane man, except perhaps when exiting a tight corner in a low gear when the sheer grunt pushing you through can persuade the huge Bridgestones to relinquish some grip. Seat of the pants feel and communication is terrific and the steering nicely weighted so that smooth inputs are easy. When it comes to stopping, the huge AP Racing brakes - with softer pads for road use - wash off speed with steely determination."

Ron Grable, the racing driver, writing in Motor Trend in May 1992: "As the engine sprang into a muted rumbling idle, it was impossible to keep from grinning. Easing the unsynchronised six-speed into gear, I accelerated onto the straight. Many race cars are diabolical to get moving...not so the Jag, the smooth V-12 pulled cleanly away, nearly as docile as a street-car. On the track, the XJR-15 is a truly wonderful ride, the perfect compromise between racing and street. You can say the savage edge of a pure race car has been softened slightly, or conversely, that it's the best handling street car you can imagine. Being 100% composite, it's so light that every aspect of performance is enhanced. Relatively low spring and roll rates are enough to keep it stable in pitch and roll, as well as deliver a high level of ride compliance. The brakes are phenomenal and the acceleration fierce. And always, there's that V-12, a medley of mechanical noises superimposed over the raucous rise and fall of the exhaust."

The XJR-15 offers little in the way of practicality. Entry to the car, over a wide sill, requires the driver to step onto the driving seat. The gear-lever is mounted on the right-hand side of the driver (all cars are right-hand-drive), while the driver and passenger seat are extremely close together - almost central in the car. Due to minimal sound insulation, an in-car head-set system is fitted. There is no storage space in the car due to its racecar-like nature. However, considering the purpose for which it was intended, the interior was highly praised in contemporary automotive press publications. Ron Grable wrote: "Aesthetically, the XJR-15's interior is breathtaking. Expanses of shiny black carbon fibre woven with yellow Kevlar are everywhere, all fitting together with meticulous precision. Instrumentation is detailed and legibly analogue. The shift lever is less than 3 inches (76 mm) from the small steering wheel, and the motion between gears is almost imperceptible. The reclined seating position provides excellent forward visibility - over the top of the instrument panel you see only racetrack."

== Technical specifications ==
- Engine
  - Type: Naturally aspirated 60° V12
  - Construction: aluminium-alloy block and heads, forged-alloy pistons, nitrided forged EN40B steel crankshaft with Holset harmonic damper, seven main bearings, cast-iron 'wet' cylinder liners, Cosworth pistons
  - Bore X Stroke: 90 mm × 78.5 mm (3.54 in × 3.09 in)
  - Valvetrain: Operated by Single OverHead Camshaft per bank of cylinders, 2 valves per cylinder
  - Fuel System: Zytek fuel injection and electronic engine management
  - Displacement: 5,993 cc (6.0 L; 365.7 cu in)
  - Compression ratio: 11.0:1
  - Max. Power: 450 hp (336 kW; 456 PS) at 6,250 rpm
  - Specific output: 75.1 hp (56.0 kW; 76.1 PS) per litre
  - Max. Torque: 569 N⋅m (420 lb⋅ft) at 4,500 rpm
  - Engine weight: 299 kilograms (659 lb) including clutch and accessories
- Transmission
  - The following data is for the TWR 5-speed manual (with synchromesh)
    - Gear Ratio 1st: 3.00 :1
    - Gear Ratio 2nd: 2.13 :1
    - Gear Ratio 3rd: 1.66 :1
    - Gear Ratio 4th: 1.38 :1
    - Gear Ratio 5th: 1.18 :1
    - Gear Ratio 6th: 0.91 :1
    - Final drive ratio: 2.90 :1
    - AP carbon triple-plate clutch
- Body
  - Body/Frame type: carbon fibre
  - Body/Chassis details: Carbon fibre and Kevlar composite construction monocoque chassis with engine used as rear suspension load bearer; lightweight composite and carbon fibre reinforced body with under-surface adopting ground-effect, venturi channels' to the rear and regulation flat floor (race trim)
  - Coefficient of Drag: 0.30
  - Weight distribution: 48% front, 52% rear
  - Wheels/tyres: 17-inch OZ forged alloy wheels (9.5 front/13 rear), Pirelli P Zero tyres.
- Performance
  - 0–60 mph (97 km/h): 3.2 seconds
  - Top speed: 191 mph (307 km/h)
  - Power to weight ratio: 429.39 hp (320 kW)/tonne

== Racing history ==
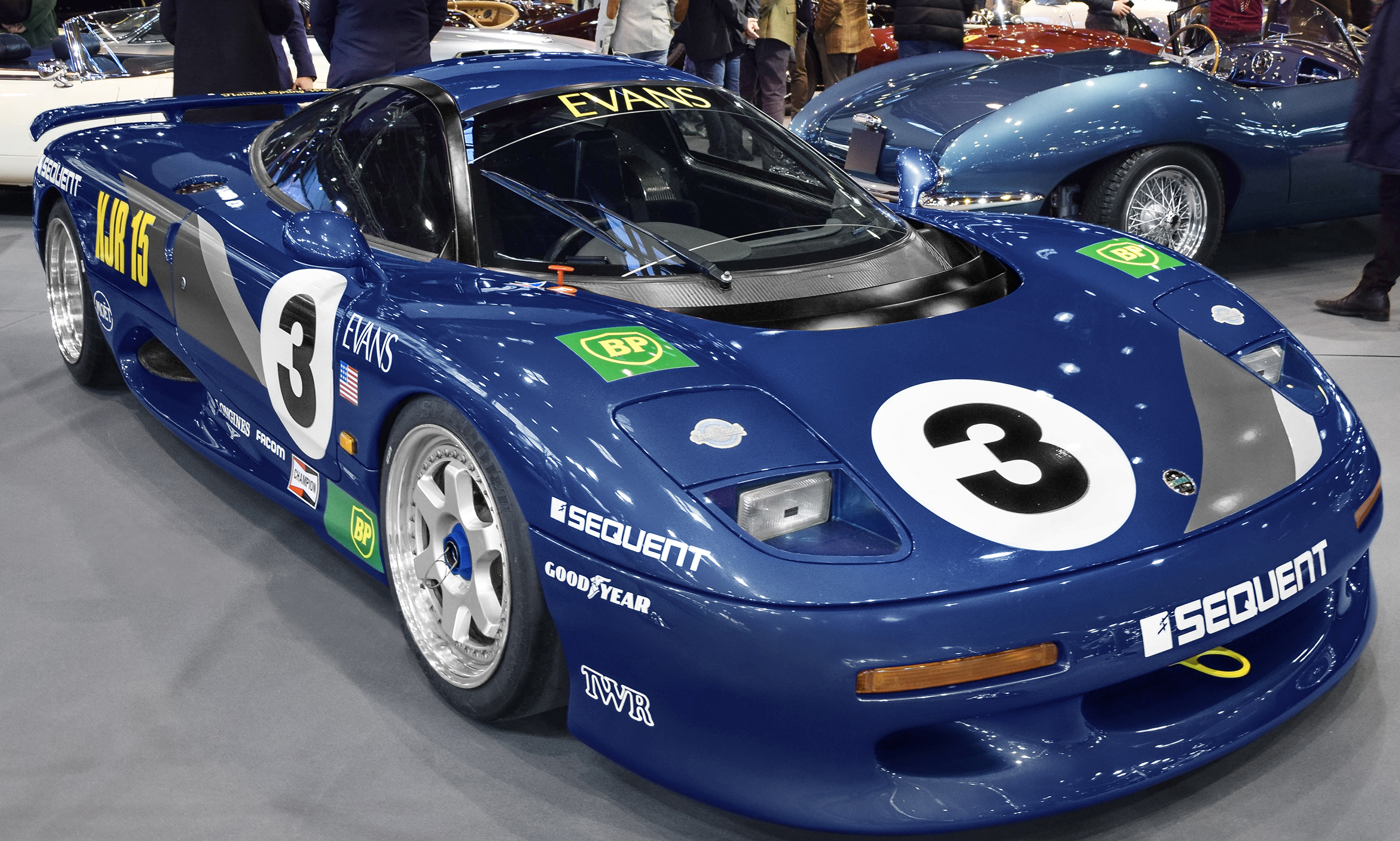
Jaguar XJR-15 race car

According to a press release by Jaguar Sport, a limited number of XJR-15s were built specifically to compete in the 1991 Jaguar Sport Intercontinental Challenge; a three-race competition held throughout the year as a support event for the 1991 Formula One Grand Prix at Monaco, Silverstone, and Spa-Francorchamps.

Sixteen cars built in racing specifications were entered in each of the events. The winner of the third and final race, Armin Hahne, was awarded a cash prize of US$1 million.

Having parted with nearly US$1m for their cars, most XJR-15 owners wanting to participate in the Intercontinental Challenge got professional drivers to drive the cars. Preparation and maintenance by Jaguar Sport was included in the purchase price of the race cars. At stake for the winners of the first two rounds were a pair of Jaguar XJR-S road cars whilst at the Spa finale there was a US$1m winner-takes-all prize fund.

A maximum of 16 grid slots were available for each event and all three were fully subscribed. Derek Warwick emerged on top of the timesheets in qualifying followed by Armin Hahne, Jim Richards, David Brabham and Davy Jones. Rounding out the top ten were Bob Wollek, Tiff Needell, John Nielsen, Ian Flux and Juan Manuel Fangio II.

Each race kicked off with a rolling start administered by Tom Walkinshaw and the charge into Ste Devote saw Warwick and Hahne touch several times before Warwick emerged in front. On lap two, John Nielsen ran wide at Tabac and thumped the barriers on both sides of the track before Hahne lost it entering the swimming pool on lap three, luckily emerging unscathed. This allowed Warwick to open up a four-second gap from Brabham, Jones and Fangio before losing it all after locking up into the swimming pool. The Englishman eventually finished seven tenths of a second ahead of Brabham after 16 laps of hard racing.

With the first race having enthralled the crowd yet passed without any major incident, hopes were high for another great spectacle at Silverstone. Warwick again started from pole with Brabham, Cor Euser, Ian Flux, and Wollek in fifth. Fangio, David Leslie, Hahne, Kenny Acheson and Needell also qualified in the top ten. The rolling start saw five abreast into the first corner but the opening lap passed with all 16 cars intact. On the second lap Nielsen and Jones engaged in some panel bashing at Becketts whilst at Stowe, second placed Warwick turned in on leader Euser. Warwick took the position, Euser spun (dropping to third) but Warwick's lead was short lived as he picked up a puncture, lost control and hit Brabham when making a pass.

Both men went into the pits for repairs. This left Euser back in the lead but his bonnet was gradually working loose which forced him to miss the apex at Beckets resulting in a spectacular 120 mph (190 km/h) spin. Now Flux was in the lead followed by Fangio and Hahne. By lap six Euser's charge back to contention suffered another setback when he hit David Leslie at Priory, both cars spinning as a result. Two corners later, Needell bumped Hahne out of the way to take third. Lap nine finally saw an end to Euser's afternoon when he hit Acheson and ended up beached in the gravel. Acheson was forced to pit. Competing for third, Needell and Hahne had another coming together forcing both cars out of contention. At the front, Fangio took the lead when Flux missed a gear at Club and dropped to second ahead of Wollek and Win Percy. Wollek's tyres were still in great condition having driven steadily throughout and the American was able to reel in Flux, passing on lap 18. Fittingly, the race was won by Fangio precisely 45 years after his famous uncle's last win at Silverstone. At the end of the race, 11 of the 16 entries had suffered some kind of damage.

The final Intercontinental Challenge race at Spa was a big deal. With US$1m on the line for the winner, there had been much speculation about race fixing agreements between the drivers. To counter, Jaguar Sport decided the race would run for an undisclosed number of laps. All the drivers knew was that the chequered flag would fall after at least six laps.

Qualifying saw Euser on pole followed by Brabham, Warwick, Hahne, Percy, Will Hoy, Wollek, Leslie, Thierry Tassin and Flux all in the top ten. However, only fourth place Hahne and newcomer Tassin had saved a spare set of fresh tyres for race day. The rolling start went off without a hitch until Brabham had a big moment at the top of Eau Rouge dropping from second to seventh in the process. This left Euser, Hahne and Warwick to open up a gap at the front, the three drivers pacing themselves for the opening stint. There was plenty of action going on behind though, John Watson losing it at the end of the main straight, flying off the track backwards at 140 mph (230 km/h) and collecting Needell in the process.

On the next lap, Tassin and Percy had a coming together at the bus stop, Tassin ending up atop the barriers after a heavy impact. After six laps were up, the racing became more fraught at the front. Now up to second, Hahne seized the initiative when Euser went offline through Eau Rouge on the eighth lap. Hahne's momentum took him through down the main straight and third place Warwick had eyes on second but dicing with Euser allowed Hahne to get away. Warwick then lost it at the sequence of corners before the bus stop, pin balling off the barriers and into retirement. From thereon in it was Hahne all the way and when the chequered flag fell at the end of lap 11, the US$1m prize was secure.

When interviewed by Autosport in February 2012 for 'Race of Your Life', Armin Hahne chose his XJR-15 win at Spa as career-highlight: "I qualified second to Warwick in Monaco but half-spun on oil while chasing him, so fell to fifth. At Silverstone I had a misfire and again finished fifth. At Spa, I managed to qualify second without using both sets of new Bridgestone slicks. I found a time good enough for the front row with my 'scrubbed' first set. At the start, I followed poleman Cor Euser for a few laps, but his tyres went off as he'd used them for the second qualifying session. I passed him - it was quite easy really. The race lasted 11 laps and I won by 3-4 seconds to collect the US$1m prize."

Results were:

Monaco 16 laps x 3,328 = 53.248 km

| Position | Race Number | Driver | Country | Laps | Time |
|---|---|---|---|---|---|
| 1. | 11 | Derek Warwick | GB | 16 | 29:52,438=106,945 km/h |
| 2. | 9 | David Brabham | AUS | 16 | 29:53,177 |
| 3. | 2 | Davy Jones | United States | 16 | 30:00,983 |
| 4. | 15 | Juan Manuel Fangio II | RA | 16 | 30:01,218 |
| 5. | 10 | Armin Hahne | D | 16 | 30:02,504 |
| 6. | 4 | Bob Wollek | F | 16 | 30:03,821 |
| 7. | 5 | Tiff Needell | GB | 16 | 30:23.722 |
| 8. | 6 | Jim Richards | NZ | 16 | 30:31.102 |
| 9. | 8 | Matsuaki Sanada | J | 16 | 30:58.803 |
| 10. | 7 | Cor Euser | NL | 16 | 31:10.506 |
| 11. | 12 | David Leslie | GB | 16 | ? |
| 12. | 3 | Andy Evans | United States | 16 | ? |
| 13. | 14 | Yojiro Terada | J | 16 | 31:21.066 |
| 14. | 16 | Ian Flux | GB | 15 | ? |
| 15. | 1 | Matt Aitken | GB | 13 | ? |
| DNF | 13 | John Nielsen | DK | DNF | - |

Silverstone 20 laps x 5,226 = 104.52 km

| Position | Race Number | Driver | Country | Laps | Time |
|---|---|---|---|---|---|
| 1. | 15 | Juan Manuel Fangio II | RA | 20 | 39:45,740=157,65 kmh |
| 2. | 4 | Bob Wollek | F | 20 | 39:50,050 |
| 3. | 16 | Ian Flux | GB | 20 | 39:56,320 |
| 4. | 12 | David Leslie | GB | 20 | 40:05,680 |
| 5. | 10 | Armin Hahne | D | 20 | 40:15,500 |
| 6. | 5 | Tiff Needell | GB | 20 | 40:19,920 |
| 7. | 3 | Andy Evans | USA | 20 | 41:01,660 |
| 8. | 9 | David Brabham | AUS | 20 | 41:25,940 |
| 9. | 8 | Kenny Acheson | GB | 20 | 41:41,750 |
| 10. | 14 | Yojiro Terada | J | 20 | 41:48,830 |
| DNF | 11 | Derek Warwick | GB | | |
| DNF | 6 | Win Percy | GB | | |
| DNF | 7 | Cor Euser | NL | | |
| DNF | 1 | Matt Aitken | GB | | |
| DNF | 13 | John Nielsen | DK | | |
| DNF | 2 | Davy Jones | US | | |

Spa Francorchamps 11 laps x 6,94 = 76,34 km

| Position | Race Number | Driver | Country | Laps | Time |
|---|---|---|---|---|---|
| 1. | 10 | Armin Hahne | D | 11 | 28:05,410 = 163 km/h (101 mph) |
| 2. | 7 | Cor Euser | NL | 11 | 28:09,820 |
| 3. | 6 | Win Percy | GB | 11 | 28:10,720 |
| 4. | 2 | Will Hoy | GB | 11 | 28:12,700 |
| 5. | 4 | Bob Wollek | F | 11 | 28:13,760 |
| 6. | 9 | David Brabham | AUS | 11 | 28:22,240 |
| 7. | 12 | David Leslie | GB | 11 | 28:26,690 |
| 8. | 16 | Ian Flux | GB | 11 | 28:28,690 |
| 9. | 8 | Pierre Dieudonné | B | 11 | 28:50,010 |
| 10. | 6 | Jim Richards | NZ | 11 | 28:52,640 |
| 11. | 17 | Jeff Allam | GB | 11 | 28:56,010 |
| 12. | 3 | Andy Evans | USA | 11 | 29:01,500 |
| 13. | 5 | Tiff Needell | GB | 11 | 30:40,850 |
| 14. | 11 | Derek Warwick | GB | 8 | |
| DNF | 14 | Thierry Tassin | B | 4 | |
| DNF | 15 | John Watson | GB | 3 | |

Further developments

After Jaguar withdrew from sportscar racing in 1994, Nissan approached TWR to develop the R390 race car. TWR used the middle-section of the XJR-15's tub - the cockpit and greenhouse - for the R390, however the R390 used revised rear and front ends, a wider overall chassis, and a different suspension for better handling, as well as a new exterior design, and - obviously - a Nissan rather than a Jaguar engine. All four R390s finished in the top 10 at the 1998 Le Mans, in 3rd, 5th, 6th and 10th.

On 6 June 1999, the Aston Martin Owners Club ran the first ever Historic 'Group C' invitation race at Donington Park in the UK. Bryan Wingfield entered a XJR-15 (number 7, originally driven by Cor Euser in the Jaguar Intercontinental Challenge), driven by Brazilian ace Tommy Erdos, finishing 4th overall and 1st in class. In the inaugural season of the AMOC’s Group C Challenge that followed in 2000, with Tommy Erdos committed elsewhere, Bryan Wingfield enlisted motoring journalist Paul Chudecki to drive the XJR-15, on 21 May at Spa-Francorchamps finishing 7th overall and 3rd in class, on 4 June at Donington Park 9th overall and 1st in class, on 24 June at Silverstone 8th overall and second in class and on 9 July at Brands Hatch 6th overall and 2nd in class.

== XJR-15 LM ==
At the end of the production run of the XJR-15, TWR produced a limited run of more powerful variants in collaboration with a British automotive firm XK engineering designated XJR-15 LM for a Japanese customer. These cars had the 7.0-litre V12 shared with the XJR-9 with a power output upwards of 710 PS (522 kW; 700 hp). Bodywork alterations include a larger rear wing, an additional front splitter with air vents in the middle, a modified engine cover with additional vents in order for additional engine cooling and an air intake situated on the roof to aid in cooling the larger engine.

Very little is known about the LM variant due to non-availability of records, though there are photos to suggest that at least five cars were produced (three in dark green, one in white and one in the same blue as the standard car which is believed to be the prototype). The blue car was bought by a car collector in the UK sometime after 2013 making it the first XJR-15 LM outside of Japan, thus making the existence of such a variant known.

== See also ==
- Jaguar XJR Sportscars
