= Peter Stevens (car designer) =

British car designer (born 1943)

Professor Peter Stevens (born 1943) is a British car designer.

Stevens is one of the UK's best-known vehicle designers. He is currently a design consultant, teacher and lecturer.

Stevens trained at Central St Martin's School of Art and then, the Royal College of Art. He began his career in the 1970s as a designer at Ford, then Ogle design. He also began his long career as a tutor of Vehicle Design students at the RCA at this time . He spent five years as chief designer at Lotus Cars in the 1980s, where he developed the Esprit revision and designed the Lotus Elan (M100). He then designed the Jaguar XJR-15 and later in 1990 became Chief Designer at McLaren Cars. He was responsible for the design of the McLaren F1, launched in 1993. After a spell as chief designer at Lamborghini, he returned to the UK, undertaking consultancy for Prodrive, BMW, Williams and Toyota. Alongside his automotive design consultancy, he became Visiting Professor of Vehicle Design at the Royal College of Art, London, until October 2014. He was appointed as design director at the MG Rover Group in 2000.

As consultant director of design for Mahindra & Mahindra in India, from 2005, Stevens oversaw the introduction of the M&M GIO and the sell-out Mahindra XUV500.

From 2011-12, Stevens was director of design, at Rivian Automotive, a green auto manufacturer located in Rockledge, Florida, USA.

Currently, Stevens is a consultant, designer and lecturer. He is involved in the design and application of hybrid technology, including a high performance electric race car.

Twice nominated as the UK’s Prince Philip Designer of the Year, Peter Stevens has won numerous honours for his work, including 2002 Automotive Designer of the Year by Autocar. His work includes creating road and race cars for McLaren, Lamborghini, BMW, Lotus, MG Rover and Prodrive. His well-known designs include the McLaren F1 road car, the 1999 Le Mans-winning BMW V12 LMR, the Lotus Elan, Subaru’s Impreza P1 and world rally series–winning WRC as well as Jaguar’s XJR-15.

Some of his designs include:

- Jaguar XJR-15
- Lotus Elan M100
- McLaren F1
- Lotus Esprit (redesign)
- Subaru '555' WRC Imprezas
- Subaru Impreza P1 and Prodrive P2 (also based on an Impreza engine)
- MG ZR, ZS, ZT, MG TF and MG TF GT concept
- MG XPower SV
- Rover 45, Rover 25 and 2004 facelift of Rover 75
- Rover TCV
- Rover Streetwise
- Rover 75 Tourer
