= Hydrolastic =

Automotive suspension system

Hydrolastic is a type of space-efficient automotive suspension system used in many cars produced by British Motor Corporation (BMC) and its successor companies.

Invented by British rubber engineer Alex Moulton, and first used on the 1962 BMC project ADO16 under designer Alec Issigonis, later to be launched as the Morris 1100.

== Description ==
The system replaces the separate springs and dampers of a conventional suspension system with fluid filled displacer units which are interconnected between the front and rear wheels on each side of the vehicle.

Each displacer unit contains a rubber spring, and damping is achieved by the displaced fluid passing through rubber valves. The displaced fluid passes to the displacer of the paired wheel, thus providing a dynamic interaction between front and rear wheels. When a front wheel encounters a bump, fluid is transferred to the corresponding rear displacer, then lowers the rear wheel, hence lifting the rear, minimising pitch associated with the bump. Naturally the reverse occurs when it is a rear wheel that encounters a bump. This effect is particularly good on small cars as their shorter wheelbases are more affected by pitching.

However, the key improvement over conventional suspension is that the front/rear interconnection allows the vehicle to be stiffer in roll than in pitch. Hence it is possible to design a compliant suspension - giving a comfortable ride - without suffering a penalty in terms of excessive roll when cornering. In roll, there is no transference of fluid from the displacers, and hence its internal pressure rises. The only "give" in the suspension occurs because of the inherent flexibility of the rubber springs. These are naturally stiff.

In pitch, as described above, fluid is displaced front to rear, and hence the pressure in the system stays effectively the same, and thus the suspension is much more compliant.

The design of the displacer units, and the way in which they are mounted means that as the suspension is compressed, the (roughly spherical) displacer deforms, and hence presents a larger area to the mounting plates. The pressure in the system is thus acting over a larger area, and hence applying additional force. This gives the suspension a sharply rising rate even in pitch, so that there is a strong tendency to return to equilibrium. Without this rising rate there would be no effective pitch resistance at all.

Cars with Hydrolastic suspension do, however, have a marked tendency to squat under acceleration, and to dive under braking (and for the rear end to sag under heavy loads). This requires clever design of the suspension components to minimise these forces, and to maximise the rising rate characteristic.

== Influences ==
Jon Pressnell suggests in his book that the hydropneumatic suspension of the Citroën DS motivated Issigonis and Moulton, who were at the time of the launch of the DS working on a rubber and fluid suspension system themselves. Pressnell also suggests that the complexity of the Citroën system encouraged Moulton to develop a much simpler system.

In a magazine interview for 'CAR' magazine in the late 1980s, Dr Moulton stated that he and Issigonis had also studied the Citroën 2CV in the 1950s, which featured fore/aft interconnected steel springs. They particularly wished to address the comical lack of roll stiffness of that car with the system that they were designing.

== Hydragas ==
Hydragas is a type of automotive suspension system used in many cars produced by British Leyland and its successor companies.

Invented by British automotive engineer Alex Moulton, Hydragas is an evolution of the previous Hydrolastic system. Manufactured under licence by BTR AVS under the Dunlop brand at the historic Holbrook Lane site. It was first introduced in 1973 in the Austin Allegro and was later fitted to the 1975 Princess and its successor, the 1982 Austin Ambassador. Both systems attempt to address the ride-handling compromise of car suspension by interconnecting the suspension of the front and rear of the car in some way. Hydragas attempted to perform the same function and advantages as the hydropneumatic system developed by Citroën, but without its attendant complexity.

The heart of the system is the displacer units, which are pressurised spheres containing nitrogen gas. These replace the conventional steel springs of a regular suspension design. The means for pressurising the gas in the displacers is done by pre-pressurising a hydraulic fluid, and then connecting the displacer to its neighbour on the other axle. This is unlike the Citroën system, which uses hydraulic fluid continuously pressurised by an engine-driven pump and regulated by a central pressure vessel.

Despite early problems (the Allegro version of Hydragas was found seriously wanting), it was gradually developed into an effective and efficient alternative to steel springs on later BL/Rover Group models such as the Austin Metro and MGF. The Metro originally featured independent Hydragas units, with no fore/aft interconnection (the pipework was deleted on cost grounds, against the advice of Moulton). While the Metro was praised for its handling, and offered a significant improvement in ride quality over the Mini, it was criticised for its tendency to pitch and bounce on uneven roads - precisely the characteristics the interconnection was intended to remove. The revised Rover Metro had its suspension interconnected and went on to receive plaudits for the quality of its ride.

The Austin Maxi was the only in production car to feature both systems. The Maxi featured 1100 designed Hydrolastic units with the regulator valve fitted with the interconnection pipe. However, in 1978 production of Hydrolastic bottles at Dunlop came to an end and BL modified the Princess Hydragas bottles to fit. This involved fitting a new front subframe design, with a larger diameter horizontal chamber in the subframe. MGF was the last vehicle platform to use this design. The Hydragas system was dropped in favour of conventional suspension by Rover when BTR AVS sought to increase the price of the units substantially. After servicing the spares market for some years a buyer was found and the production line was sold.

== Cars ==
Cars using the Hydrolastic suspension system:

- ADO16 Morris / Austin / Wolseley / MG 1100 / 1300, Riley Kestrel / 1300 & Vanden Plas Princess 1100 / 1300
- ADO16 Innocenti IM3 / IM3S / I4 / I5 (IT)
- ADO16 Austin Apache / Victoria (ZA/ES)
- ADO16 Morris 1500 / Nomad (AU/NZ)
- ADO15 Austin / Morris Mini & Wolseley Hornet / Riley Elf (from 1964 to 1971)
- ADO17 Austin / Morris 1800 / 2200 & Wolseley 18/85 / Six
- ADO17 Austin / Morris Kimberley / Tasman (AU/NZ)
- ADO14 Austin Maxi (until March 1978)
- ADO61 Austin 3-Litre
- Huffaker Indianapolis cars 1964-1969 "MG Liquid Suspension Special"

Cars using the Hydragas suspension system:

- ADO67 Austin Allegro & Vanden Plas 1500 / 1750
- ADO71 Austin / Morris / Wolseley 18–22, Princess & Austin Ambassador
- ADO14 Austin Maxi (from March 1978 onwards)
- ADO88 / LC8 Austin / MG Metro (not interconnected front to rear) & Rover Metro / 100
- MGF

== Bicycles ==
In 1962 Alex Moulton founded the Moulton Bicycle company to build his innovative design for small wheel bicycles. To ensure a safe and comfortable ride whilst using small wheels with high-pressure tyres Moulton fitted his bicycles with rubber suspension units similar to those used on the original Mini.

Later 'New Series' Moulton bicycles are fitted with rear suspensions systems marketed as 'Hydrolastic'. These are, in essence, miniaturised versions of the displacers used on Hydrolastic-equipped cars being a rubber cone spring with an internal fluid chamber to provide damping.
