= BMC ADO16 =

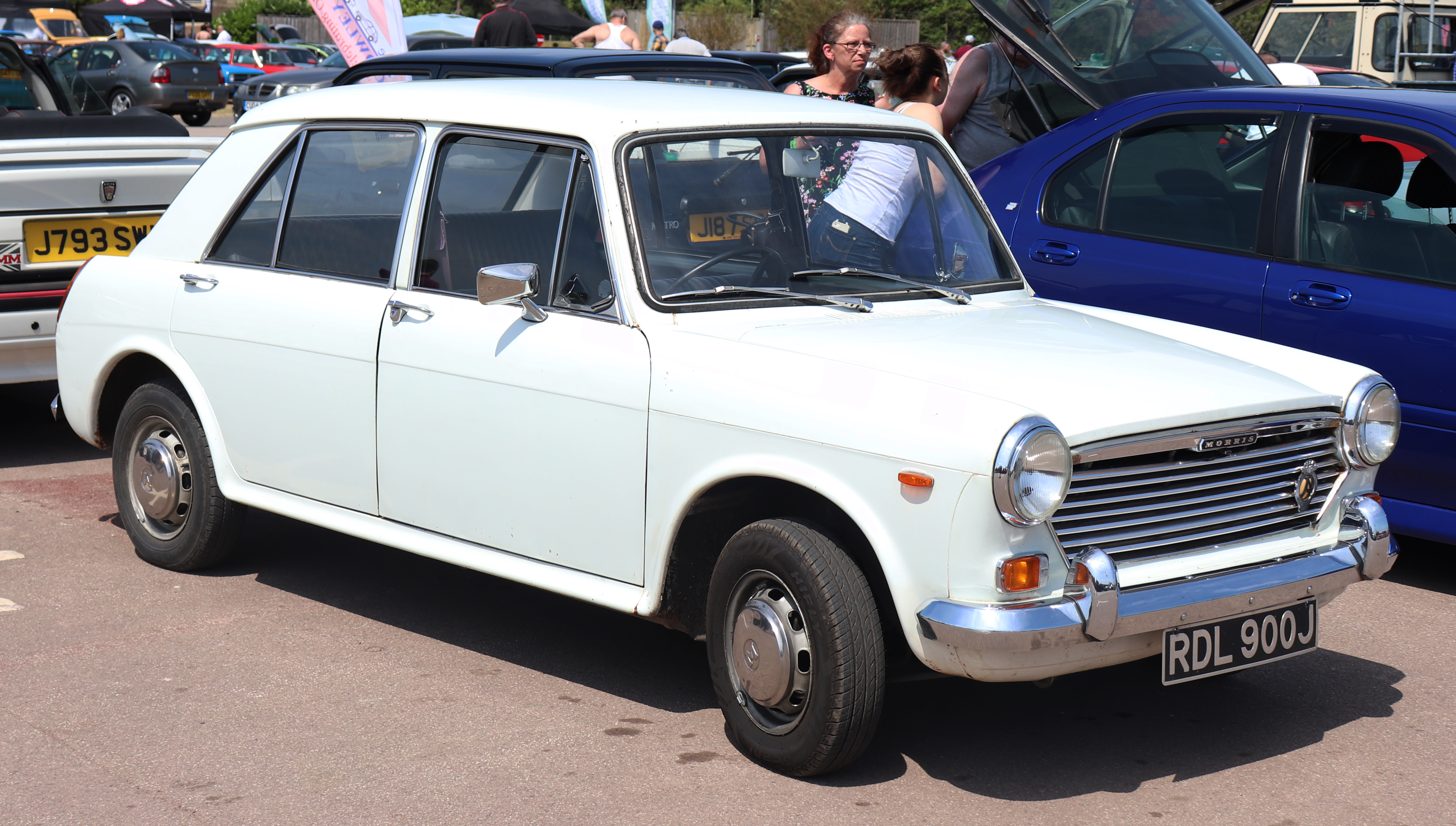
- Morris 1100 Mk.II four-door saloon

Overview
- Manufacturer: British Motor Corporation (1963–1968); British Leyland (1968–1974)
- Production: Overall: 1962–1974; Austin: 1963–1974; MG: 1962–1971; Morris: 1962–1971; Riley: 1965–1969; Vanden Plas: 1964–1974; Wolseley: 1965–1973
- Assembly: United Kingdom: Longbridge, Birmingham (Longbridge plant); United Kingdom: Cowley, Oxford (Cowley plant); Australia: Victoria Park (BMC Australia); Belgium: Seneffe; Chile: Arica; Ireland: Dublin; Italy: Lambrate, Milan (Innocenti); Malta: Marsa (Malta Car Assembly); New Zealand: Auckland; Petone (NZMC); Portugal: Setúbal; Rhodesia: Salisbury; South Africa: Blackheath (Leykor); Spain: Pamplona (Authi); Trinidad and Tobago; Yugoslavia: Novo Mesto (IMV)
- Designer: Sir Alec Issigonis body design: Pininfarina

Body and chassis
- Class: Small family car
- Body style: Four-door saloon; Two-door saloon; Three-door estate
- Layout: Front engine, front-wheel drive

Powertrain
- Engine: 1.1 L A-Series I4 (1100); 1.3 L A-Series I4 (1300); 1.5 L E-Series I4 (1500)

Dimensions
- Wheelbase: 93.5 in (2,375 mm)
- Length: 146.65 in (3,725 mm) (saloon & estate)
- Width: 60.38 in (1,534 mm)
- Height: 53 in (1,346 mm)
- Kerb weight: 1,834 lb (832 kg) approx

Chronology
- Predecessor: Austin A40 Farina; Riley One-Point-Five; Wolseley 1500
- Successor: Austin Allegro; Morris Marina; Vanden Plas 1500

The BMC ADO16 is a range of small family cars built by the British Motor Corporation (BMC) and, later, British Leyland. Launched in 1962, it was Britain's best-selling car from 1963 to 1966 and from 1968 to 1971. The ADO16 was marketed globally under various make and model names; the most prolific variant was the Austin 1100 and Morris 1100. At the height of its popularity, it was widely known as the 1100 (eleven-hundred) in its home market, or as the 1300 when equipped with the 1275 cc engine.

In production for 12 years, production of the ADO16 reached 2.3 million between 1962 and 1974, more than half of those sold in the UK home market. British Leyland phased out the 1100/1300 between 1971 and 1974 in favour of the Morris Marina and the Austin Allegro.

== Naming ==
The ADO16 was marketed under numerous make and models, including:

- Austin: 1100, 1300 and 1300GT
- Austin: 11/55, America, Apache, De Luxe, Glider and Victoria
- Innocenti: Austin I4 and Austin I4S
- Innocenti: Morris IM3 and Morris IM3S
- Innocenti I5
- MG: 1100, 1275 and 1300
- MG: Princess, Sports Sedan, 1100S and MG-S 1300
- Morris: 1100, 1300 and 1300GT
- Morris: 11/55, 1100S, Marina and Marina GT
- Riley: Kestrel, Kestrel 1275, Kestrel 1300 and 1300
- Vanden Plas: Princess 1100, Princess 1275 and Princess 1300
- Wolseley: 1100, 1275 and 1300
- Wolseley: 11/55 & Wasp

In line with BMC's policy at the time, Austin badged versions of the ADO16 were built at Longbridge, whilst Morris and MG versions were assembled at Cowley. However, some were also built in Spain by Authi, in Italy by Innocenti, in Yugoslavia (Slovenia) by IMV, and at the company's own plant in Belgium. It was the basis for locally adapted similar cars manufactured in Australia and South Africa. Various versions including Austin, Morris, MG, Wolseley and Riley were assembled in New Zealand and Malta from CKD kits from 1963 until the final Austin/Morris versions were discontinued in 1974, a year after the launch of its replacement, the Austin Allegro.

The vehicle was launched as the Morris 1100 on 15 August 1962. The range was expanded to include several rebadged versions, including the twin-carburettor MG 1100 (introduced at the end of September 1962), the Austin 1100 (August 1963), the Vanden Plas Princess 1100 (October 1963) and finally the Wolseley 1100 (1965) and Riley Kestrel (1965). The Morris badged 1100/1300 models were discontinued on the launch of the Morris Marina in 1971, but the Austin and Vanden Plas versions remained in production in the UK until June 1974.

The three-door estate version followed in 1966, called Countryman in the Austin version and Traveller in the Morris one, continuing the established naming scheme. The Austin 1100 Countryman appeared in the Fawlty Towers episode "Gourmet Night", in which the short-tempered owner of Fawlty Towers Basil Fawlty (John Cleese) gave it a "damn good thrashing". This episode was first shown in October 1975, and by that time it was already out of production.

In 1964, the 1100 was Wheels magazine's Car of the Year.

For most of its production life, the ADO16 was Britain's best selling car, holding around 15% of the new car market at its peak, before finally being outsold by the Ford Cortina in 1972.

== Design and development ==
The ADO16 (Amalgamated Drawing Office project number 16) was designed by Sir Alec Issigonis. Following his success with the Mini, Issigonis set out to design a larger and more sophisticated car which incorporated more advanced features and innovations. Pininfarina, the Italian styling studio that had worked with BMC before on the Austin A40 Farina, was commissioned to style the car. ADO16 had comparable interior space to the larger Ford Cortina.

In common with the Mini, the ADO16 was designed around the BMC A-Series engine, mounted transversely and driving the front wheels. As well as single piston swinging caliper disc brakes at the front, which were not common on mass-produced cars in the early 1960s, the ADO16 featured a Hydrolastic interconnected fluid suspension system designed by Alex Moulton. The mechanically interconnected Citroen 2CV suspension was assessed in the mid-1950s by Alec Issigonis and Alex Moulton (according to an interview by Moulton with Car magazine in the late 1990s), and was an inspiration in the design of the Hydrolastic suspension system for the Mini and Austin 1100, to try to keep the benefits of the 2CV system (ride comfort, body levelling, keeping the tyres in contact with the road), but with added roll stiffness that the 2CV lacked.

BMC engineer Charles Griffin took over development work from Issigonis at the end of the 1950s while Issigonis completed work on the Mini. Griffin ensured the 1100 had high levels of refinement, comfort and presentation. Griffin would later have overall responsibility for the Princess, Metro, Maestro and Montego ranges.

Autocar reports in October 1973, while the car was still in production, that approximately 2,365,420 ADO16s had been produced.

== Mark I (1962–1967) ==
The original Mark I models were distinctive for their use of a Hydrolastic suspension. Marketing material highlighted the spacious cabin when compared to competitor models which in the UK by 1964 included the more conservatively configured Ford Anglia, Vauxhall Viva and BMC's own still popular Morris Minor. Unlike almost all of its competitors, the AD016 featured front-wheel drive instead of rear-wheel drive.

The Mark I Austin / Morris 1100 was available, initially, only as a four-door saloon. In March 1966 a three-door estate became available, badged as the Morris 1100 Traveller or the Austin 1100 Countryman. Domestic market customers looking for a two-door saloon would have to await the arrival in 1967 of the Mark II version, although the two-door 1100 saloon had by now been introduced to certain overseas markets, including the United States where a two-door MG 1100 was offered.

An Automotive Products (AP) four-speed automatic transmission was added as an option in November 1965. In order to avoid the serious levels of power loss then typical in small-engined cars with automatic transmission the manufacturers incorporated a new carburettor and a higher compression ratio in the new 1965 automatic transmission cars: indeed a press report of the time found very little power loss in the automatic 1100, though the same report expressed the suspicion that this might in part reflect the unusually high level of power loss resulting from the way in which the installation of the transversely-mounted "normal" manual gearbox had been engineered.

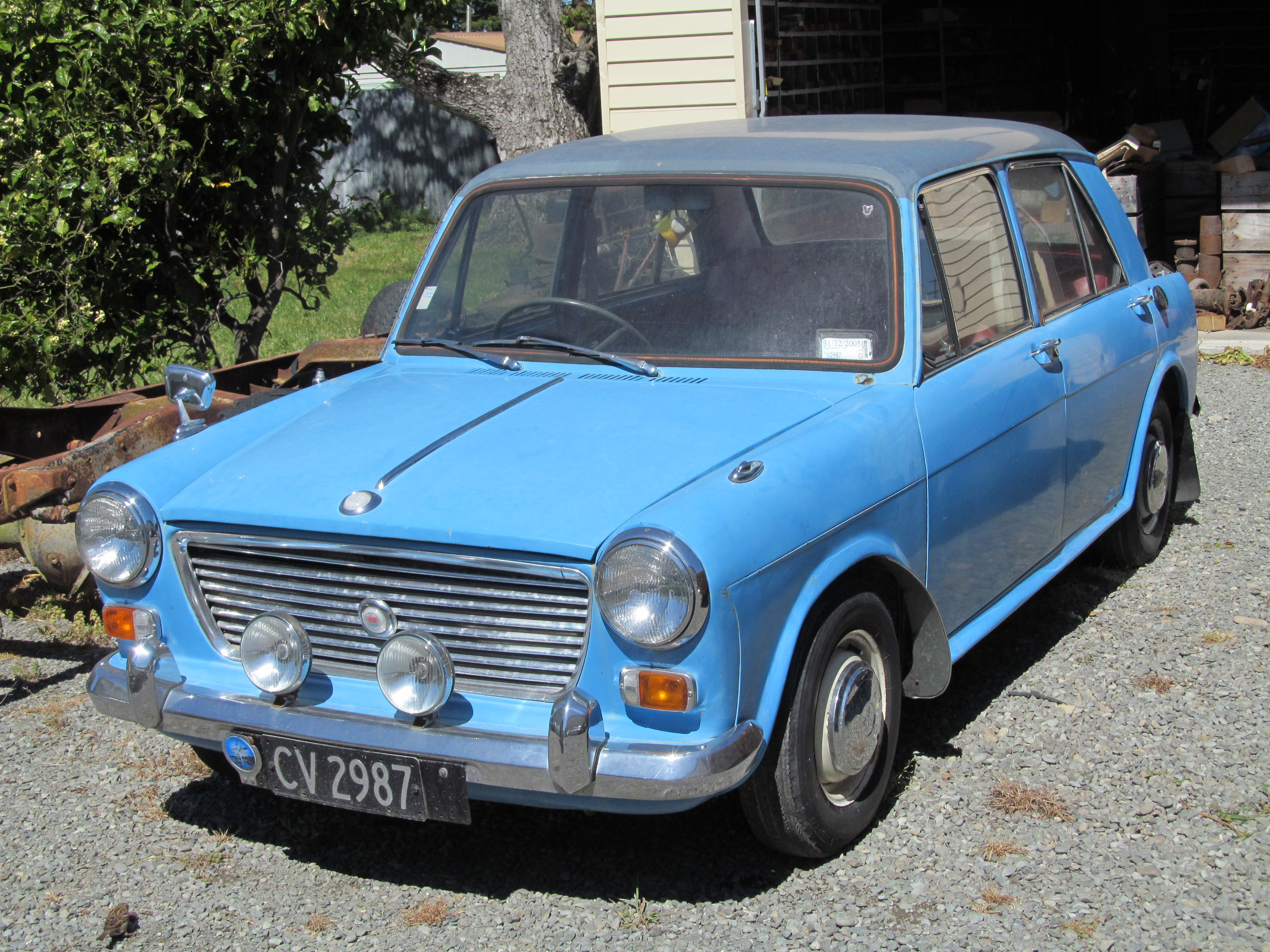
Morris 1100 Mk.I four-door saloon

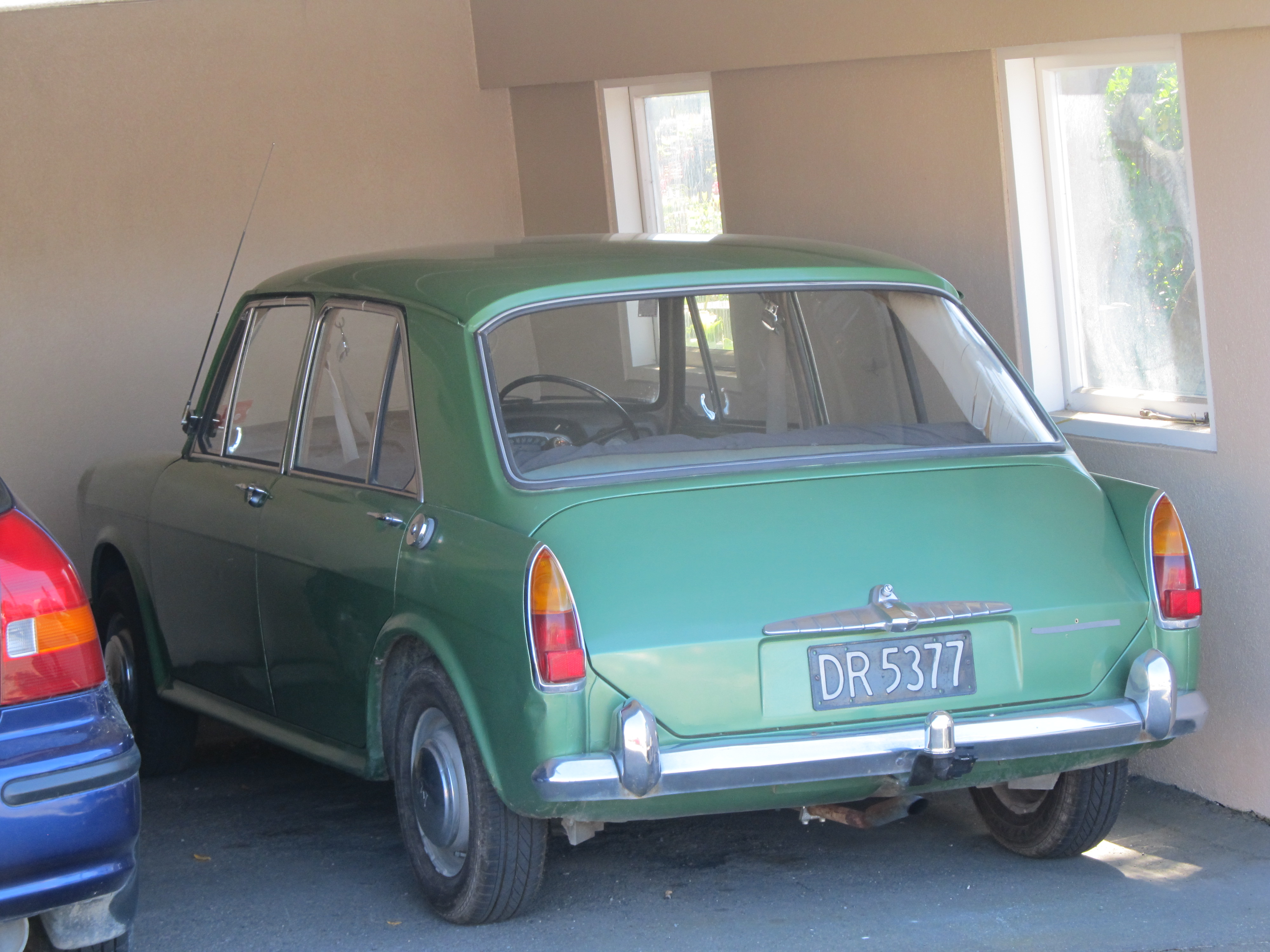
Morris 1100 Mk.I four-door saloon

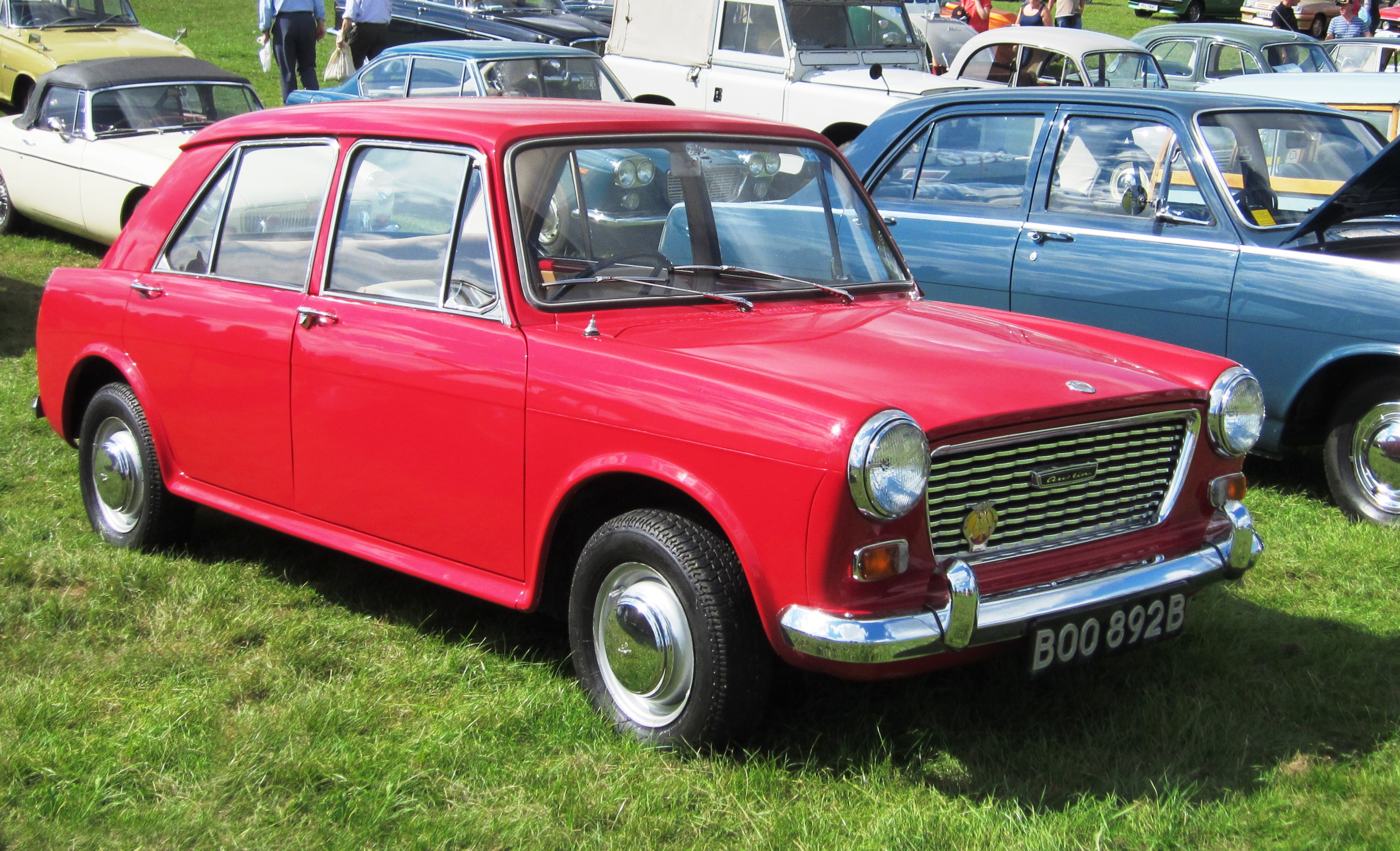
Austin 1100 Mk.I four-door saloon

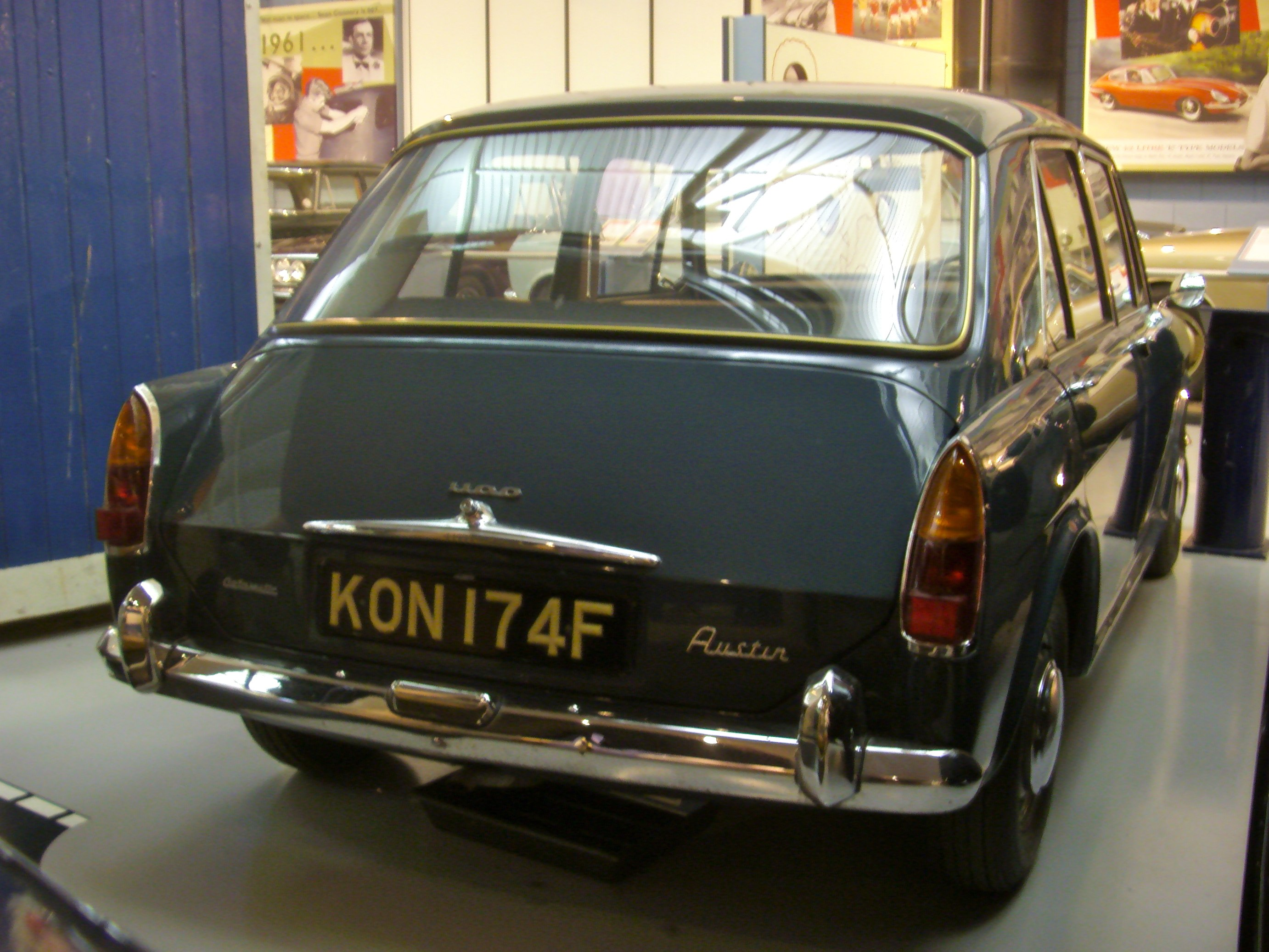
Austin 1100 Mk.I four-door saloon

MG 1100 Mk.I four-door saloon

=== Engine ===
- 1962–1974: 1098 cc A-Series I4

== Mark II (1967–1971) ==
At the end of May 1967, BMC announced the fitting of a larger 1275 cc engine to the MG, Riley Kestrel, Vanden Plas and Wolseley variants. The new car combined the 1275 cc engine block already familiar to drivers of newer Mini Cooper S and Austin-Healey Sprite models with the 1100 transmission, its gear ratios remaining unchanged for the larger engine, but the final-drive being significantly more highly geared.

The Mark II versions of the Austin and Morris models were announced, with the larger engine making it into these two makes' UK market ranges in October 1967 (as the Austin 1300 and Morris 1300). An 1100 version of the Mark II continued alongside the larger-engined models.

Unusually for cars at this end of the market, domestic market waiting lists of several months accumulated for the 1300-engined cars during the closing months of 1967 and well into 1968. The manufacturers explained that following the devaluation of the British Pound in the Fall / Autumn of 1967 they were working flat out to satisfy export market demand, but impatient British would-be customers could be reassured that export sales of the 1300s were "going very well". MG, Wolseley, Riley and Vanden Plas variants with the 1300 engines were already available on the home market in very limited quantities, and Austin and Morris versions would begin to be "available here in small quantities in March 1968".

The addition of a larger engined model to the ADO16 range came at a time when most cars of this size were now available with larger engines than the 1100 cc unit which until then had been the only engine available in the whole range. Its key rivals in the 1960s were the Vauxhall Viva (in HA form from 1963 and HB form from 1966) and the Ford Anglia (and from the end of 1967, the Anglia's successor, the Escort). From 1970, it had gained another fresh rival in the form of the HC Viva, and also from a new Rootes Group model, the Hillman Avenger.

On the outside, a slightly wider front grille, extending a little beneath the headlights, and with revised detailing, differentiated Austin / Morris Mark IIs from their Mark I predecessors, along with a slightly smoother tail light fitting which also found its way onto the FX4 London taxi of the time. Austin and Morris grilles were again differentiated, the Austin having wavy bars and the Morris straight ones. The 1100 had been introduced with synchromesh on the top three ratios: all synchromesh manual gearboxes were introduced with the 1275 cc models at the end of 1967 and found their way into 1098 cc cars a few months later.

Mark II versions of the MG, Riley, Vanden Plas and Wolseley were introduced in October 1968, at which time Riley abandoned the Kestrel name. The Riley 1300 Mark II was discontinued in July 1969, and signalled the demise of the Riley marque, proving to be a shade of things to come as the 1970s would see British Leyland discontinue the Wolseley marque and sell most of its model ranges under a solitary brand.

At the London Motor Show in October 1969 the manufacturers introduced the Austin / Morris 1300 GT, featuring the same 1275 cc twin carburettor engine as that installed in the MG 1300, but with a black full width grille, a black vinyl roof and a thick black metal strip along the side. This was BMC's answer to the Ford Escort GT and its Vauxhall counterpart. Ride height on the Austin / Morris 1300 GT was fractionally lowered through the reduction of the Hydrolastic fluid pressure from 225 to 205 psi.

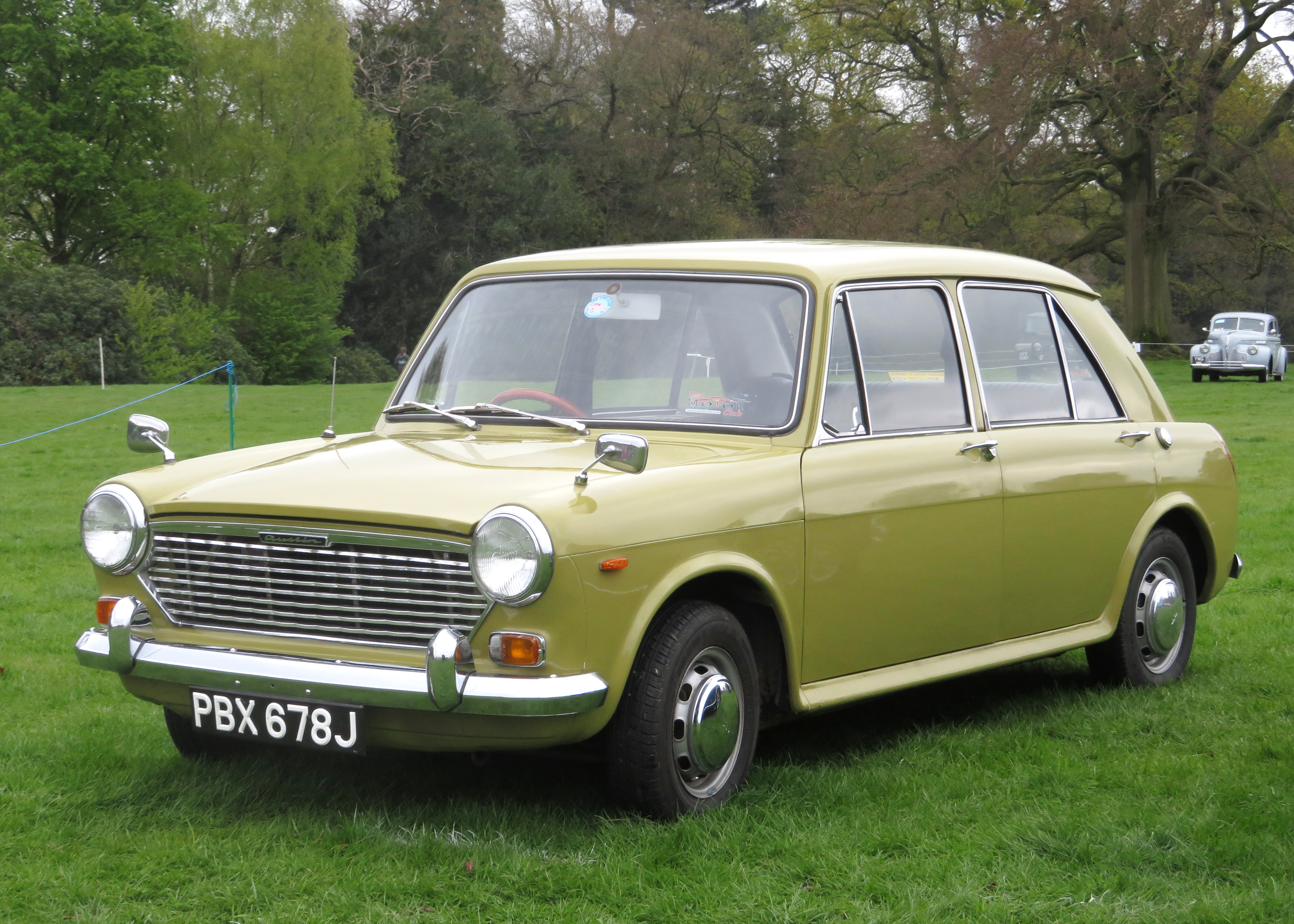
Austin 1100 Mk.II four-door saloon (Note the slightly wider grille)

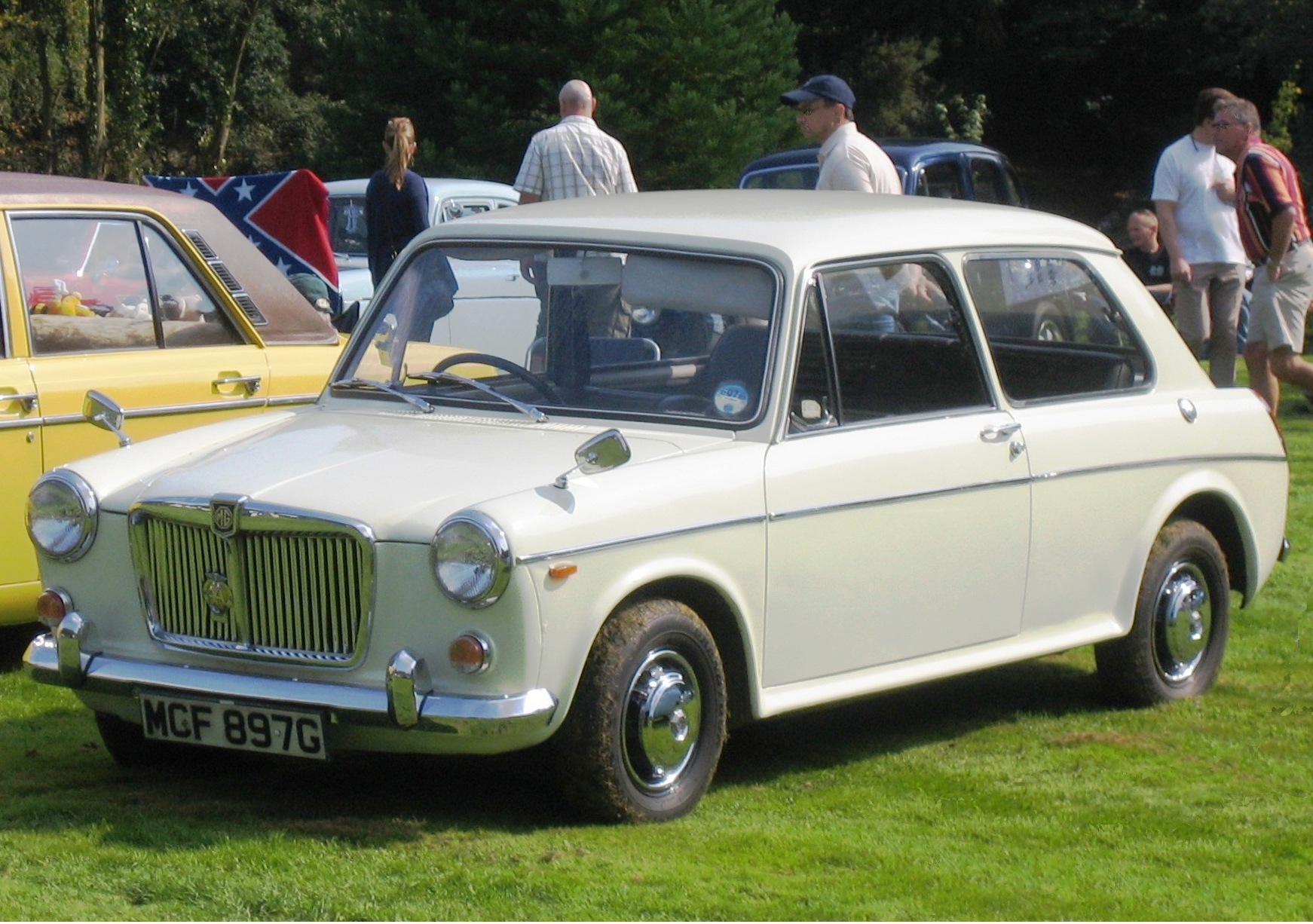
1969 MG 1300 Mk.II two-door saloon

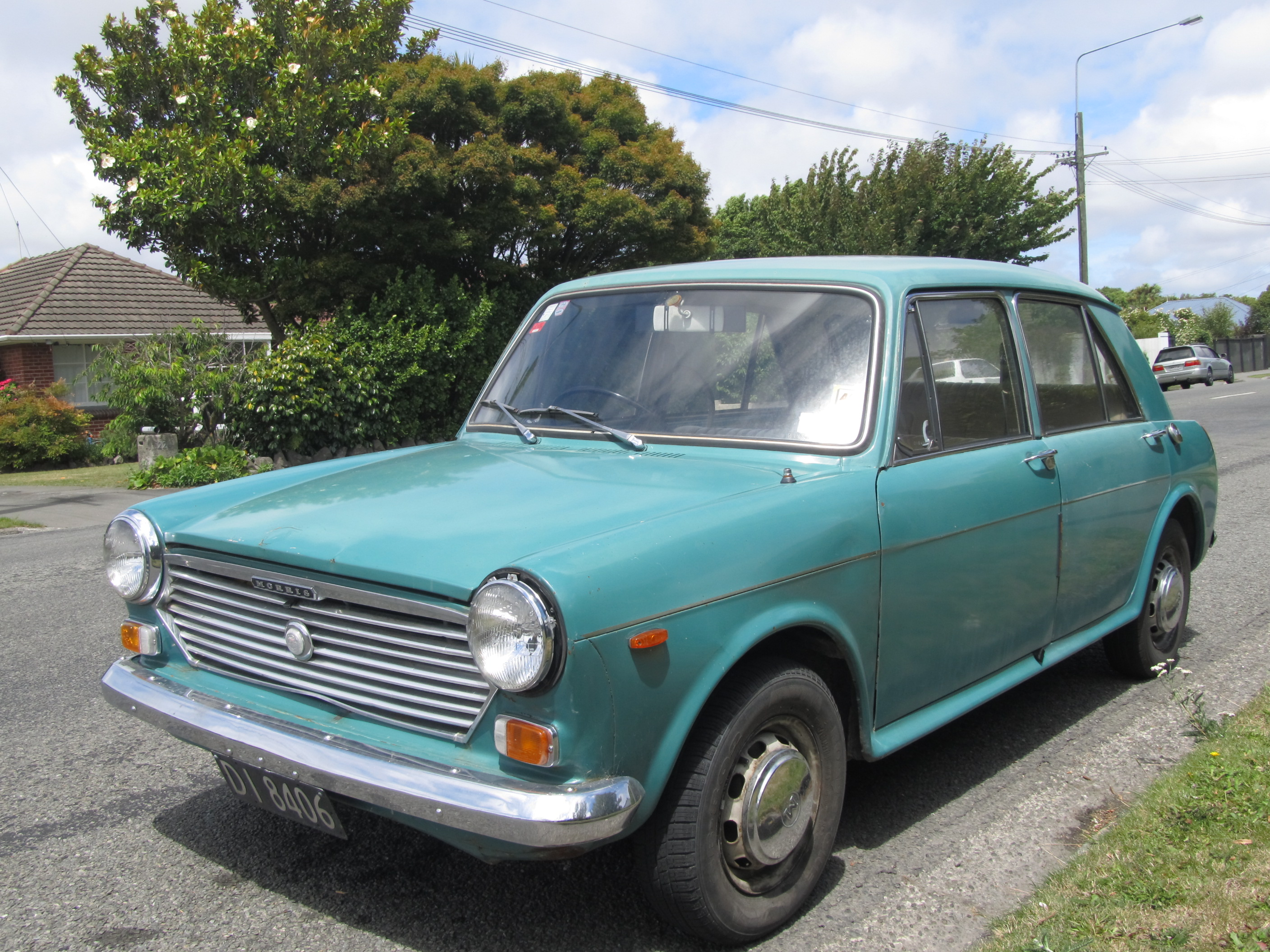
1970 Morris 1100 MK.II four-door saloon

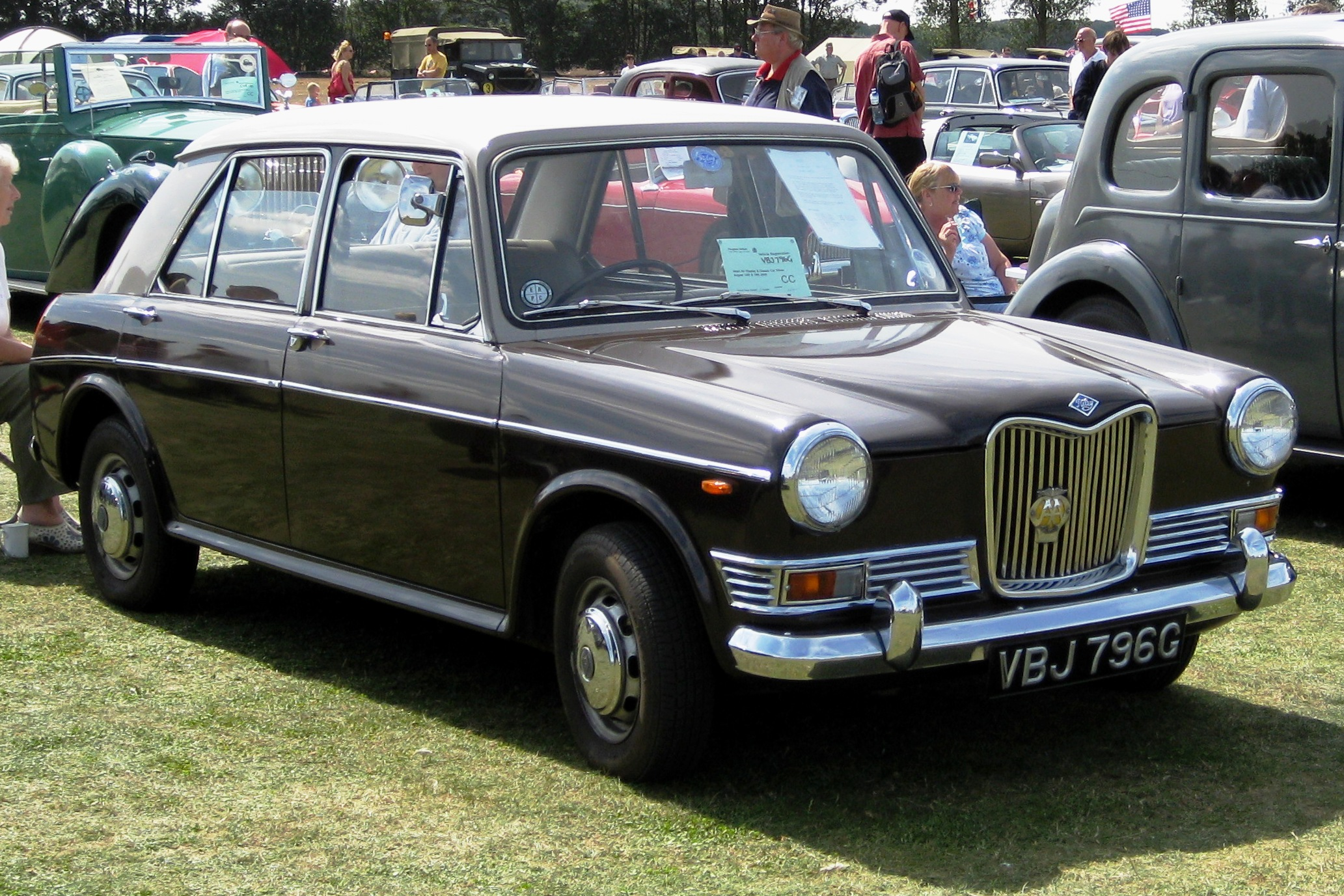
Riley Kestrel four-door saloon

=== Engine ===
- 1967–1971: 1098 cc A-Series I4
- 1967–1971: 1275 cc A-Series I4
- 1969–1971: 1498 cc E-Series I4

During 1970, despite being fundamentally little changed since the introduction of the Morris 1100 in 1962, the Austin/Morris 1100/1300 retained its position as Britain's top-selling car, with 132,965 vehicles registered as against 123,025 for the Ford Cortina, in that year entering its third incarnation. By the time the two millionth ADO16 was produced, at the end of June 1971, the Morris-badged version of the saloon car had been withdrawn in order to create space in the range and in the showrooms for the Morris Marina. 1971 turned out to be the 1100/1300's last year at the top of the UK charts. In Australia, a local adaptation put the E-Series engine into the car to create the Morris 1500.

== Mark III (1971–1974) ==
The Mark III models were introduced in September 1971. At the launch of the Morris 1100 in 1962 the manufacturer stated that they intended for the ADO16 models to remain in production for at least ten years, which despite BMC's vicissitudes through the 1960s turned out to be reasonably prescient. The range was gradually reduced, with the MG 1300 dropped in 1971 and the Wolseley 1300 in 1973. The final British ADO16, a Vanden Plas Princess 1300, left the factory on 19 June 1974. When British Leyland replaced the ADO16, it was replaced variously by the Austin Maxi (1969), the Morris Marina (1971), and the Austin Allegro (1973). The luxury Vanden Plas 1500 version of the Allegro debuted in 1975.

By this time, its original rival, the Ford Cortina, had long since grown larger, putting ADO16 into the small, rather than medium-sized class, which British Leyland was now competing in with the Austin Maxi, Morris Marina as well as the long-running Austin 1800 saloons. The ADO16's final key rivals were the Ford Escort, Vauxhall Viva and Hillman Avenger. Foreign cars were also becoming increasingly popular on the UK market during the early 1970s, with perhaps the biggest imported rival to the ADO16 being the Datsun Sunny from Japan.

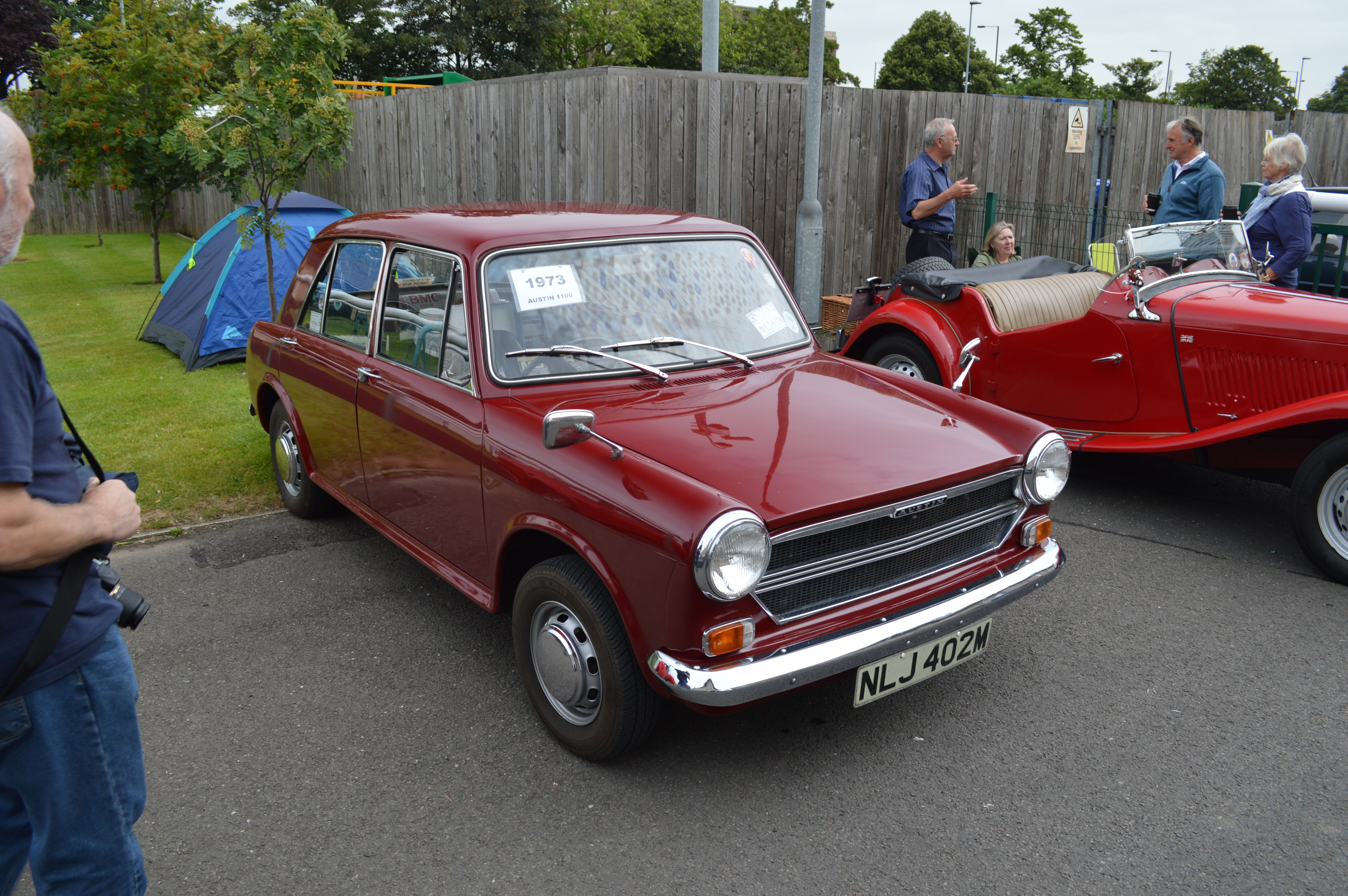
Austin 1100 Mk.III Super Deluxe four-door saloon

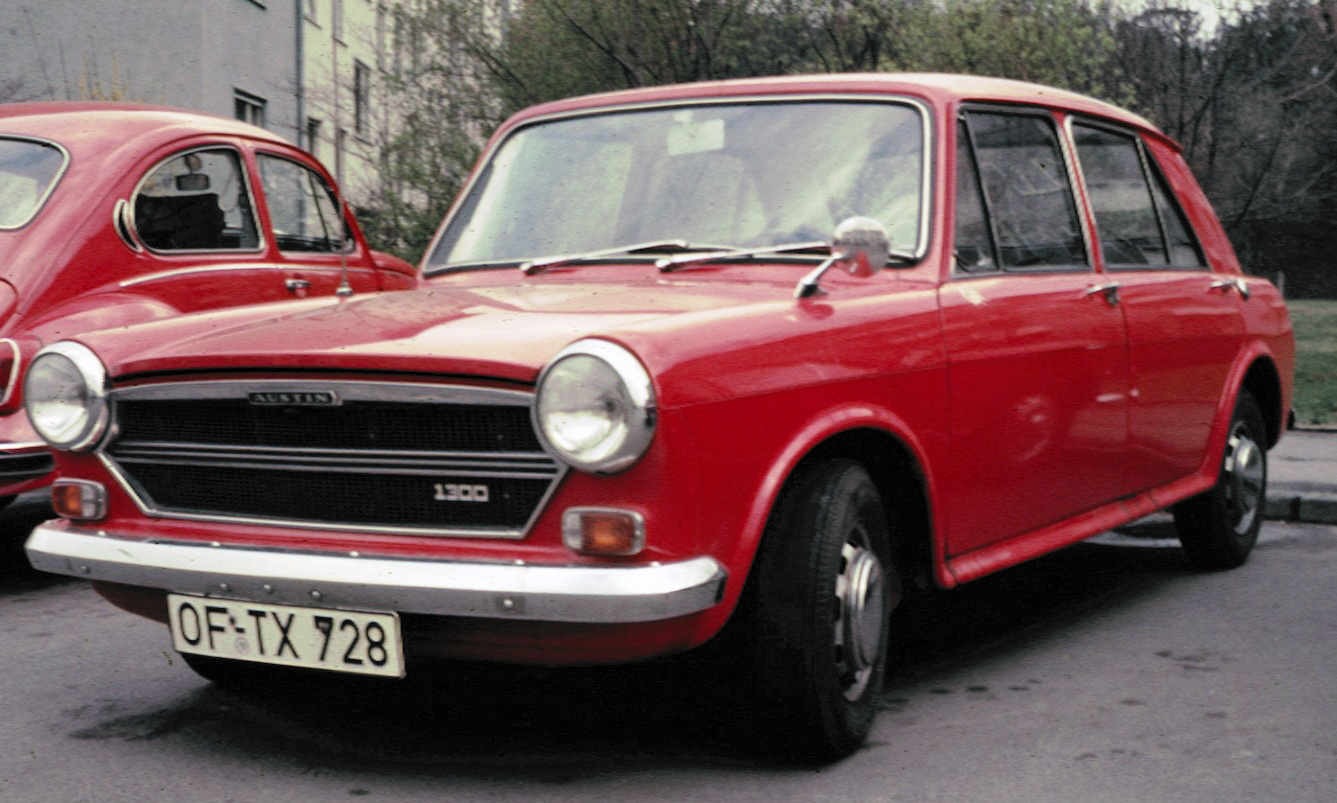
Austin 1300 Mk.III four-door saloon

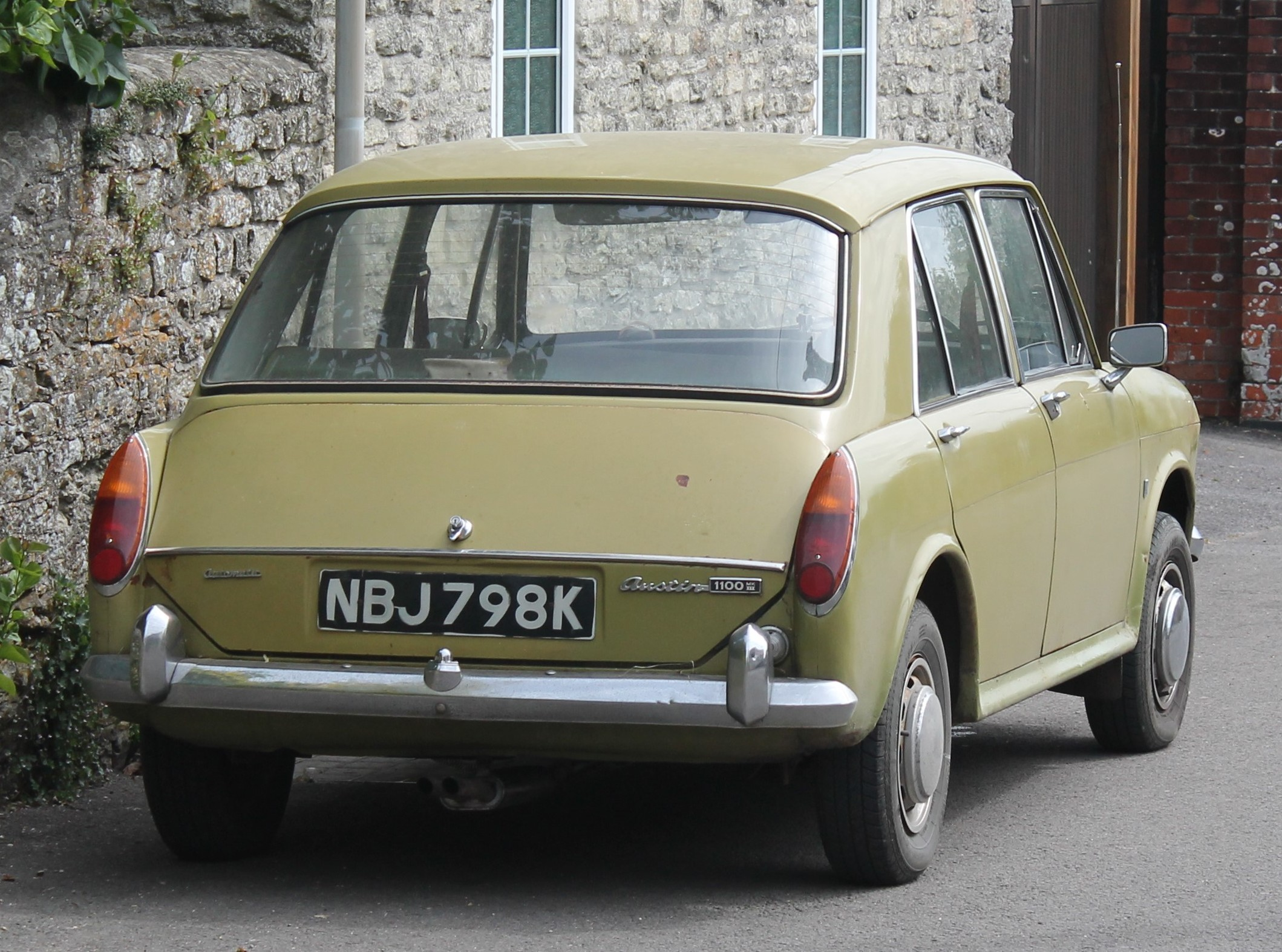
Austin 1100 automatic Mk.III four-door saloon

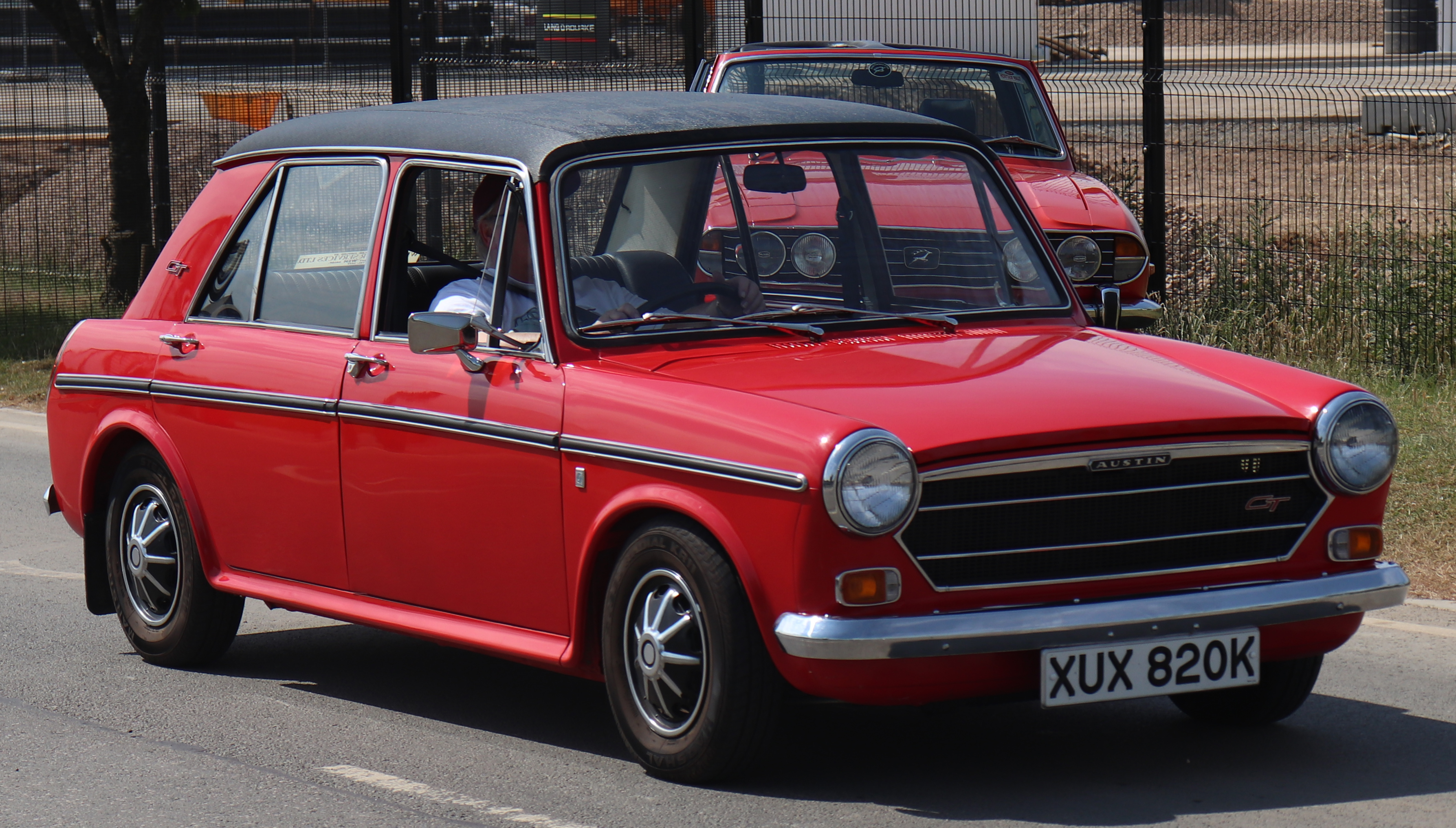
Austin 1300 GT Mk.III four-door saloon

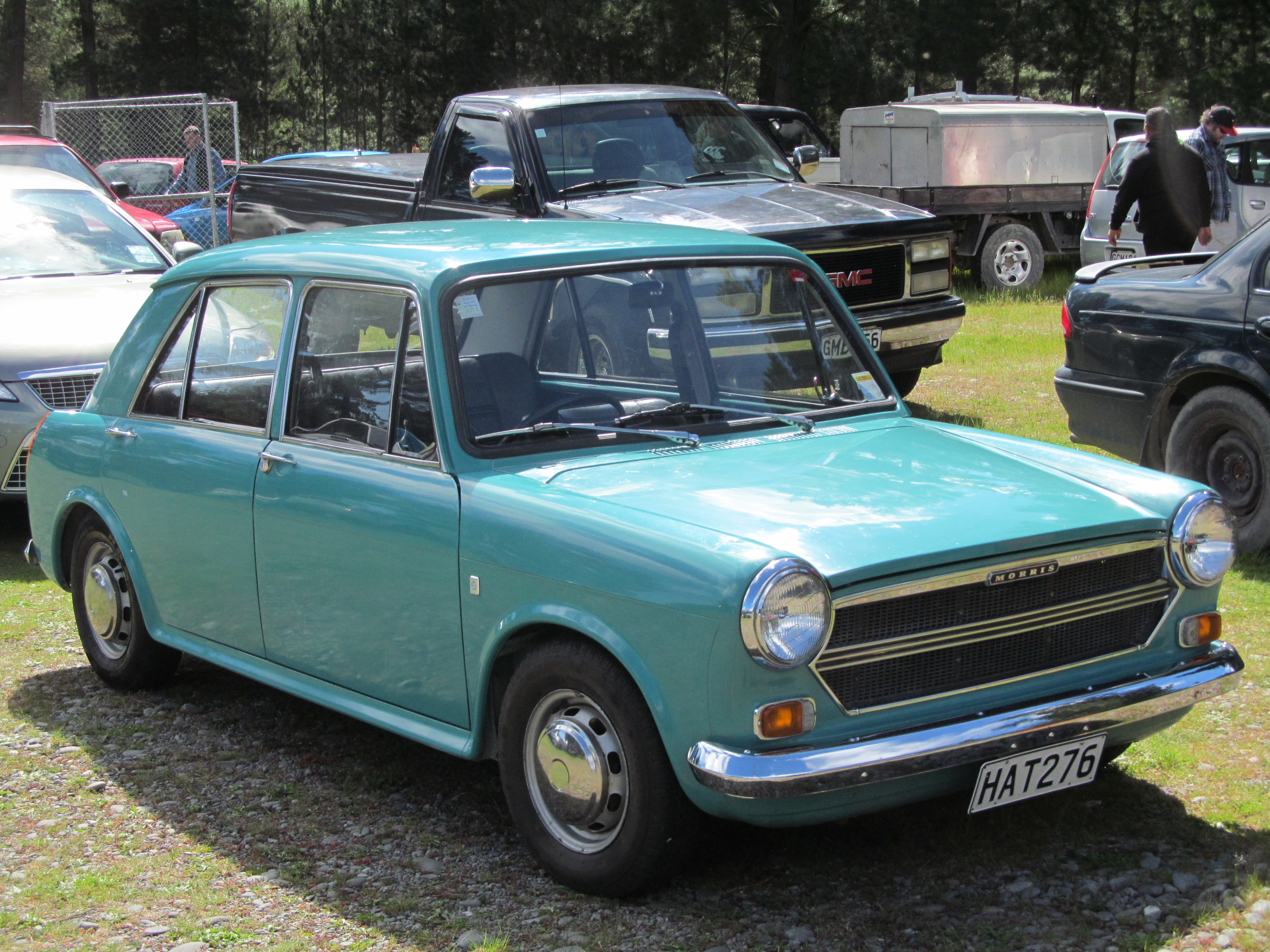
Morris 1100 Mk.III four-door saloon

=== Engine ===
- 1971–1974: 1098 cc A-Series I4
- 1971–1974: 1275 cc A-Series I4

== ADO16 timeline ==
- March 1962 – United Kingdom: The first Morris 1100 and MG 1100 cars were produced at Cowley.
- 15 August 1962 – United Kingdom: Launch of the Morris 1100 four-door saloon in Britain with the two-door saloon for export only. Available in two levels of trim: Standard and Deluxe.
- August 1962 – Denmark: The Morris 1100 four-door saloon is introduced to Denmark where it went on sale as the "Morris Marina" (ADO16). It was initially a slow seller due to a new tax regime that had been introduced in Denmark. Cars were imported by Dansk Oversøisk Motor Industri A/S (DOMI), the Danish Morris agent and given an extensive pre-delivery inspection and side indicators (a local requirement) before shipping out to dealers.
- 2 October 1962 – United Kingdom: Launch of the MG 1100 four-door saloon in Britain. Like the Morris 1100, the two-door saloon was reserved for export only. The MG 1100 had a more powerful 55 bhp (41 kW) twin carburettor version of the A Series engine and a more luxurious interior.
- November 1962 – United Kingdom: Both models now have rear mud flaps.
- January 1963 – Denmark: Sales for the Morris Marina (ADO16) begin to improve.
- February 1963 – New Zealand: CKD Morris 1100 Deluxe four-door sedan assembly starts at Dominion Motors, Newmarket, Auckland.
- April 1963 – USA: MG 1100 launched at the International Auto Show, New York and marketed as the MG Sports Sedan. 1100cc 55 bhp engine, available in two- or four-door saloon versions. Available in showrooms before launch.
- April 1963 – Italy: Introduction of the Innocenti Morris IM3 four-door saloon. This was an ADO16 assembled in Milan, with different front end styling, petrol flap, different bumpers and higher quality interior trim, 1100cc with twin S.U. HS2 carburettors. "IM" was short for "Innocenti-Morris" The '3' as it was the third BMC model adapted and assembled in Italy by Innocenti.
- May 1963 – South Africa: Morris 1100 four-door saloon introduced in Standard and Deluxe trim, identical to UK. Built at Blackheath, Cape Town.
- August 1963 – South Africa: MG 1100 four-door saloon introduced, identical to UK.
- September 1963 – United Kingdom: Introduction of the Austin 1100 four-door saloon, similar to the Morris 1100 but with the traditional eight wavy bar grille with Austin coat of arms on the bonnet and different interior trim and dashboard.
- October 1963 – Denmark: The Austin 1100 four-door saloon introduced to Denmark where it went on sale. Cars were imported by De Forenede Automobilfabrikker A/S (DFA), the Danish Austin agent, and given an extensive pre-delivery inspection and side indicators (a local requirement) before shipping to dealers.
- October 1963 – United Kingdom: Vanden Plas Princess 1100 four-door saloon is presented at the London Motor Show to gauge public reaction. At the same time, all models had the windscreen washer bottle relocated to prevent it from freezing up.
- October 1963 – New Zealand: CBU Austin 1100 Deluxe four-door saloons appear in showrooms. Available early 1964. Initial imports by the Austin Distributors' Federation were assembled in the UK.
- November 1963 – Carpets were replaced by rubber mats.
- 17 February 1964 – Australia: Launch of the Morris 1100 Deluxe four-door sedan. It had a total of thirty-seven different modifications to make it suitable for Australian terrain, including a modified interior for greater comfort. A bench front seat was fitted, with the handbrake moved to a position between the driver's side of the seat and the door. A long, bent gear lever was used to clear the middle of the seat. Externally, over-riders were fitted to both the front and rear bumper bars and, as an optional extra, a solid or metal mesh sun visor could be fitted to the top windscreen arch to help "protect the front seat occupants from eye strain caused by direct sun rays." Another optional extra was a horizontally slatted metal "Venetian Shade" which could be fitted internally to the back window. This was intended to prevent the interior becoming too hot.
- February 1964 – Ireland: CKD Austin 1100 Deluxe four-door saloon assembly starts at Lincoln & Nolan, East Road, East Wall, Dublin.
- May 1964 – South Africa: Austin 1100 four-door saloon introduced in Standard and Deluxe trim, identical to UK-spec cars.
- Spring 1964 – United Kingdom: Vanden Plas Princess 1100 four-door saloon enters production. It was the top of the range model with walnut-veneer dashboard, door cappings, picnic tables in the back of the front seats, Connolly Leather hide upholstery, Wilton carpets and West of England cloth headlining.
- Summer 1964 – United Kingdom: Petrol pump relocated from under body where it was vulnerable to stone damage to partly inside boot.
- September 1964 – Revisions: all models have diaphragm spring clutch, improved heater, crush-style sun visors and plastic-framed rear-view mirror.
- November 1964 – Italy: Introduction of the Innocenti Austin i4 four-door saloon at the Turin Motor Show. The front end styling was very similar to the Morris 1100 sold in the UK. It was fitted with the straight eight bar grille and similar side lamps, but with clear lenses.
- Late 1964/Early 1965 – USA: Launch of the MG Princess four-door saloon. 154 cars were sold. Vanden Plas Princess 1100 badged and marketed as a MG.
- December 1964 – Malta: CKD Morris 1100 Deluxe four-door sedan assembly starts at Car Assembly Ltd, Marsa.
- January 1965 – United Kingdom: Introduction of the Crayford estate conversions of the ADO16.
- March 1965 – United Kingdom: Heater was standardised on Austin/Morris Deluxe model.
- June 1965 – Spain: British Motor Corporation and Nueva Montaña Quijano (NMQ) form 50% partnership in Automoviles de Turismo Hispano Ingleses (Authi).
- August 1965 – USA: MG Sports Sedan two- and four-door versions updated with faux wood Austin style fascia.
- September 1965 – United Kingdom: Introduction of the Wolseley 1100 four-door saloon and Riley Kestrel four-door saloon, both of which were mechanically similar to the MG 1100. The Wolseley had a strip speedometer in a wooden fascia as per the MG, while the Riley Kestrel had three round dials including a rev counter in a wooden fascia. Both were offered with leather seats as standard.
- October 1965 – United Kingdom: Optional four-speed automatic transmission available on the Austin and Morris versions.
- Late 1965 – United Kingdom: Introduction of the Mystique conversion by Creech Motors in Somerset.
- 1965 – Italy: Twin Dell'Orto FZD carburettors introduced on Innocenti Morris IM3, twin S.U. HS2 carburettors are still available, but rare.
- January 1966 – South Africa: Morris 1100 Deluxe receives Austin fascia. Morris 1100 Standard retains original fascia.
- March 1966 – United Kingdom: Morris 1100 Traveller and Austin 1100 Countryman three-door estates launched at the Geneva Motor Show.
- May 1966 – United Kingdom: Reclining front seats become available on all 1100s. When specified on the Traveller and Countryman, the interior could be converted into a double bed.
- May 1966 – Italy: The Innocenti Austin i4S four-door saloon launched. Innocenti Austin i4 with twin carburettors and more trim.
- August 1966 – Italy: The Innocenti IM3S four-door saloon launched. The model lost over-riders and was fitted with a different grille.
- Mid-1966 – United Kingdom: Longbridge had developed a five-door hatchback version of the Australian Morris 1500 known as the Nomad. This model would be launched in Australia in June 1969, but it would never be sold in the UK. Instead, the Austin Maxi would be offered.
- Spring 1966 – Denmark: Morris Marina (ADO16) two-door saloon introduced.
- December 1966 – United Kingdom: British Motor Holdings Limited (BMH) was formed following the British Motor Corporation takeover of both Jaguar Cars and the Pressed Steel Company.
- December 1966 – Spain: Authi Morris 1100 four-door saloon production begins using Austin rather than Morris fascia, available in showrooms from January 1967.
- Early 1967 – Ireland: 264 MG 1100 two-door saloons sent in CKD form. Assembled by Booth Poole & Co. Ltd. Islandbridge, Dublin.
- March 1967 – United Kingdom: 1 Millionth ADO16 produced.
- May 1967 – South Africa: Wolseley 1100 four-door saloon introduced with 50 bhp, single SU HS2, 1098 cc engine. Austin 1100 Countryman and Morris 1100 Traveller three-door estates introduced, identical to UK-spec cars.
- June 1967 – United Kingdom: The 1275 cc engine became an optional extra on the MG, Riley, Vanden Plas and Wolseley versions, in single carburettor 58 bhp (43 kW) form. These models were specifically badged up using the 1275 cc badging. 402 MG 1275 four-door, 162 MG 1275 two-door and 825 Vanden Plas Princess 1275 are reported to have been produced.
- June 1967 – USA: MG Sports Sedan two- and four-door versions fitted with the 1275 cc 58 bhp engine as standard. Austin 1100 two-door saloon launched. The Austin 1100 featured a single large speedometer fitted in the centre of dashboard, similar to that fitted in Deluxe versions of the Morris / Austin 1100 Mark II. Both cars would be replaced by the Austin America in 1968.
- August 1967 – Australia: Launch of the Morris 1100S four-door saloon, with the 1275 cc engine.
- Autumn 1967 – United Kingdom: The Vanden Plas Princess 1275 is replaced after only a few months by the Vanden Plas Princess 1300.
- October 1967 – United Kingdom: Launch of the 1100 Mark II models, with cropped rear fins (saloon models only), ventilated wheels, indicator side repeater lamps fitted to the front wings. A revised interior was also fitted. Austin and Morris versions had revised styling at the front end being fitted with a wider grille. Austin and Morris badges were relocated from the bonnet to the grille. Morris model now fitted with black crackle dashboard similar to the Austin. Rocker switches fitted instead of toggle switches on both models. Estate versions gain a simulated wood effect side trim. Still have Mark I styling at the rear. Introduction of the 1300 models, similar to the 1100 Mark II but with 1275 cc, 58 bhp (43 kW) engine and different front grilles. Morris, Austin and MG 1300 available in two- and four-door, while the Riley, Vanden Plas and Wolseley continued in four-door. MG, Riley, Vanden Plas, Wolseley models were available with automatic transmission. Jensen convertible shown at the London Motor Show. It was based around an Austin 1100 Countryman.

The range of models available in the United Kingdom more than doubled to twenty nine. Models available: Austin two-door: 1100 or 1300, Deluxe or Super Deluxe (4). Austin four-door: 1100 or 1300, Deluxe or Super Deluxe (4). Austin Countryman estate: 1100 or 1300 (Super Deluxe) (2). MG two-door: 1300 (1). MG four-door: 1100 or 1300 (2). Morris two-door: 1100 or 1300, Deluxe or Super Deluxe (4). Morris four-door: 1100 or 1300, Deluxe or Super Deluxe (4). Morris Traveller estate: 1100 or 1300 (Super Deluxe) (2). Riley Kestrel four-door: 1100 or 1300 (2). Wolseley four-door: 1100 or 1300 (2). Vanden Plas Princess four-door: 1100 or 1300 (2).

- October 1967 – USA: Production of MG Sports sedan and Austin 1100 discontinued in the United Kingdom. Available in showrooms until early 1968.
- November 1967 – United Kingdom: A batch of fifty 1100 vans had been produced, but the model never made it into production.
- Late 1967 – Rhodesia: Production of the CKD Morris 1100 at the BMC assembly plant in Umtali is discontinued due to the imposition of mandatory United Nations economic sanctions against the country in 1965 when it declared independence unilaterally in order to maintain white minority rule.
- January 1968 – United Kingdom: British Leyland (BL) takes over British Motor Holdings Limited. British Leyland starts to cull the range, first model to be discontinued is the Riley Kestrel 1100.
- January 1968 – Denmark: Morris Marina (ADO16) 1098 cc, 48 bhp (36 kW) engine, two-door saloon and Morris Marina GT (ADO16) with 1275 cc, 58 bhp (43 kW) engine, two-door and four-door saloon with Mk.II body introduced.
- January 1968 – South Africa: Austin 11/55, Morris 11/55 and Wolseley 11/55 four-door saloons introduced with 54 bhp, single SU HS2, 1098 cc engine, replacing Austin and Morris 1100 Deluxe and Wolseley 1100. Austin 1100 Countryman estate, Morris 1100 Traveller estate, Austin and Morris 1100 Standard, retain 50 bhp 1098 cc engine.
- January 1968 – Spain: Authi MG 1100 four-door saloon launched. Twin carburettor 55 bhp engine, strip speedometer and Innocenti designed interior introduced.
- February 1968 – United Kingdom: Austin/Morris range each reduced from ten to eight models, Models discontinued: 1300 two-door Deluxe, 1300 four-door Deluxe. Wolseley 1100 discontinued.
- March 1968 – United Kingdom: Austin/Morris range each reduced from eight to five models, Models discontinued: 1100 two-door Super Deluxe, 1100 four-door Deluxe, 1100 Estate. Vanden Plas Princess 1100 and MG 1100 four-door models discontinued.
- March 1968 – Spain: Authi Morris 1100 Traveller three-door estate launched.
- April 1968 – United Kingdom: MG 1300 two-door, Riley Kestrel 1300 four-door, Wolseley 1300 four-door with twin SU 65 bhp engine introduced replacing single 56 bhp engine. MG 1300 four-door models discontinued.
- May 1968 – USA: Austin America two-door sedan launched, with 1275 cc 58 bhp Automatic. Manual available only on request.
- June 1968 – United Kingdom: without any formal announcement, a more powerful twin carburettor version of BMC's 1,275 cc engine is fitted to manual gearbox versions of the MG, Riley, Wolseley and Vanden Plas models: automatic transmission versions retained the single carburettor engine.
- July 1968 – New Zealand: Morris 1100 and 1300 four-door saloon with Mk.II body introduced.
- July 1968 – South Africa: MG 1100S four-door saloon with 58 bhp, twin SU HS2, 1098 cc engine replaces MG 1100. Rev counter and oil cooler fitted as standard.
- September 1968 – Spain: Authi Morris 1300 four-door saloon with Mark II body introduced, replacing Authi Morris 1100.
- September 1968 – South Africa: Mark II body introduced to Austin 11/55 and Wolseley 11/55. Austin 1100 Countryman estate, Morris 1100 Traveller estate, Morris 11/55, Austin and Morris 1100 Standard discontinued.
- September 1968 – USA: Austin America (1969 model) updated with minor cosmetic changes.
- October 1968 – United Kingdom: MG 1300 Mk.II and Riley 1300 Mk.II introduced with twin-SU 70 bhp engine replacing the twin-SU 65 bhp engine. The Kestrel name is dropped from the Riley model and it is now named Riley 1300 Mk.II. Wolseley 1300 Mk.II and Vanden Plas Princess 1300 introduced with twin-SU 65 bhp engine. The MG, Riley & Wolseley models are updated with a new interior which includes rocker switches fitted instead of toggle switches and a central armrest in the rear seat. The MG receives the same three dial dashboard as the Riley, while the Wolseley retains the strip speedometer.
- October 1968 – Spain: Authi MG 1300 four-door saloon introduced with twin carburettor 65 bhp engine and Mark II body, replacing Authi MG 1100.
- January 1969 – South Africa: Mark II body introduced to MG1100S.
- February 1969 – Spain: Authi Morris 1300 Traveller three-door estate introduced, replacing Authi Morris 1100 Traveller.
- April 1969 – Spain: 4 gear synchromesh gearbox introduced to Authi range.
- June 1969 – Australia: Morris 1100 production ended, being replaced by the Morris 1300 automatic four-door sedan, Morris 1500 four-door sedan with Mark II body and Morris Nomad five-door hatchback. Approximately 90,000 had been built, all at the BMC Zetland, New South Wales factory. 1300 & 1500 Sedans were coded YDO15 and the Nomad models were designated YDO9.
- July 1969 – United Kingdom: Riley 1300 Mk.II discontinued, along with the Riley name.
- July 1969 – Spain: BL buys 51% stake in NMQ - 76% share in Authi.
- September 1969 – South Africa: Automatic Austin 11/55 & Wolseley 11/55 introduced.
- September 1969 – USA: Austin America (1970 model) updated with rubber faced over-riders, alternator and other improvements.
- September 1969 – Chile: Production by British Leyland Automotores de Chile, S.A. begins of fibre-glass body MG 1300 two-door saloon at Arica, Chile. Available in showrooms late 1970.
- October 1969 – United Kingdom: Austin 1300GT and Morris 1300GT four-door saloons introduced at the London Motor Show. Featuring the same 1275cc twin carburettor 70 bhp engine as installed in the MG 1300 Mk.II. Body as per Austin/Morris saloons but with a black full width grille with twin chrome trim, a black vinyl roof, a thick black metal trim along the swage line and sporty hubcaps. Interior featured black vinyl covered three dial fascia, alloy steering wheel, sportier seats and centre armrest in rear.
- October 1969 – Yugoslavia: CKD Austin 1300 Super Deluxe four-door saloon assembly starts at IMV (Industrija Motornih Vozil), Novo Mesto, now Slovenia.
- December 1969 – South Africa: MG 1100S discontinued.
- July 1970 – Italy: The Innocenti i5 four-door saloon launched, 1098 cc with twin S.U. HS2 Carburettors, replacing Innocenti Morris IM3S, Innocenti Austin i4 & i4S.
- October 1970 – USA: Austin America (1971 model) updated with new GT-style grille and other improvements.
- October 1970 – New Zealand: New Zealand Motor Corporation (NZMC) formed from a merger of five companies: Dominion Motors Ltd, Magnus Motors Ltd, Seabrook Fowlds Ltd, David Crozier Ltd and P.H. Vickery Ltd.
- January 1971 – Spain: Austin 1300 Mk.II four-door saloon introduced, replacing Authi Morris 1300. Austin 1300 Countryman three-door estate introduced, replacing Authi Morris 1300 Traveller estate. Authi and Morris names now dropped.
- April 1971 – Yugoslavia: IMV 1300 Special introduced, based on the Austin 1300 Super Deluxe with twin SU's, metallic paint and cloth upholstery.
- July 1971 – United Kingdom: two-millionth ADO16 produced.
- August 1971 – United Kingdom: Morris 1100 and 1300GT discontinued in the UK, following the launch of the Morris Marina in April 1971. Morris 1300 and Traveller continued.
- September 1971 – United Kingdom: Mark III models are introduced. Morris 1300 and MG 1300 MkII discontinued in the UK. Models available: Austin 1100 two-door Deluxe, 1100 four-door Super Deluxe, 1300 two-door Super Deluxe, 1300 four-door Super Deluxe, 1300GT and 1300 Countryman estate. Morris 1300 Traveller estate, Wolseley 1300 Mk.II and Vanden Plas Princess 1300. Morris 1100 and 1300 branded saloons identical to Austin models and MG 1300 available for export.
- September 1971 – Spain: MG-S 1300 four-door saloon introduced. Updated with the 3 dial fascia as per UK MG 1300 Mk.II, Innocenti designed interior and 65 bhp engine, replacing Authi MG 1300.
- September 1971 – USA: Austin America discontinued, replaced by Austin badged Morris Marina.
- November 1971 – South Africa: Apache four-door saloon styled by Michelotti introduced with 62 bhp, single SU HS4, 1275 cc engine, replacing Austin 11/55 and Wolseley 11/55.
- December 1971 – Australia: Production of the Morris 1300 automatic four-door sedan, Morris 1500 four-door sedan and Morris Nomad five-door hatchback discontinued. Available in showrooms during 1972. Approximately 29,000 had been built. Replaced by Morris Marina. Approximately a total 119,000 ADO16 variants were built in Australia.
- March 1972 – Denmark: Morris Marina (ADO16) two-door saloon and Morris Marina GT (ADO16) two-door and four-door saloon discontinued, replaced by Morris Marina (ADO28).
- April 1972 – Spain: Austin 1100 four-door saloon with Mark III body launched.
- May 1972 – Italy: British Leyland takes over Innocenti and axes the Innocenti i5 soon after. A total 65,808 ADO16 variants were built by Innocenti in Italy.
- September 1972 – New Zealand: Mark III Austin & Morris four-door saloons introduced. Available Super Deluxe 1100, 1300 and 1300 Automatic. Assembled at NZMC, Newmarket, Auckland.
- October 1972 – Spain: Austin Victoria four-door saloon, styling based on the Austin Apache, introduced with two levels of trim, Standard or De Luxe, replacing Austin 1300. Austin 1300 Countryman estate & MG-S 1300 discontinued.
- December 1972 – Yugoslavia: Austin 1300 Super Deluxe four-door saloon production ends at IMV (Industrija Motornih Vozil) as the company switches to Renault vehicles. Available in showrooms until mid-1973. 13,550 CKD Austin 1300 Super Deluxe four-door saloon kits and 485 IMV 1300 special kits were assembled in Novo Mesto, Yugoslavia.
- January 1973 – United Kingdom: Introduction of the rod change gearbox and pot joint inner CV joints.
- April 1973 – United Kingdom: Launch of the Austin Allegro, replacement for the ADO16 models, in the United Kingdom. However, the ADO16 models remain in production alongside the Allegro for the time being. Morris 1300 Traveller estate discontinued, MG 1300 discontinued for export.
- May 1973 – Spain: BL buys 98% share in Authi.
- July 1973 – South Africa: Austin Apache TC four-door saloon introduced with 70 bhp, twin SU HS2, 1275 cc engine. Austin Apache updated with new fascia from MkIII. Rod gearbox.
- August 1973 – United Kingdom: Wolseley 1300 Mk.II discontinued.
- September 1973 – Chile: The Military government comes to power after the coup which overthrew President Allende. In 1974, following the Free Trade plan that deregulated imports, British Leyland closes the Arica plant, but remains an importer until 1984. With the factory closed, the MG 1300 is discontinued. Available in showrooms until late 1974. A total of 3,647 MG 1300's were built in Arica, Chile. Replaced by imported Austin Allegro.
- February 1974 – United Kingdom: Austin 1300 Countryman estate discontinued.
- February 1974 – Spain: Austin De Luxe four-door saloon introduced with 54 bhp 998 cc engine, replacing Austin 1100.
- June 1974 – United Kingdom: Production of the remaining ADO16 models in the United Kingdom is discontinued.
- October 1974 – Spain: A destructive fire at the factory results in BL deciding to close it. Negotiations with GM to buy the factory had fallen through earlier in the year.
- May 1975 – Spain: Production ends for Austin Victoria and Austin De Luxe. A total 95,355 ADO16 variants were built by Authi in Spain.
- November 1975 – New Zealand: Austin & Morris Mk.III models discontinued, replaced by Austin Allegro. A total 42,357 CKD kits were assembled in New Zealand at Newmarket, Auckland (Dominion Motors, NZMC) and Petone, Wellington (Associated Motor Industries a company owned by the Austin Distributors' Federation).
- May 1976 – South Africa: Austin Apache 35 Automatic limited edition four-door saloon introduced. Limited to 300 units.
- April 1977 – South Africa: Austin Apache Automatic discontinued.
- 1977 – South Africa: Production of the Austin Apache and Austin Apache TC discontinued. Available in showrooms until 1978. A total 55,409 ADO16 variants were built in South Africa, signalling the end of all AD016 derived products after 15 years.

== Gallery ==
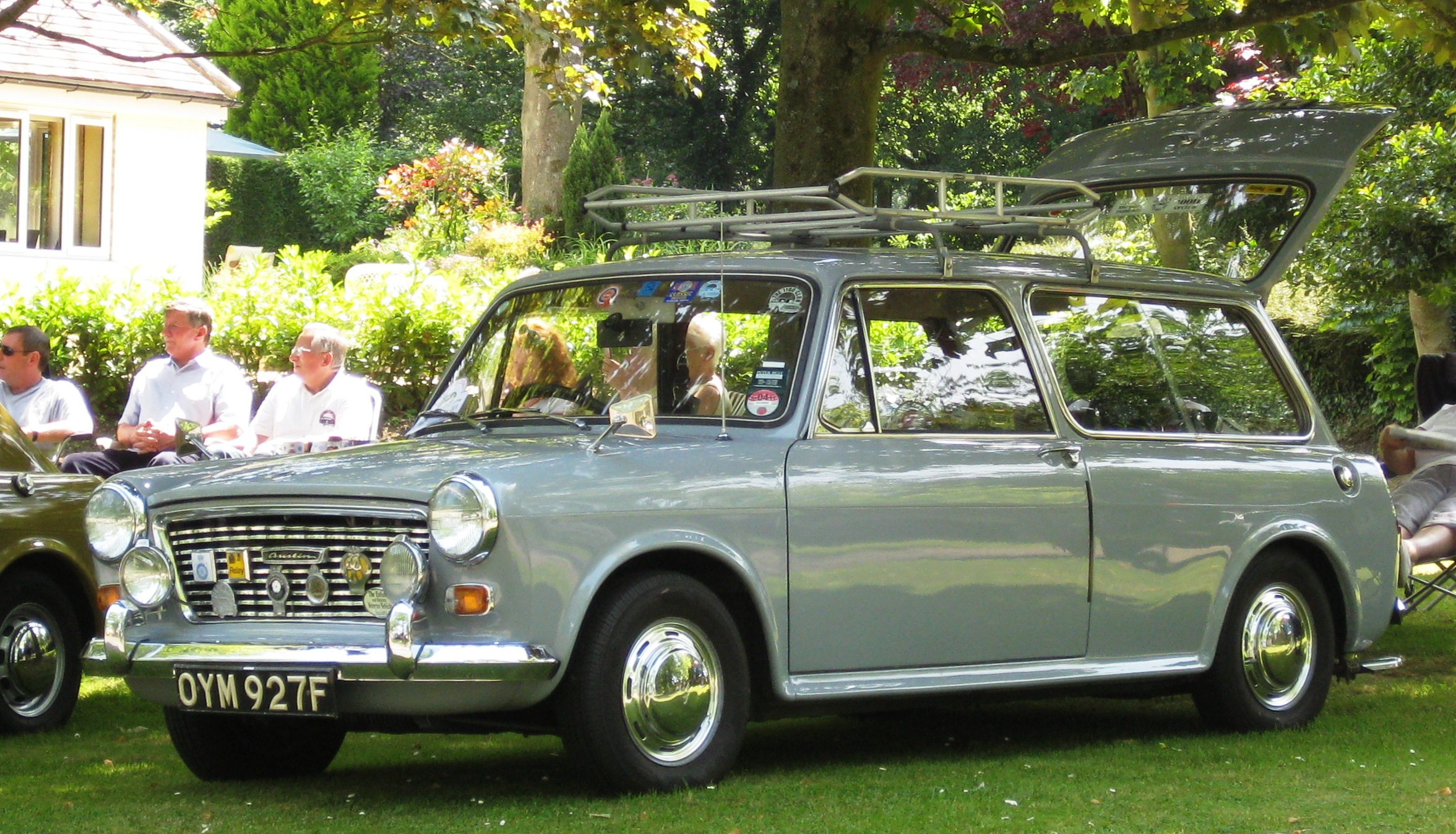
Austin 1100 Mk.I Countryman (three-door estate ) 1967. A red 1100 Countryman was immortalised in the Fawlty Towers episode "Gourmet Night"

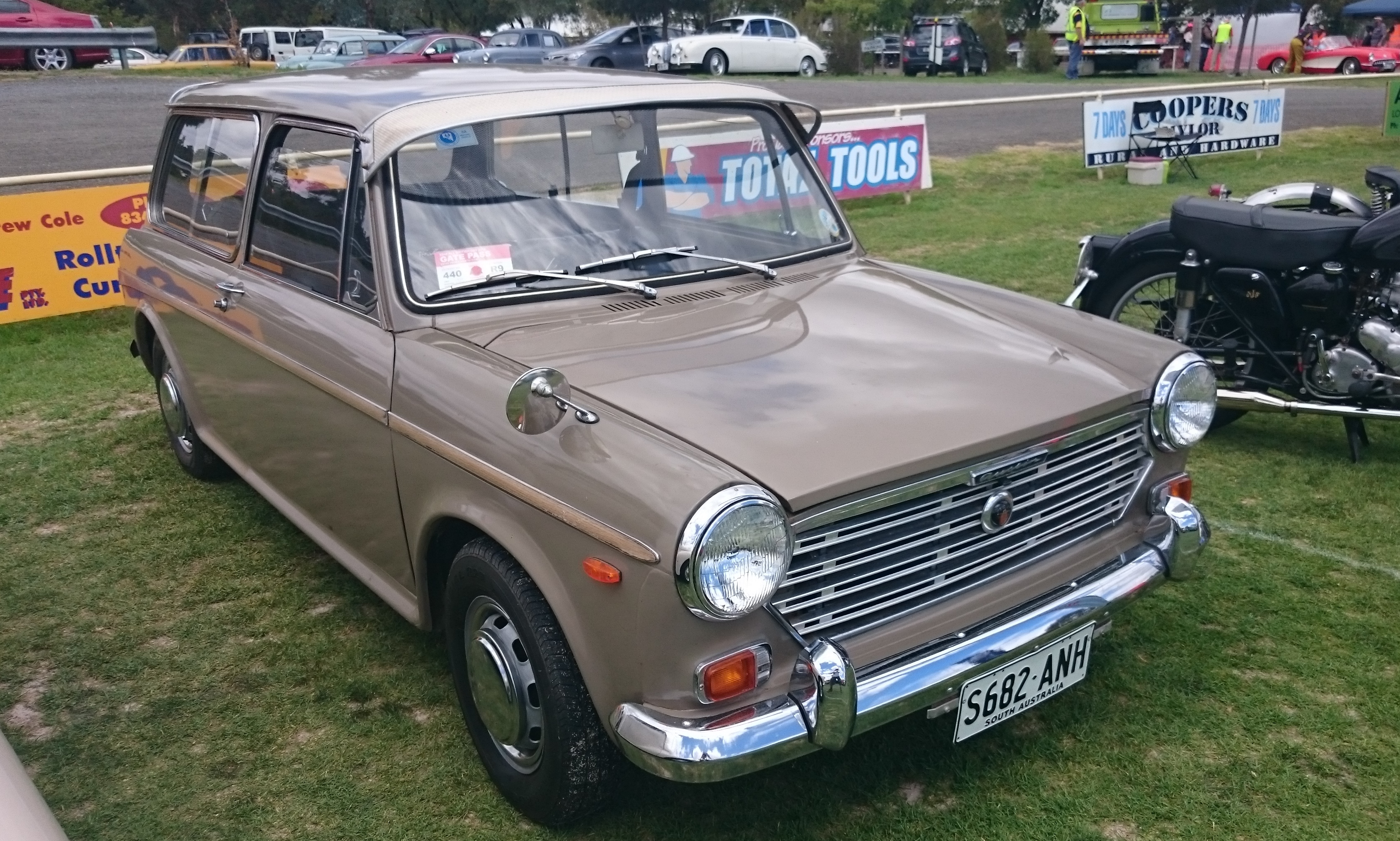
1970 Austin 1300 Countryman three-door estate

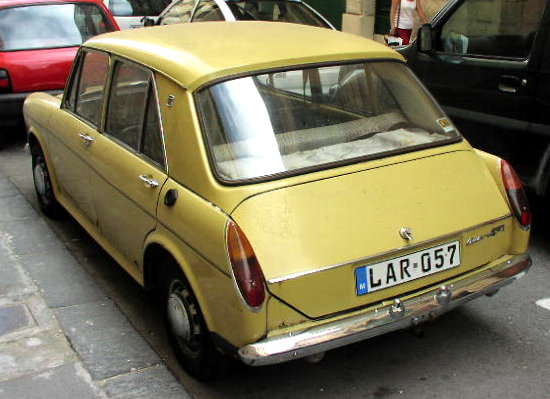
Rear view of a Maltese-assembled Austin 1100 Mk.III four-door saloon

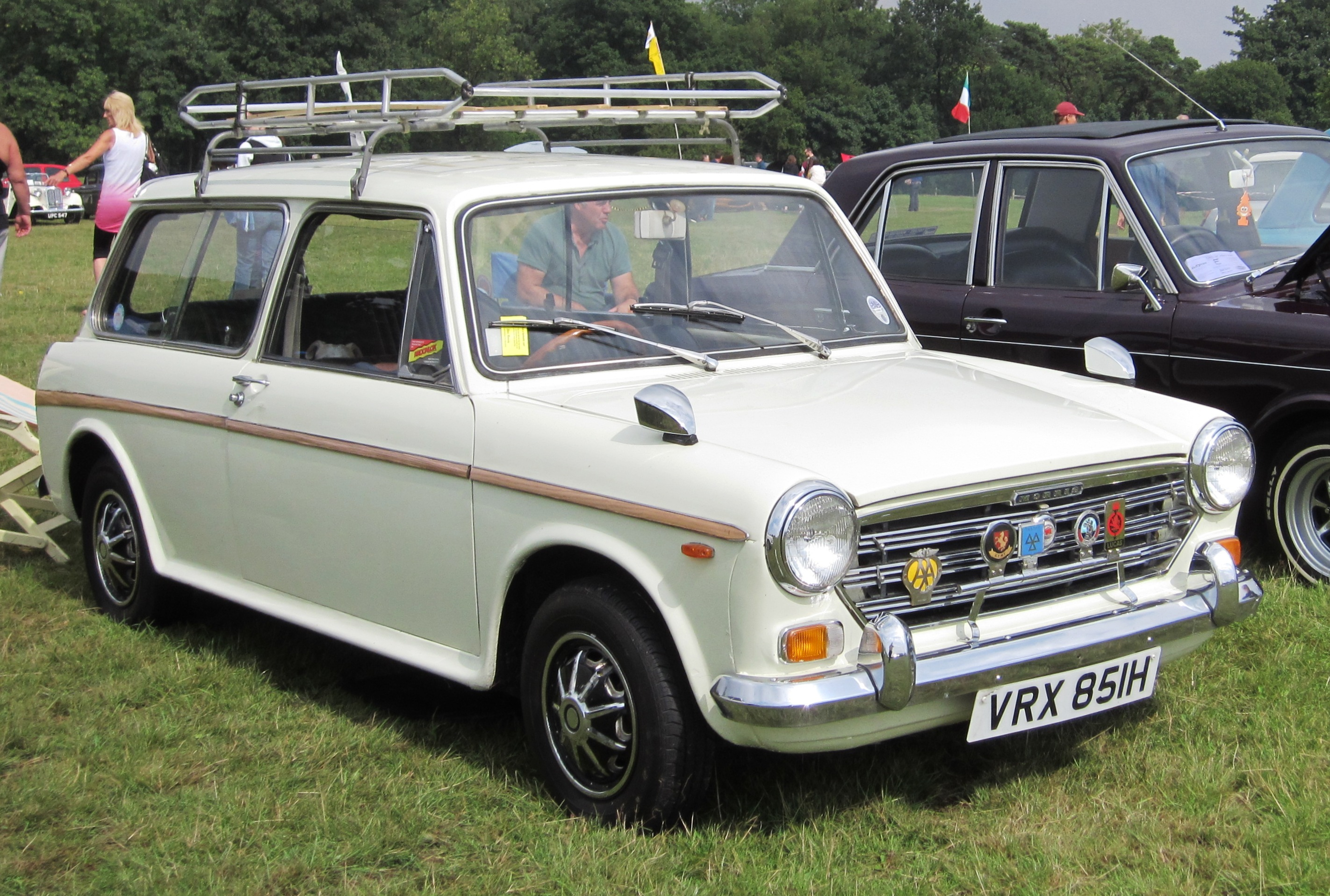
Morris 1300 Mk.II Traveller (three-door estate ) 1969

== Legacy ==
As of February 2016 according to DVLA data there were 640 examples that were taxed and on UK roads.

During the Worboys Committee in the 1960s when the British road signage system was being redesigned, the silhouette of the ADO16 (since it was the UK's best selling car of the time) was used in many of the new road sign designs which are all still in use.

== ADO16 overseas ==
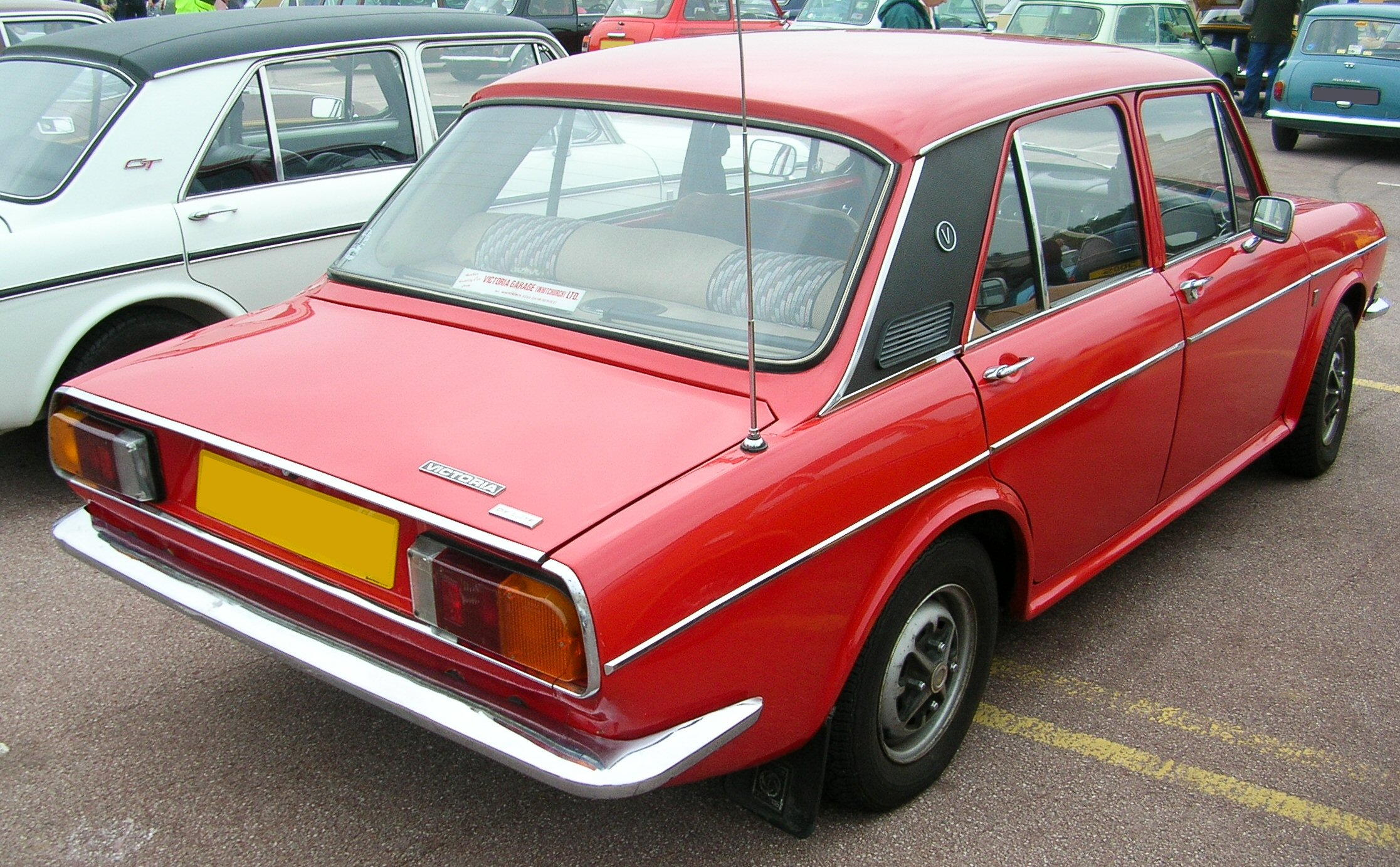
The Austin Victoria was a Pamplona assembled ADO16, introduced in 1972 with a restyled front end and a lengthened rear luggage compartment.

The car was sold with various names in different markets.

In Spain it was sold as Morris, Austin and MG, starting production in the Pamplona Authi (Automóviles de Turismo Hispano Ingleses) factory in 1966, and evolving by 1972 into the Austin Victoria.

In Denmark the ADO16 bore the Morris Marina name from 1962 to 1972 - the same name as the British-built and better-known range of saloons produced in the British Leyland range from 1971 to 1980. The MG models were sold as the MG Sports Sedan there, as it was in North America from 1962, and was available with a two-door bodyshell that was unavailable in the UK until 1968. The Vanden Plas Princess was briefly the MG Princess 1100 in North America, while that market also saw an unusual two-door Austin 1100 (with a hybrid of Mark I and Mark II components). The ADO16 was not a strong seller in the Northern American markets - particularly in the USA where it was by far one of the smallest cars on sale. In the Netherlands the Austin version was sold as the Austin Glider.

The Austin America was sold in the US, Canada and Switzerland between 1968 and 1972. This two-door version of the car featured a 60 bhp (45 kW) 1275 cc engine. Various modifications were made to suit the US market including an "anti-pollution air injection system", a split circuit braking system, rocker switches in place of some of the dashboard mounted knobs, a "hazard warning system" and flush door locks.

The ADO16 also formed the basis of the Australian Morris 1500 sedan (coded YDO15), Morris 1300 sedan (YDO15) and Morris Nomad five-door (YDO9), the Italian Innocenti Morris IM3 and Austin I4 and I5, the more powerful South African Austin, Morris and Wolseley 11/55 and Austin Apache and the Spanish Austin Victoria and the Austin de Luxe of 1974 to 1977, which had a 998 cc engine.

The Austin Apache was produced until 1977, the last of the ADO16 line, ending a production run of 15 years.

== BMC 1100 Aerodinamica ==
In 1967 Pininfarina unveiled at the Turin Motor Show a concept car based on the BMC 1800 called the BMC 1800 Aerodinamica. The sleek design predated the Citroen CX by some seven years. The car was evaluated by BMC, and Pininfarina developed a further smaller model based on the BMC ADO16 model, but the design was not taken up by the then merged British Leyland. This was after BMC had investigated a Mini shaped version. The 1800 version was however used by chief engineer Harry Webster and was known within the Austin Morris division as the Yellow Peril.
