= Morris Nomad =

Australian car

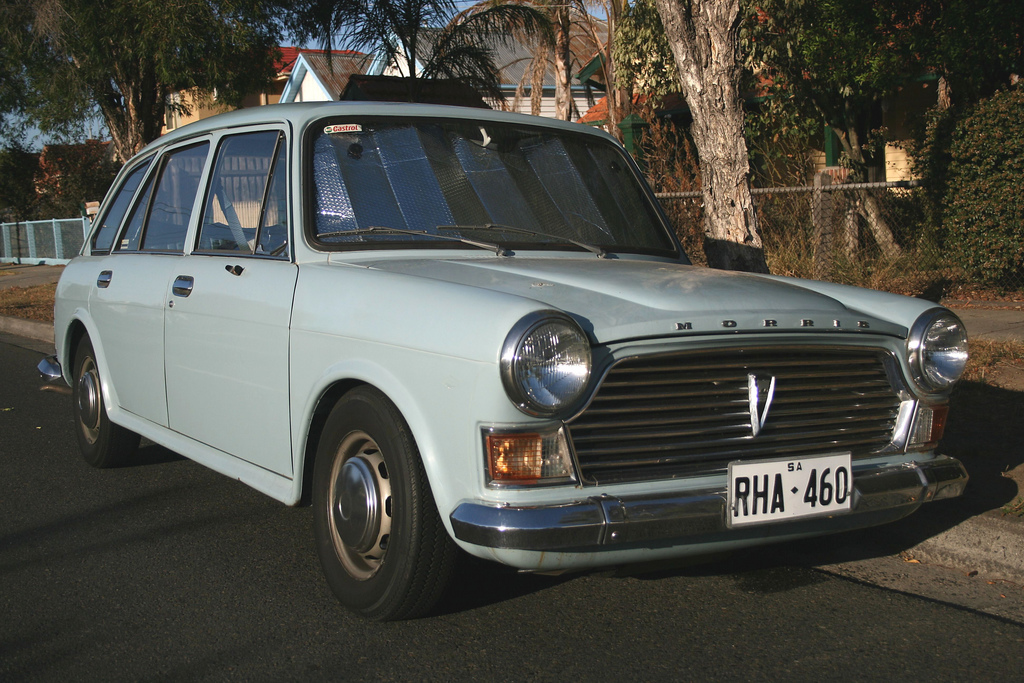

Overview
- Manufacturer: Leyland Australia
- Also called: Austin Nomad (New Zealand); Austin 1300; Austin 1500
- Production: 1969–1972; 29,000 produced
- Assembly: Australia: Zetland, New South Wales

Body and chassis
- Class: Mid-size car
- Body style: 5-door hatchback
- Layout: FF layout
- Related: Morris 1500

Powertrain
- Engine: 1,485 cc (90.6 cu in) E-series; 1,275 cc (77.8 cu in) A-series (for automatic versions)
- Transmission: 4 or 5-speed manual 4-speed AP automatic

Dimensions
- Wheelbase: 93.5 in (2,375 mm)
- Length: 147.66 in (3,751 mm)
- Width: 60.375 in (1,534 mm)
- Height: 53 in (1,346 mm)
- Curb weight: 2,094 lb (950 kg) approx

Chronology
- Successor: Morris Marina

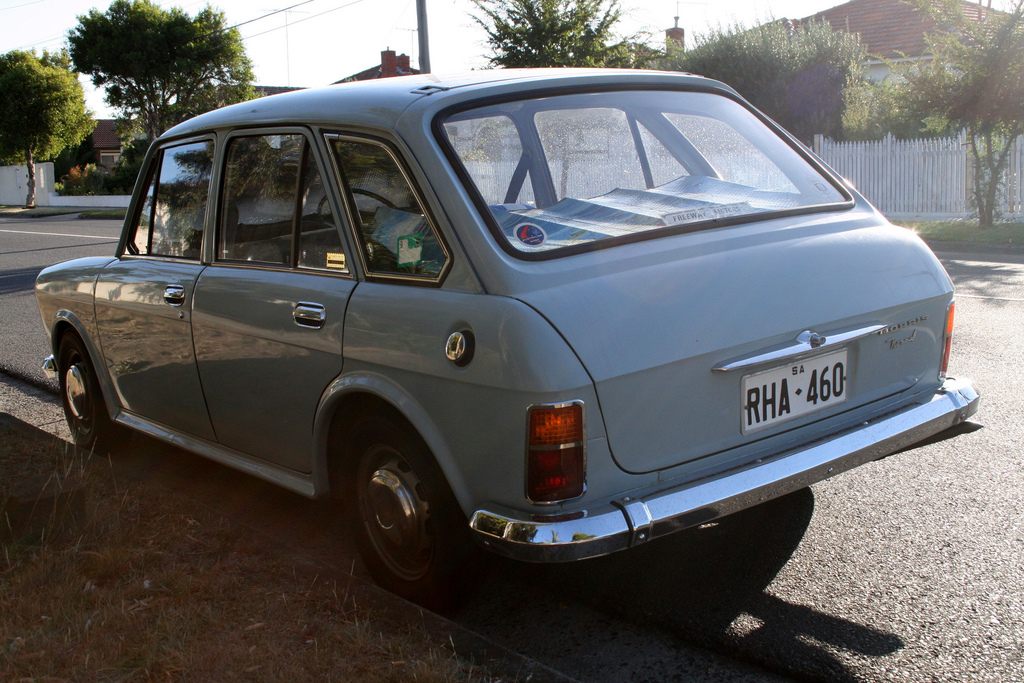
Rear view of the Morris Nomad

The Morris Nomad is a car that was produced in Australia by British Leyland Motor Corporation of Australia from 1969 to 1972. It is a hatchback version of the Morris 1500 sedan, itself a locally produced variant of the British BMC ADO16 design with a larger 1500 cc engine.

The Nomad was a small - medium-sized car, sitting above the Morris Mini in size and price. The hatchback styling resembles that of the Austin Maxi, which was never sold in Australia.

It was a front-wheel-drive car, with an all independent suspension linked by fluid filled chambers, which was called Hydrolastic suspension by the company. The suspension gave a comfortable ride, only suffering a little from "droop" if overloaded in the boot, and sometimes going into oversteer if the body rolled too much with hard cornering.

Power came from a BMC E-Series engine with a single overhead camshaft, which provided improved performance and economy compared with the original Morris 1100 model. Four- and five-speed manual gearboxes were available. Automatic versions of the 1500 sedan and Nomad were fitted with the 1275cc BMC A-Series engine and Automotive Products 4-speed automatic transmission also used in the Mini.Matic models and marketed as a Morris 1300 Automatic.

The body was largely identical, except with new pressings for the front and rear panels to fit with the British Leyland "corporate look", and to shed the tailfins of the original model. There was also a new bonnet pressing incorporating a bulge to allow clearance for the taller E Series 1500cc engine.

Unlike their British counterparts which were coded ADO16, the Nomads were designated with a YDO9 code and the sedans with YDO15.

Austin Nomad, Austin 1500 and Austin 1300 names were used in some export markets, where the cars were marketed by Austin.

The Morris 1300/1500/Nomad models were replaced in the Australian market in 1972 by the Morris Marina.

Approximately 29,000 were built.
