= Austin Apache =

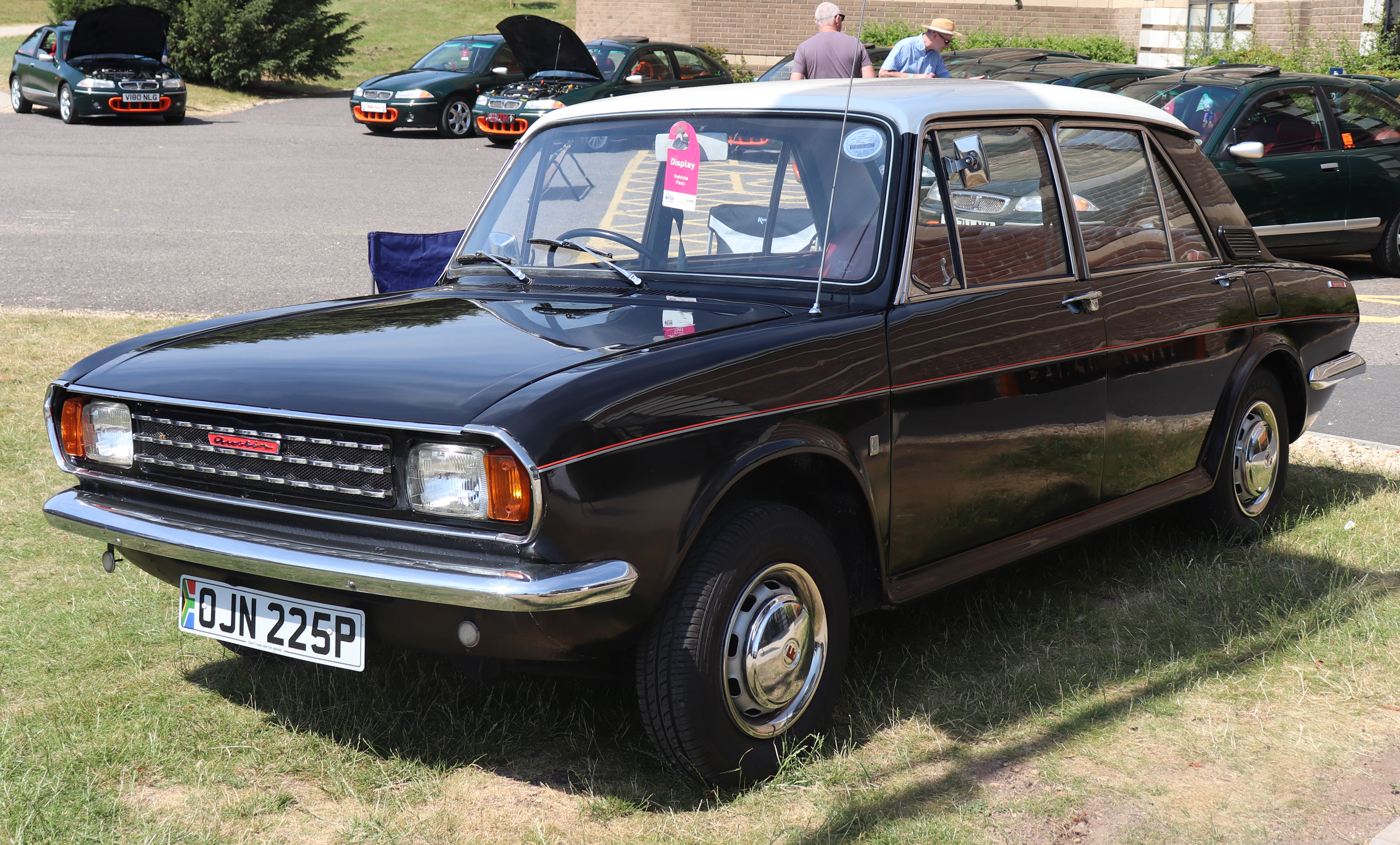
- 1976 Austin Apache

Overview
- Manufacturer: Leykor (British Leyland); Authi
- Also called: Austin Victoria (Spain)
- Production: 1971–1978 (Apache) 1972–1975 (Victoria)
- Assembly: South Africa: Cape Town (Leykor); Spain: Pamplona (Authi)
- Designer: Giovanni Michelotti; Alec Issigonis

Body and chassis
- Class: Compact
- Body style: 4-door saloon
- Layout: Front-engine, front-wheel-drive
- Related: BMC ADO16

Powertrain
- Engine: 1,275 cc A-series I4

Dimensions
- Wheelbase: 2,370 mm (93 in)
- Length: 4,030 mm (159 in)
- Width: 1,530 mm (60 in)

The Austin Apache is a small family car that was produced by Leykor between November 1971 and 1978. The Apache was the last BMC ADO16 car to be produced. The Spanish manufacturer Authi also built a version of the car, called the Austin Victoria, at its Pamplona plant between 1972 and 1975.

== History ==
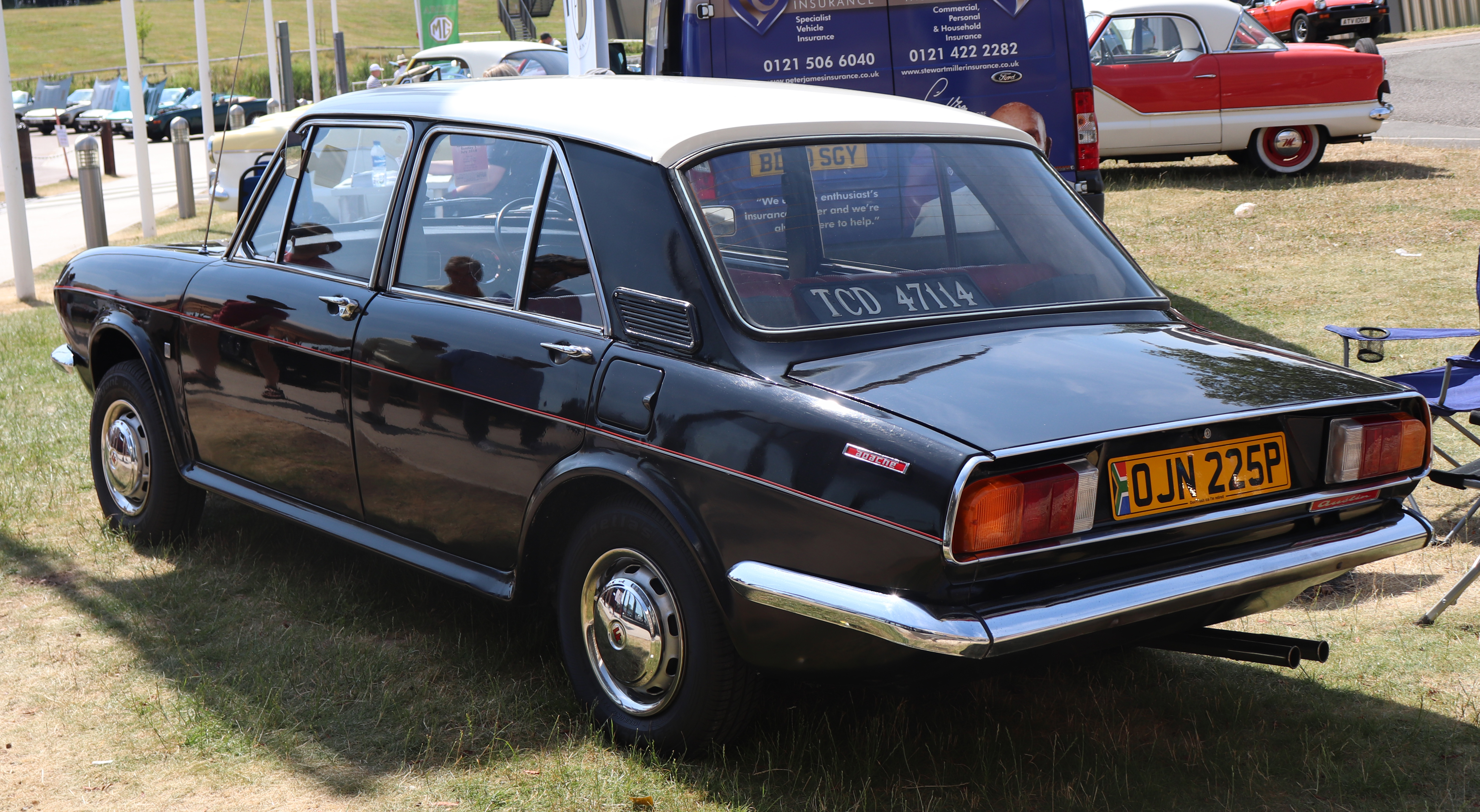
1976 Austin Apache 1.3

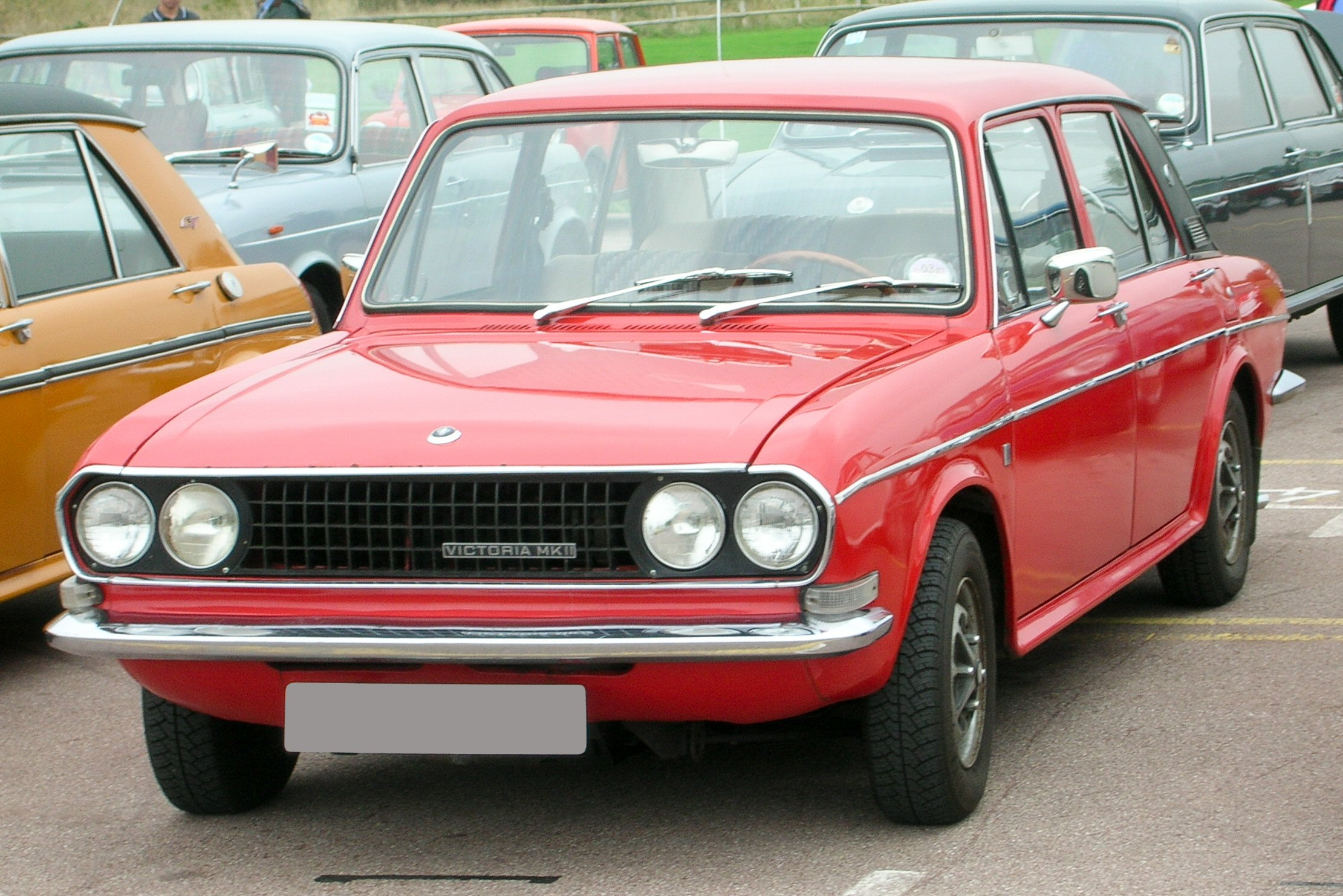

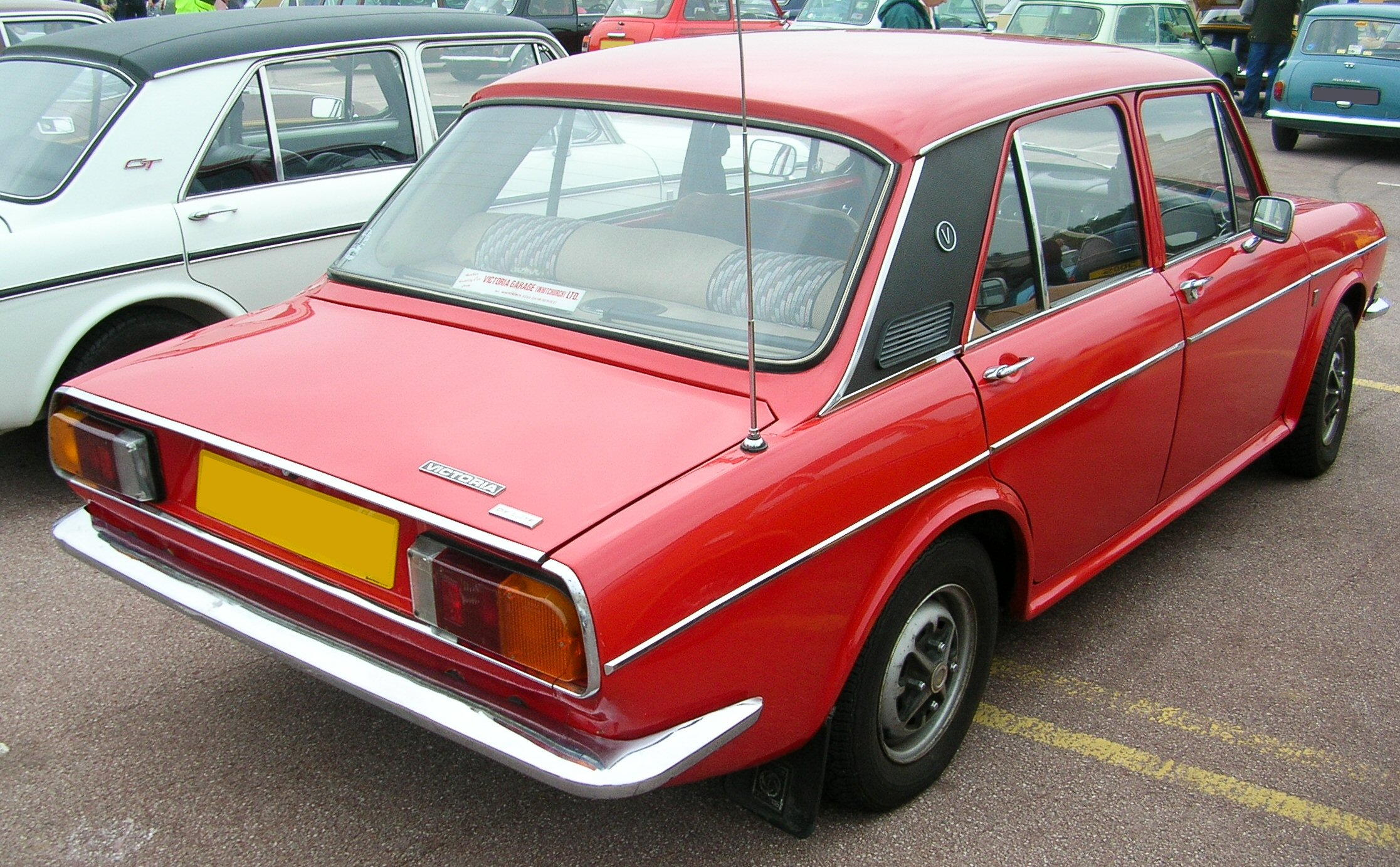
1973 Austin Victoria MKII De Luxe

The car was styled by Michelotti, and based on the chassis and various other components of the Austin/Morris 1100. Leykor executives saw Michelotti's prototype in England and chose it for production in South Africa, where ADO16 sales had been dropping. While the car's centre structure was that of the Austin/Morris 1100, its front and rear styling was all-new, styled (particularly at the rear, where the boot was a notchback) to resemble a scaled-down Triumph 2000/2500. The tail lights, and outer sections of the rear bumper were the same as those used by the Triumph 2000/2500. See also the more comparably sized Triumph Dolomite and Triumph Toledo.

In 1973 the Apache received a minor facelift, introducing proper CV joints, round Smiths gauges and a rod linkage for the gear shift. Originally, the ADO16 used rubber drive joints, a strip speedometer, and a remote extension gear lever. Also in 1973, the sporty TC model was added to the lineup. Power was up to 75 PS (55 kW) at 5,800 rpm, compared to 63 PS (46.2 kW) at 5,250 rpm for the 'cooking' versions. The TC also received Rostyle rims, vinyl roof, a rev counter, and a sporty steering wheel. All versions of the Apache and Victoria used the 1,275 cc version of BMC's venerable A-series four-cylinder, with a variety of outputs.

== Production ==
South African sales
| Version | Apache | Apache TC | Totals |
| 1971 | 455 | — | 455 |
| 1972 | 3,908 | — | 3,908 |
| 1973 | 4,607 | 649 | 5,256 |
| 1974 | 3,725 | 857 | 4,582 |
| 1975 | 3,356 | 675 | 4,031 |
| 1976 | 1,830 | 517 | 2,347 |
| 1977 | 749 | 236 | 985 |
| 1978 | 49 | 42 | 91 |
| Totals' | 18,679 | 2,976 | 21,655 |
