= Parmentier =

Parmentier can refer to:

== People ==
- André Parmentier (landscape architect) (1780–1830), American landscape architect
- André Parmentier (sport shooter) (1876–1969), French sport shooter
- Antoine-Augustin Parmentier (1737–1813), French scientist, promoter of the use of potatoes as a food
- Armand Parmentier (born 1954), Belgian long-distance runner
- Henri Parmentier, French archeologist
- Herman Parmentier (born 1945), Belgian long-distance runner
- Jean Parmentier (diplomat) (1883–1936)
- Jean Parmentier (explorer) (1494–1529), French navigator, cartographer, and poet
- Julie-Marie Parmentier (born 1981), French actress
- Koene Dirk Parmentier, KLM airplane pilot in the 1948 KLM Constellation air disaster
- Marc Parmentier (born 1956), Belgian scientist
- Pauline Parmentier (born 1986), French tennis player
- Philippe Parmentier (1787–1867), Belgian sculptor

== Other uses ==
- Parmentier (Paris Metro), station on the Paris Metro
- Parmentier (band), a short-lived music band in New Zealand
- Hachis Parmentier, a French dish based on mashed potato
- Parmentier (Dune), a fictional planet from the Dune universe
