= AP automatic transmission =

Motor vehicle component

AP Automatic Transmission

Overview
- Manufacturer: Automotive Products for British Motor Corporation
- Production: 1965-2000

Body and chassis
- Class: 4-speed transverse automatic transmission

The AP automatic transmission is a 4-speed automatic transmission unit developed by Automotive Products and the British Motor Corporation specifically for use in the Mini.

It was unique in that not only was it one of the first transverse-mounted automatic transmission units tailored for front wheel drive, it was also one of the smallest in order to be used in the transmission-in-sump installation beneath the A-series engine used in the Mini and later the 1100/1300 ranges. Another novel feature was that the transmission was designed to use the engine's lubricating oil rather than conventional automatic transmission fluid (ATF). The units were manufactured in a BMC plant in Kings Norton, Birmingham which supplied complete powertrain packages (the unit required a unique engine variant) to the Longbridge and Cowley assembly plants.

Around the early 70s, the transmission received revisions with the new pre-oiler pump that prevented the 3-4 engine surge between shifts and the quiet engagement into drive and reverse thanks to a revision valve that held the gears until it was fully engaged, eliminating a hard clunk heard on earlier versions of the transmission.

It was also later used on the Austin Allegro and also in the original A-Series engine version of the Austin Metro, which remained in production until 1991 (outlasting the manual transmission version, which ceased production the year before in favour of the heavily revised Rover Metro).

It also remained an option on the Japanese Domestic Market Mini until the demise of Rover Japan in 2000.

== Known Issues ==
- Because the unit uses engine oil for both lubrication and for powering its hydraulic circuit, engine oil changes are critical to the long-term reliability of the transmission. Typically it should be changed every 6000 miles.
- The transmission is not interchangeable with a conventional BMC sump-mounted manual gearbox without quite a lot of expensive machining work because of the different oil pump position (it is set forward in the block than a manual as the pump and is about 3 times bigger); also, it doesn't use the manual variant oil filter which on the automatic is blocked off, and a different filter unit is fitted to the transmission front case. On the 1996 variant, the oil pipework takes a different route and goes through the block instead of the external pipe; this makes it difficult should you require to fit an oil cooler. The AP automatic requires to be fitted to its own unique version of the A-series engine. This causes issues for Mini owners wanting to convert to a manual gearbox, since the entire engine has to be changed also. It is also worthwhile noting that the automatic subframe is not compatible with the manual gearbox, and it is better to change the whole lot.
- Due to the design of the transmission, the main forward clutch had to take the engine torque AFTER multiplication through the gearbox. As a result, forward clutch failure was common; however, there are a couple of companies: KM Precision Engineering Ltd and AP2. world that can modify your forward clutch pack so that it can take 150% more torque.

The best oil to use is a JASO spec MA2 oil used by motorcycles that a) share the oil with the engine, b) have wet clutch plates/packs, and c) have a far greater performance than lower-performance motorcycles.

Few companies are able to remanufacture these units, and they are getting increasingly scarce over time.

The gear sets can fail if overloaded; this tends to happen after the unit has suffered a serious amount of wear or damage that causes the transmission to engage "come in" with a thud. This can cause the double bevel gears (an especially interesting part to engineers) to break at the weld between each pair of laser-welded gears.

== Applications ==
- Mini mk2 - mk7(1965–2000)
- BMC ADO16 (1968–73)
- Morris Nomad (1969–1972)
- Austin Allegro (1973–82)
- Austin Metro (1980–1990)
