= Jean Parmentier =

Jean Parmentier may refer to:

- Jean Parmentier (diplomat) (1883–1936)
- Jean Parmentier (explorer) (1494–1529)
