= Philippe Parmentier =

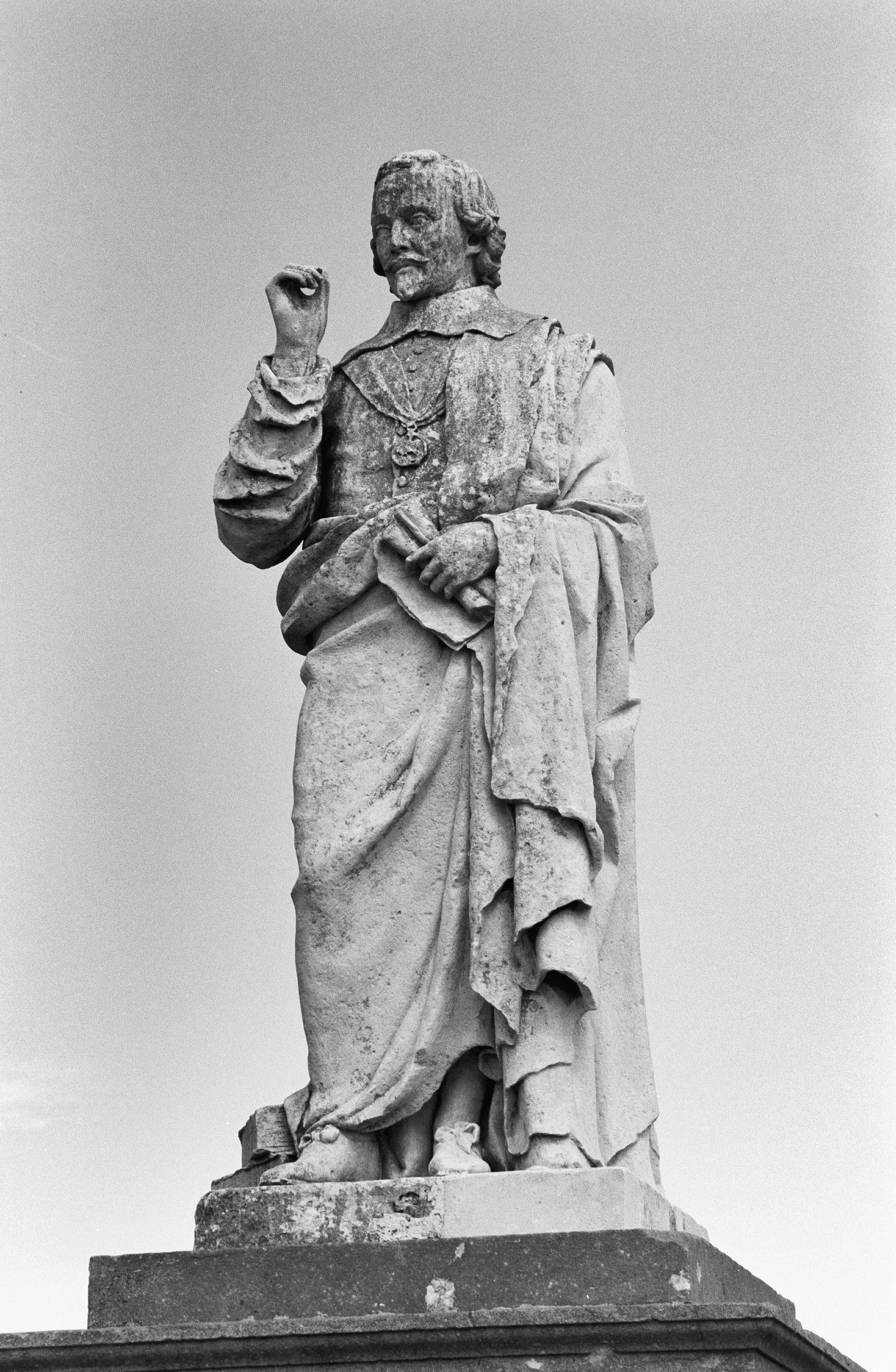
Statue of Jacob Cats, Brouwershaven, Netherlands (1829)

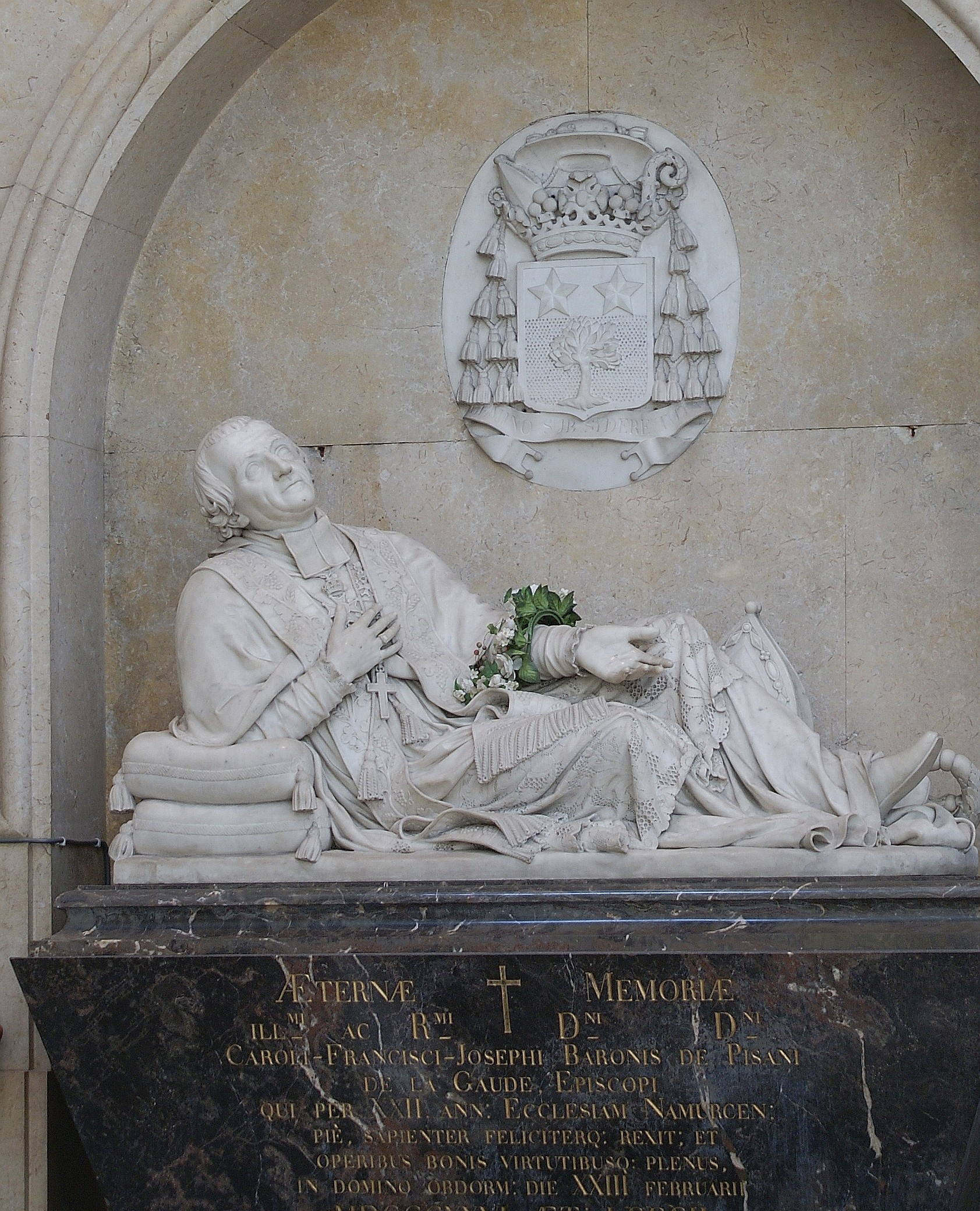
Funerary monument of Charles Pisani de la Gaude, Namur (1826)

Philippe Joseph Parmentier (6 February 1784 (Note: According to RKD he was born on 15 November 1787, according to the municipality of Seneffe he was born on 6 February 1784.) – 5 May 1867) was a Belgian sculptor.

== Life and work ==
Philippe Joseph Parmentier was born in Feluy in 1784. He was a son of the sculptor Antoine François Parmentier and Marie Madeleine Remiens. He received his first training from his father and studied at the École des Beaux-Arts in Paris, where he was a student of, among others, François Joseph Bosio. Parmentier exhibited several times, including at the Brussels and Ghent Salon and the Exhibition of Living Masters in Amsterdam (1824) and Haarlem (1825). In 1836 he was appointed professor at the Royal Academy of Fine Arts in Ghent, a position he held until 1850.
