= Feluy =

Feluy Felû (Walloon)
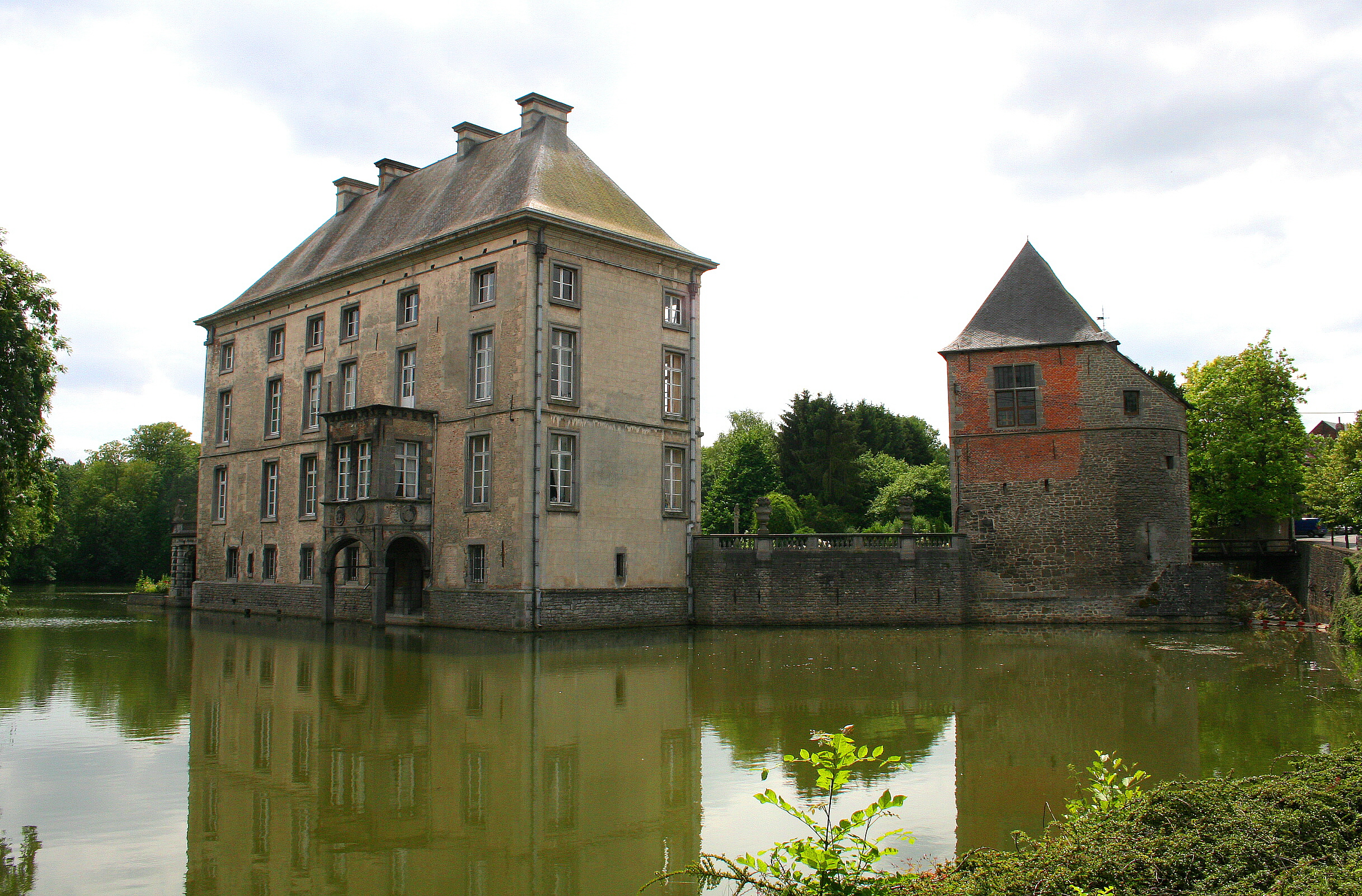
- Château de Feluy

- Location within Belgium Location within Europe
- Coordinates: 50°33′N 04°15′E
- Country: Belgium
- Region: Wallonia
- Province: Hainaut
- Municipality: Seneffe

Feluy (Walloon: Felû) is a village of Wallonia and a district of the municipality of Seneffe, located in the province of Hainaut, Belgium.

The first mention of the village is from 673, but the settlement probably dates back to the time of the Gauls. Stone quarries have operated in the village since the 14th century. The village church dates largely from 1754 to 1756 but incorporates details from an earlier church building. The Château de Feluy lies in the centre of the village; its oldest parts date from the 15th century and contains the coats of arms of the Renesse–Rubempré–Egmont families. The Château de la Rocq lies in the vicinity of the village proper.

== People from Feluy ==
- Philippe Parmentier (sculptor, 1787–1867)
- Victor Rousseau (sculptor, 1865–1954)
- Philippe Busquin (politician, born 1941)
