= Arquennes =

Arquennes Årkene (Walloon)
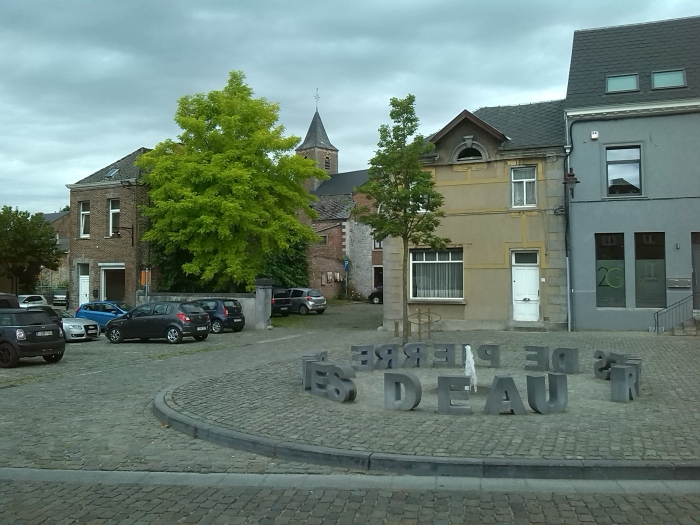
- Arquennes

- Location within Belgium Location within Europe
- Coordinates: 50°34′N 04°16′E
- Country: Belgium
- Region: Wallonia
- Province: Hainaut
- Municipality: Seneffe

Arquennes (French pronunciation: [aʁkɛn]; Walloon: Årkene) is a village of Wallonia and a district of the municipality of Seneffe, located in the province of Hainaut, Belgium.

The area has been inhabited since prehistoric times. In 1137, the name appears as Arkenna. During the Middle Ages, there was a castle in the village but it has since been destroyed. Until 1800, the village was part of the Province of Brabant but has since been a part of Hainaut Province. The village has suffered damage several times during the many wars that have ravaged the area throughout history. The village church has a nave and chancel from the 16th century, in a Hainaut Gothic style. The tower dates from 1762 to 1764.
