= Automotive Products =

British automotive components company

- Type: Private company
- Industry: Automotive industry
- Founded: 1920
- Defunct: 2000
- Fate: Broken up, automotive side sold to Delphi Automotive Systems
- Successor: Shiftec (Leamington Spa)
- Headquarters: Leamington Spa, England, United Kingdom
- Area served: Worldwide
- Products: Brake and clutch components

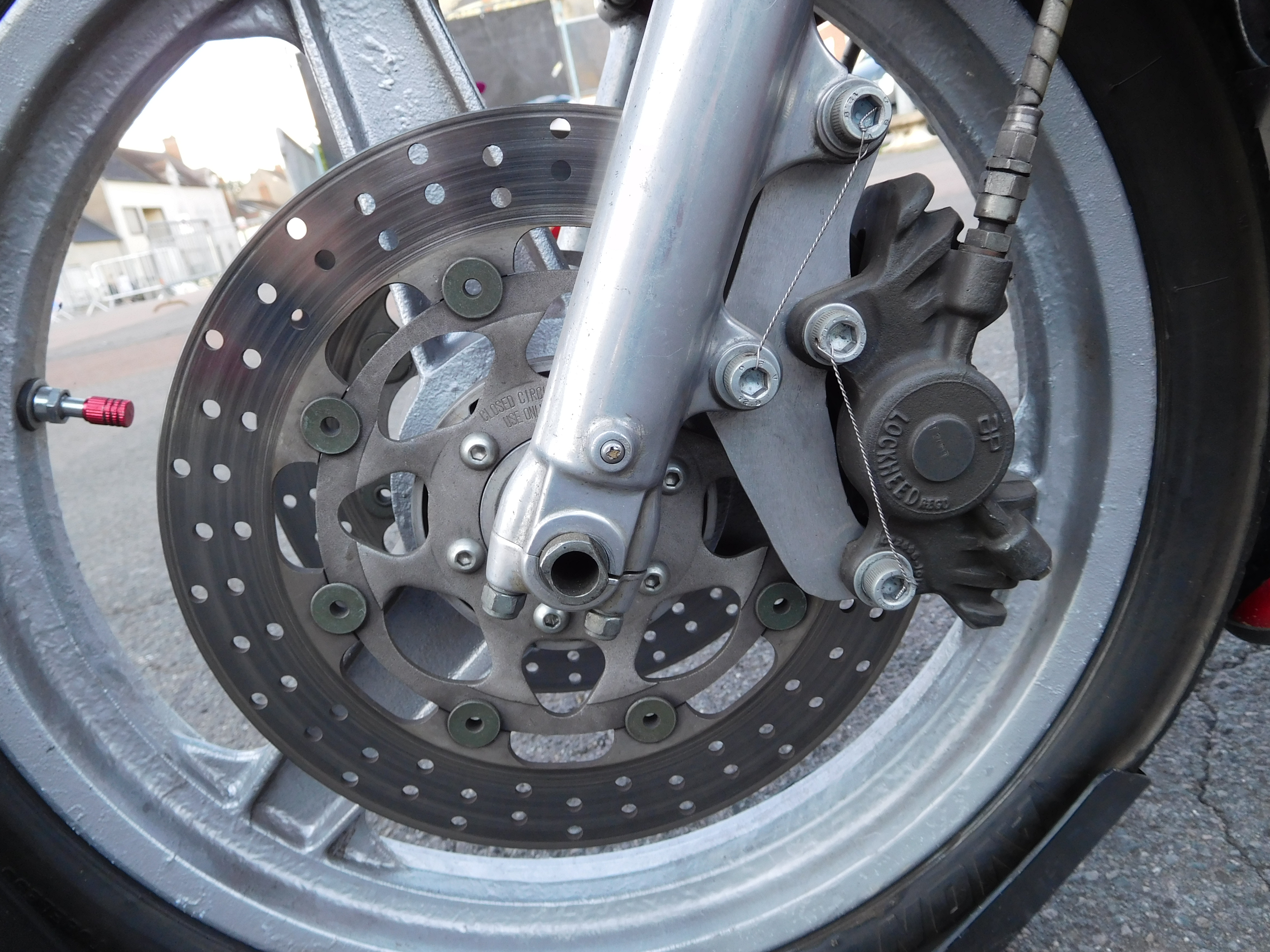
AP Lockheed disc brake caliper

Automotive Products, commonly abbreviated to AP, was an automotive industry components company set up in 1920 by Edward Boughton, Willie Emmott and Denis Brock, to import and sell American-made components to service the fleet of ex-military trucks left behind in Europe after World War I.

In 1928, they obtained a licence for the manufacture and sale of the Lockheed Hydraulic Braking System for the British Isles and Continental Europe, and in the following year they acquired a controlling interest in Zephyr Carburetors Limited which had premises in Clemens Street, Leamington Spa. A subsidiary company named the Lockheed Hydraulic Brake Company Ltd was formed and brake component manufacture began.

In 1931, the Borg & Beck Company Limited was set up to manufacture clutches under American patents from Borg & Beck in the USA. This allowed the company to sell British made Borg & Beck clutches in the United Kingdom, overseas British possessions and the British Empire (except Canada). The same year, the first block of a new purpose-built factory in Tachbrook Road was opened, extending by 1970 to some 70 acres.

The company became the UK's leading manufacturer and supplier of clutches and braking, and was dominant in the market until the end of the 1970s.

AP also developed a close technical partnership with the British Motor Corporation (BMC), in the development of automatic transmissions. One of the most notable products of this collaboration was the unique AP automatic transmission used in the Mini and later BMC/BL compact models. The two companies jointly owned a plant in Kings Norton to produce the transmissions, and the matching variants of the A-series engines to go with them.

The business was bought by BBA (British Belting and Asbestos) in 1986.

The 1990 report stated that trading deteriorated in the second half of the year. A claim against AP in respect to an accommodation vessel for a gas rig, which originated before BBA bought AP, had been resolved and claims against third parties are in process; this was possibly about the AP business in Speke. Generally, the automotive side had seen more of a decline, including Pacific BBA. The clutch business acquired new original equipment business in Europe and the US. The automatic clutch and throttle system (ACTS) which combines electronic sensing and control to combine the convenience of semi-automatic transmission with the cost-effectiveness of manual systems continued to raise interest from manufacturers. This seems to be the start of the idea of an automatic clutch with a manual gear lever or paddles behind the steering wheel. The braking system seemed to be controlling on brakes for specialist vehicles and on an "all makes" replacement part programme - it seemed that AP Leamington decided to get out of high-level original equipment braking during the 80s, leaving it with aftermarket and small levels of OE, a condition that it still has. Steering, suspension, and racing continued to grow, as did the aircraft business. The holding in Landlock in South Africa was sold thus removing the ex-AP South African business, following the creation of Pacific BBA to take over the Australian, and presumably New Zealand, parts of AP.

At this time BBA was extending into many areas including plastics, aviation servicing and high voltage inductors in addition to its existing automotive, aviation, industrial textiles, and friction systems.

By 1991 BBA were in a major recession even though it was still growing. In Spain they acquired Aranceta, a clutch manufacturer, which became AP Spain and a new factory in Paris, presumably at Cergy-Pontoise for the aftermarket. The clutch and braking systems divisions had new contracts, and the US had a 5 year contract with Ford. Production contracts for ACTS, new generation brake and clutch systems and all-plastic hydraulic actuation systems had been received. AP also signed joint development agreements with licensees for electronic controls for automotive transmissions, lightweight braking and a new limited slip differential called SureTrac.

1992 was another bad year and resulted in redundancies and reorganisations. Both the clutch and braking systems continued to grow with both divisions securing new contracts and with new products in development, including the Automatic Clutch System (ACS) for the Renault Safrane, twin-mass flywheels and associated integrated clutch systems, and lightweight disc brakes, presumably the transfer from cast iron to aluminium. The aviation business was going well and they extended the flight servicing to create Signature, which was the last part of BBA and was bought out that year.

In 1993 they sold their holdings in Pacific BBA, thus removing the last of the old AP Australian and New Zealand businesses. A downturn in European automotive from the end of 1992 had reduced the OE business, while the aftermarket continued at the same level. The US side had managed to grow. ACTS had now gone into production, which is believed to be due to the Renault Twingo and Cleo; SureTrac had been licensed to Fuji Univance in Japan, who are now Univance Corporation, and a mechanical parking brake for disc-braked vehicles, at the time fitted to all Land Rover vehicles, was expected to become widespread. AP Clutch acquired a low-cost laser cutting cell to replace press tools and provide fast turnaround.

In 1994 BBA was recovering, and sold some businesses which did not conform to new criteria, established by a new CEO. At this point the group consisted of Transportation, being Automotive Friction and AP, Aviation Services and Aviation Components (AP Speke), and of Industrial covering various textiles and specialist electrics. By then, they had disposed of all of their belting products and the Angus fire production system. Uncompetitive units were closed or relocated, and new cellular manufacturing systems took part in clutch manufacturing.

The BBA 1995 report showed the sale of AP in April 1995 for £181M, plus later considerations if the purchaser, AP Group, achieved certain target internal rates of return. It was regarded as a good business, but was too small to compete on a global scale. The majority of the funding was provided by CIN Venture Nominees, along the shares bought by the staff and directors. The acquisition was for the traditional brake and clutch businesses and for a BBA textile unit in Cleckheaton and Germany which became APTEC. The APPH unit at Speke was retained by BBA.

AP Group 1995 report, for 9 months, showed turnover of £231M and profit of £17M, exceeding budgets. AP Italy had installed a fully automated drum brakes assembly capable of producing 2M brakes a year for Fiat. AP France had built a new manufacturing facility near Orleans for clutch production and R&D. AP Leamington had invested in flexible manufacturing systems, presumably BPCS. They had also created a joint venture for the ACTS system with Kongsberg Automotive.

The 1996 reports showed that the sales and profits for the year were in-line with the 9 month 1995. Investments were made at Leamington and Italy, and tooling was built for new products. Clutch received a contract to supply TMF units to BMW for 4 and 6 cylinder engines. That was expected to continue for 10 years and be worth £170M at 1996 prices. The TMF factory was built in 1997 for full production in 1998 - that is now the only building left on the Leamington site and is owned by Shire Foods. It also had a contract for the new Golf targeting 250,000 units at the end of 1997. Brakes had formed an alliance with ITT Automotive to support braking projects around the world. The aftermarket all-makes strategy led to increased sales. A licence was made with a Chinese business for the supply of clutches to Volkswagen, and a 50/50 Joint Venture had been created with a Turkish clutch manufacturer. The 1997 outlook was expected to be difficult due to the strength of the British pound.

So 1997 was difficult. While the sales and profits in Europe, improved overall sales and profits declined because of exchange rates. Cost reductions and redundancies occurred at Leamington. The Joint Venture AP Kongsberg ACTS business, which was loss making, was sold to Kongsberg Tech-Matic who then listed in Norway, with AP owning 7.5%, which was sold in 1998. They acquired the remaining 30% of AP Japan to give them 100% and 1998 ceased a low margin trading operation from them. The sale of the Leamington site was followed by a leaseback agreement. From this all of blocks 0, 1, 2, 3, 5, 9 and north of block 12 were closed and put into development during 1997 and 1998.

1998 showed an increase in profit even though sales had decreased. After a reorganisation, all of the OE clutch and drum brake units in UK, Italy, Spain and Turkey were managed by the Italian team. The USA and French clutch businesses were bought under a common technical leadership, probably because of PFCH. UK, France, Benelux, Germany and Japan aftermarkets were integrated. A new drum brake extension had been made in Italy, with clutch investments scheduled for 1999. Clutch development in France had been extended for new orders and the US had won new orders for 2000 onwards. Production of the TMF units had been blocked by a patent dispute with a competitor (LUK). They did, eventually, win the case, but by then the AP business was in pieces. A decision was made to open a factory in Brazil. In Italy new contracts for drum brakes for Ford and Fiat had started, a new aluminium wheel cylinder facility had been commissioned and clutches for Volkswagen had transferred from the UK. France had started a programme to supply a clutch system to Fiat integrated with the Italian business. In Brazil a site was acquired for a new factory for clutch and clutch actuation, as part of the US business. The TMF patent court issue ended when the Munich court ruled in AP’s favour, though the competitor had appealed. Against that, AP has filed a counterclaim for unjustified interference with AP's business. This became a problem when LUK, having acquired Kongsberg Tech-Matic, sued, and lost, AP Group and AP USA regarding information that they thought should be in the business.

The idea was to separate the UK aftermarket business, APDS, from the OE manufacturing, APOE. APDS represented about 35% of the sales turnover and was sold to Delphi Automotive Systems in Feb 2002 for £40M. Along with that it took over blocks 16, 17, 19 and 20. Along with the split between APDS and APOE, the OE units were split into two businesses - AP UK (Clutch) and AP Hydraulics, leaving AP Group with a small office in Block 12. As part of that, APDS and AP UK decided on which people they wanted, and left everyone else to Hydraulics. As part of that, IT and Finance were left last and finally told in a meeting one morning.

In July 2000 they sold AP Racing to Brembo for £23M, against sales of £17M. At that point AP Racing had already relocated to Coventry. France had acquired new nominations from Renault and Fiat which should double its turnover. Drum brakes had new nominations from Renault, Ford and Fiat which should double their sales. The US had acquired contracts with Daimler Chrysler. TMF continued to work with potential customers to resolve a vibration issue. AP Hydraulics had acquired new contracts.

2001 and 2002 reports show that both AP UK and AP Hydraulics had agreed that AP Hydraulics would relocate in the SE corner of Block 15, thus enabling Blocks 4, 6, 7, 8, 10 and 12 to be released. All of clutch and braking systems were showing new contracts at this point. In 2002 AP UK, AP Spain, AP Elastomers (ex Rubbers) and other businesses were sold at a loss of £8M, half which consisted of additional pension contributions. The European businesses continue to grow. However, the UK pension scheme was under-funded due to the value of the stock market and the increased costs of pension supply.

In 2003 the AP Group began to decline. It had sold its Italian and American businesses, including Brazil, and still had problems with the pension scheme. In March 2004 control of the business was taken over by a subsidiary, Whitnash plc, which was owned by the preference shareholders of the original AP Associates, since AP Group was unable to repay amounts due to them and were removed from control. As well as having to put funds into the pension scheme, it was also having to repay on its secured senior and mezzanine debts from the MBO. In April 2004 90% of AP France was sold for a nominal sum.

Whitnash was a subsidiary of AP Group and was the holding company for some of the businesses in the AP Group and had sold all of its assets to a subsidiary of AP Group (probably AP International) in November 1999. From that point onwards, Whitnash was dependent on income due to it, which included the AP logo trademark. The sales, by AP Group, in 2003 and 2004, intended to repay the secure senior and mezzanine debts, were less than expected. Italy was hit by a high corporate tax and the declining market share of Fiat. The fall in the US dollar reduced the sales of it. In addition, changes to UK pension legislation in June 2003 meant that a contingent liability on the AP pension was increased by £40M.

Understanding the situations between Whitnash, AP Group, AP International, AP Investments and other parts of the group were complex, and included difficulties over other properties which were acquired in 1990/91, and a legal case in Italy that dated back to a subsidiary acquisition, in 1978. Whitnash also had a lease over the Leamington site until 2018 which it sub-let to the remaining parts of AP, some of which had earlier break conditions.

As a result, AP Group, including AP Hydraulics and APTEC (UK), went into administration in early 2006, mainly because it could not provide funds to the pension scheme, which was transferred to the Pension Protection Scheme.

Regarding the other Leamington businesses, Dephi eventually went into a US administration after a few years. AP UK renamed itself to AP Driveline in 2002 and went into admin in 2005, was taken over and then went into administration again before it was acquired by Raicam, who acquired the AP Italian clutch business in 2005. Both Delphi and Raicam relocated from the site around 2018. APDS/Delphi took over the Borg & Beck and Lockheed trade names and AP UK got to use the AP logo; AP Hydraulics refused to pay for it. In April 2006 AP Hydraulics, also with the trade name AP Braking, was acquired by the Caparo group and was renamed as Caparo AP Braking. Caparo group was an Indian owned group of businesses, created by Lord Paul of Marylebone, about 50 years ago. He was of Indian origin and had moved into the UK for treatment, unsuccessfully, for his daughter, He then built and acquired many businesses, generally around the Midlands and involved in the automotive area. The UK business was based in Oldbury along with several other of their businesses, and they were building factories in India.

Lord Paul's son Angad, who ran the UK businesses, was "Very good" at acquiring odd businesses. One of these was a furniture and design business called Established and Sons who make odd, very expensive furniture. Another was the Freestream business in Basingstoke, which was built by a couple of design and engineers involved with the McLaren F1, who decided that they could build a road-legal racing car. The business became Caparo Vehicle Products and the car became the Caparo T1. That was very fast and broke the track circuit at Top Gear, except that they used the racing version rather than the road version. They were all designers, not manufacturers. They sent one of the product managers down to them, and then followed that with their Operations Director, but in the end they had to relocate them to Leamington. In practice they managed to build 18 vehicles and sold a few, mainly for racing. Part of the idea was to demonstrate a better way of building vehicles. Following on from that they got a contract to make F3 racing cars for Renault, but in practice had a lot of quality problems with them and lost it the next year. Eventually it was relocated elsewhere in the Caparo group and renamed. The Caparo Vehicle Technology name was transferred to Caparo AP Braking.

As a business they kept on going, gradually losing staff and customers, especially the loss of Land Rover which really left them with Morgan as the major original equipment customer. They concentrated on the aftermarket business where there is a strong desire for replacement parts for 50/60/70s vehicles to match the original parts when they were built. They also got involved with a French attempt to build an electric car and with a UK electric van conversion, but neither of these was successful. Although they were still making new braking items, there never seemed to be any major customers, or sales people, for them, especially if you compare that to Alcon, who had taken several of their designers.

In 2015, the UK Caparo Industries group gradually fell apart and went into administration in Oct. 2015, followed by the death of Angad Paul in early Nov. in his penthouse; apparently by accident. Most of the businesses were acquired by Liberty House Group, owned by Sanjeev Gupta, who is involved in ferrous and non-ferrous metal trading, metals recycling, steel and aluminium production, and engineering products and services. They had managed to acquire and run much of the UK steel manufacturing and were extended into other areas. They retained the ex-Caparo management team to run that part of the group.

Liberty did seem to be a better option than Caparo, and they also managed to acquire a few associated businesses. These included a bike manufacturer, later merged with a Scottish business; a specialist ex-SAS group dealing with off road vehicles in Hereford; and a business in Daventry called Shiftec, who build electronic controls for clutch, braking and throttle system, and was then relocated to Leamington.

In Leamington, as the old Delphi area was replaced by new units, they acquired a new unit in the parking area just north of Block 19 and relocated to it in April 2020, along with a new company name of Shiftec (Leamington). By then, the rest of Block 15 had already been cleared and now their part had gone and that part of the old AP site is being redeveloped. The only part of AP that was left was the old TMF unit which is owned by Shire Foods.

== Manumatic and Newtowndrive automated clutch systems ==
The Manumatic and Newtondrive systems are also known as "two-pedal transmissions". They relieve the driver of the need for skill in operating clutch and engine speed in conjunction with the gear change. At one time, Manumatic solely referred to an older type of semi-automatic transmission with an automatic clutch system, but today, the term "manumatic" generally just refers to standard torque converter automatic transmissions, with the ability to override the transmission computer, and select gears "manually," via the electronics.

Manumatic

A clutch servo powered by the vacuum at the induction manifold operated the automatic clutch - a conventional clutch incorporating centrifugal operation. A switch in the gear lever operated a solenoid valve so that when the gear lever moved, the clutch was disengaged. A control unit made throttle adjustments to keep the engine speed matched to the driven clutch plate and also varied the speed of clutch operation appropriate to road speed.

Newtondrive

The Newtondrive system differed in making a provision for choke control and a cable linkage from the clutch operating mechanism to the throttle.

The systems could be fitted to smaller cars such as the Ford Anglia.
