= Seneffe =

Municipality in Hainaut Province, Wallonia, Belgium

Seneffe: Sinefe (Walloon)
- Municipality
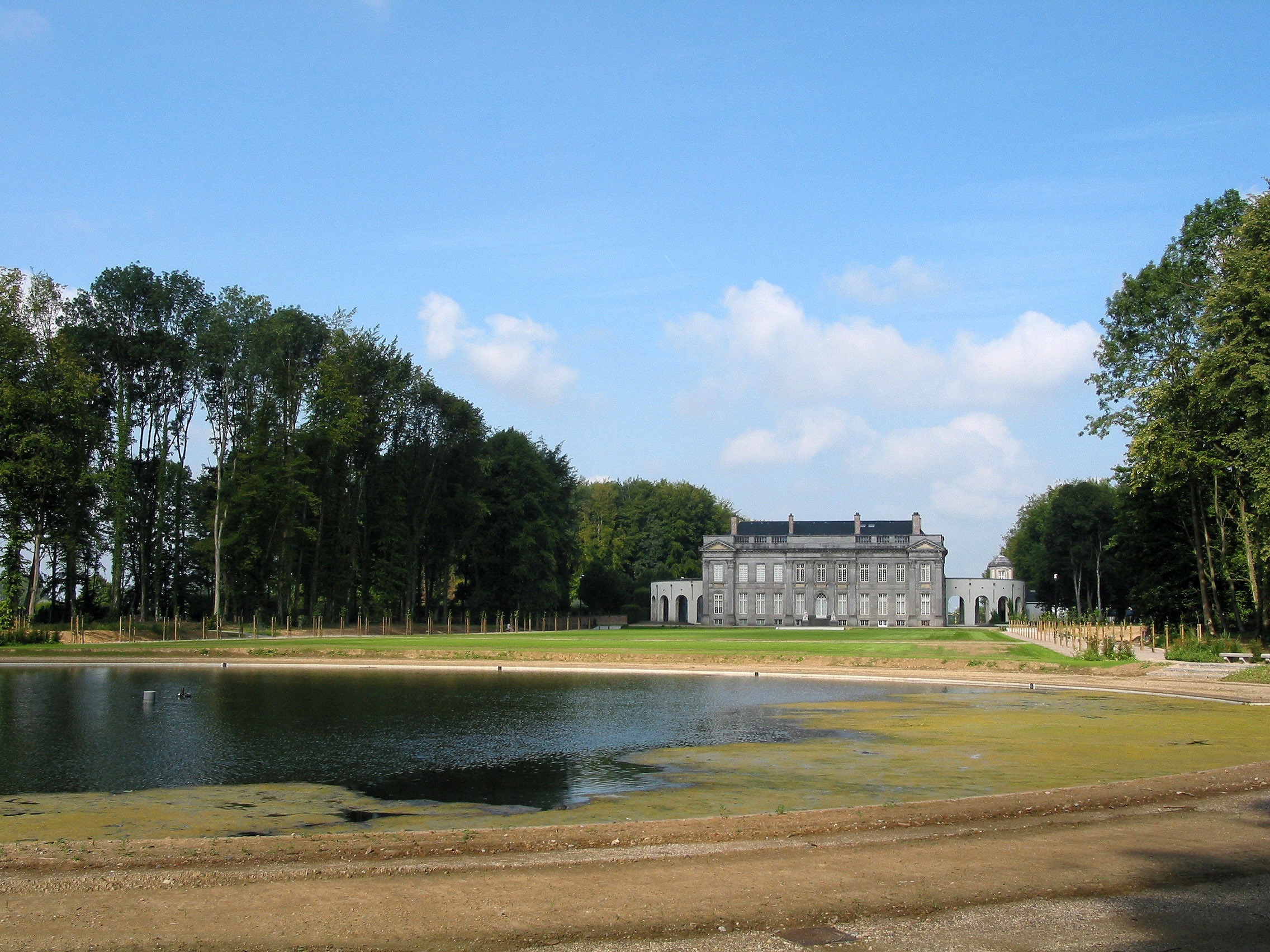
- Château de Seneffe

- Coat of arms

- Location of Seneffe in Hainaut
- Interactive map of Seneffe
- Location in Belgium
- Coordinates: 50°31′N 04°15′E
- Country: Belgium
- Community: French Community
- Region: Wallonia
- Province: Hainaut
- Arrondissement: Soignies

Government
  - Mayor: Bénédicte Poll (MR) (LB)
  - Governing party: LB - Les Engagés

Area
  - Total: 63.77 km^{2} (24.62 sq mi)

Population (2018-01-01)
  - Total: 11,272
  - Density: 176.8/km^{2} (457.8/sq mi)
- Postal codes: 7180, 7181
- NIS code: 55085
- Area codes: 064
- Website: www.seneffe.be

Seneffe (French pronunciation: [sənɛf]; Walloon: Sinefe) is a municipality of Wallonia located in the province of Hainaut, Belgium.

On 1 January 2006 Seneffe had a total population of 10,743. The total area is 62.77 km^{2} which gives a population density of 171 inhabitants per km^{2}.

The municipality consists of the following districts: Arquennes, Familleureux, Feluy, Petit-Rœulx-lez-Nivelles, and Seneffe.

The Château de Seneffe, now a museum belonging to the French Community of Belgium, is located in the municipality.

Seneffe was the site of a battle in 1674 between French and Dutch armies during the Franco-Dutch War.

== British Leyland ==
Between 1965 and 1982 Seneffe was the location of a car plant belonging to British Leyland, which in its later years assembled models including the Mini and the Austin Allegro from crated kits shipped from the company's Cowley facility. A significant milestone was reached in June 1977 when the plant produced its 500,000th vehicle, an Austin Allegro 1300 Special. The Seneffe plant was closed in 1982 as the company's aging model range lost market share across Europe, with further loss of demand resulting from the depressed state of the UK economy at the time. With alternative employment opportunities limited, the plant closure triggered considerable bitterness locally.

== Monuments ==
- Seneffe Castle
- Feluy Castle: Residence of Philippe François de Berghes, 1st Prince of Grimberghen.
