= Austin Allegro =

Car manufactured 1973-1982

Overview
- Manufacturer: Austin (British Leyland)
- Also called: Vanden Plas 1500 / 1.5 or 1.7; Innocenti Regent (Italy)
- Production: 1973–1982
- Assembly: United Kingdom: Longbridge, Birmingham (Longbridge plant); Belgium: Seneffe; Italy: Lambrate, Milan (Innocenti: 1974–1975); New Zealand: Auckland; Petone (NZMC)
- Designer: Harris Mann

Body and chassis
- Class: Small family car (C)
- Body style: 2-door saloon 3-door estate 4-door saloon
- Layout: FF layout

Powertrain
- Engine: 1.0 L A-Series I4; 1.1 L A-Series I4; 1.3 L A-Series I4; 1.5 L E-Series I4; 1.7 L E-Series I4

Dimensions
- Wheelbase: 2,438 mm (96 in)
- Length: 3,861 mm (152 in) (saloon); 3,993 mm (157.2 in) (estate)
- Width: 1,600 mm (63 in)
- Height: 1,397 mm (55 in)
- Kerb weight: 869 kg (1,915 lb) (approx)

Chronology
- Predecessor: Austin 1100/1300
- Successor: Austin Maestro (Hatchback); Austin Montego (Saloon)

The Austin Allegro is a small family car that was manufactured by the Austin-Morris division of British Leyland (BL) from 1973 until 1982. The same vehicle was built in Italy by Innocenti between 1974 and 1975 and sold as the Innocenti Regent. The Allegro was designed as a replacement for the Austin 1100 and 1300 models. In total, 642,350 Austin Allegros were produced during its 10-year production life, most of which were sold on the home market, less than a third of 2.1 million 1100s and 1300s sold in the previous 11 years.

It was built and sold by British Leyland alongside the hatchback Austin Maxi (launched in 1969) and the 1971 rear-wheel-drive Morris Marina. All three were eventually replaced by the Austin Maestro in 1983.

== Design ==
British Leyland used a saloon design for the Allegro rather than a hatchback, as the company had decided that the Austin Maxi should have a hatchback as its unique selling point.

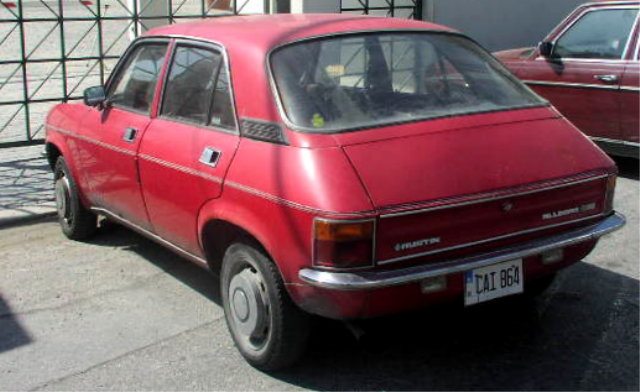
Rear of an exported Allegro

The Allegro used front-wheel drive, with the familiar A-Series engine with a sump-mounted transmission. The higher-specification models used the SOHC E-Series engine from the Maxi, in 1500 cc and 1750 cc displacements. The two-box saloon bodyshell was suspended using the new Hydragas system (derived from the previous Hydrolastic system used on the 1100/1300).

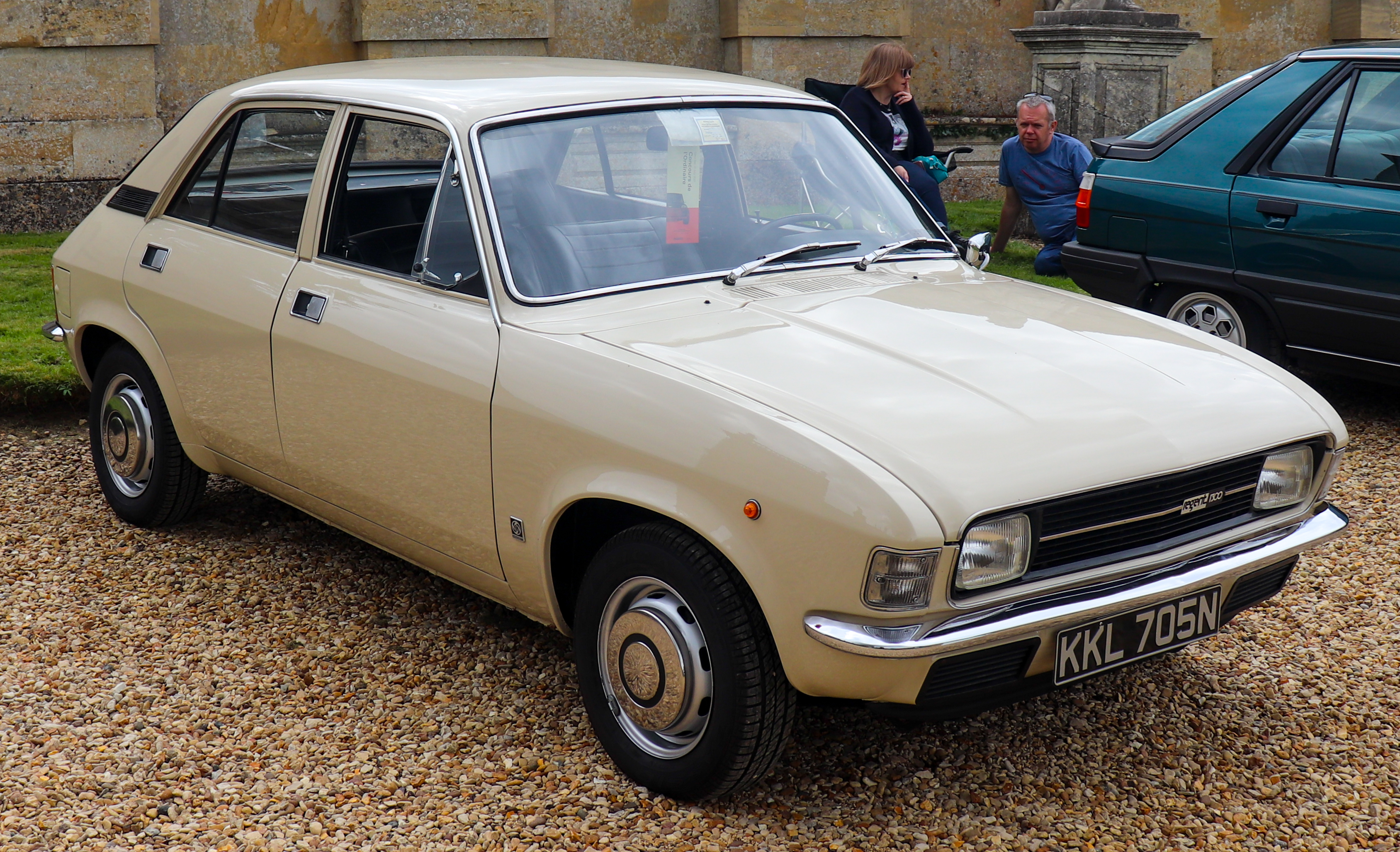
The Allegro was assembled by Innocenti in Italy, where it was badged as the Innocenti Regent.

Stylistically, it went against the sharp-edged styling cues largely led by Italian designer Giorgetto Giugiaro that were becoming fashionable, and featured rounded panel work. The original styling proposal, by Harris Mann, had the same sleek, wedge-like shape of the Princess; but British Leyland management, keen to control costs, wanted to install the existing E-Series engine and bulky heating system from the Marina. Hence, it became impossible to incorporate the low bonnet line as envisaged: the bodyshell began to look more and more bloated and tubby. This was acceptable to BL, however, which according to Jeff Daniels' book British Leyland, The Truth About The Cars, published in 1980, wanted to follow the Citroën approach of combining advanced technology with styling that eschewed mainstream trends in order to create long-lasting "timeless" models. Its unfashionable shape was thus not a problem to the company. The final car bore little resemblance to Mann's original concept that had originally been conceived as an 1100/1300 reskin.

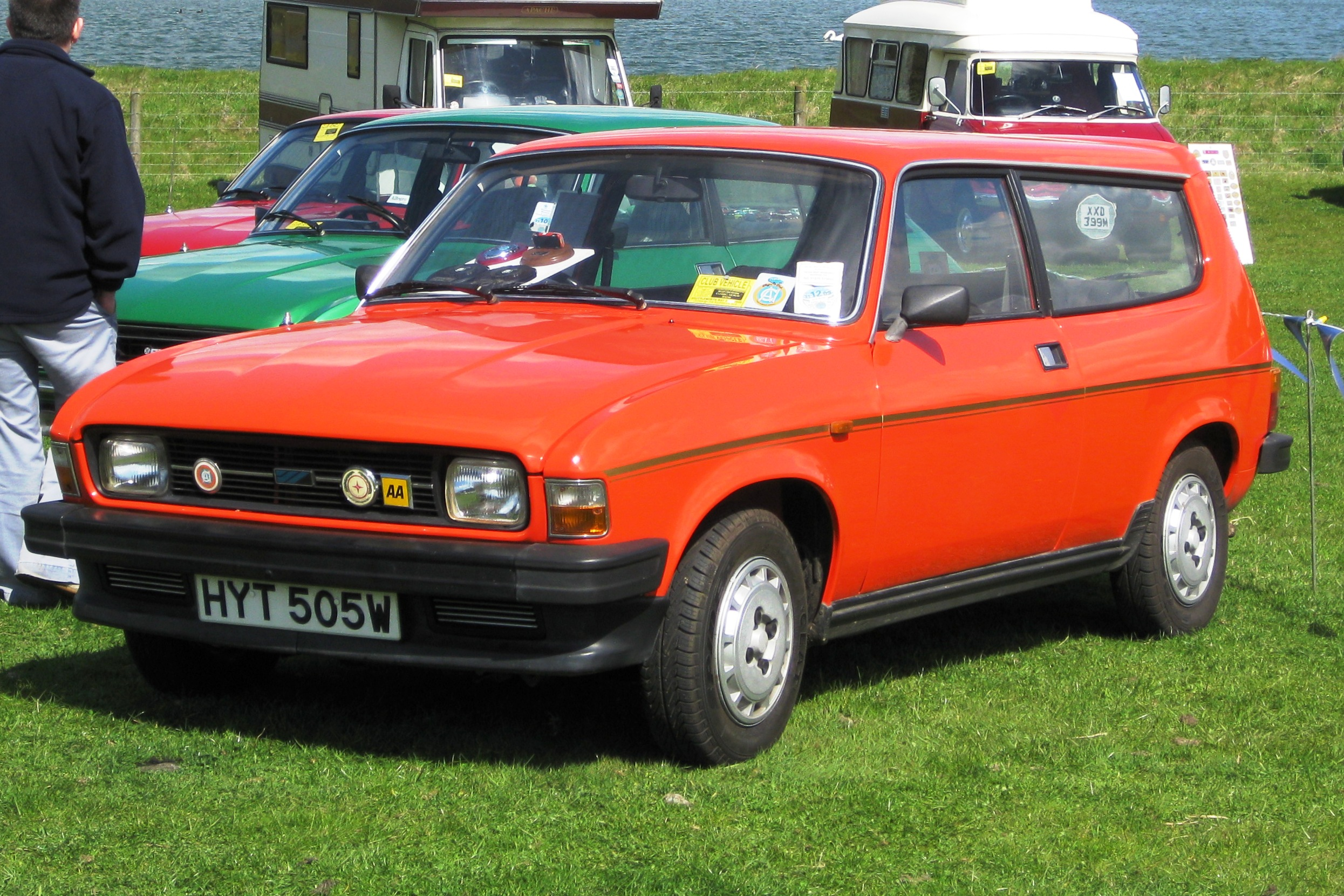
Allegro buyers preferring a car with a tailgate had to opt for the estate (seen here in post-1979 facelift style).

BL avoided, with the Allegro, the full extent of badge engineering that had defined the marketing of the car's predecessor the BMC ADO16, which was mostly sold as an Austin (although it was badged under almost all of the brands that BMC/BL owned). Nevertheless, BL introduced in September 1974 an upmarket Allegro, branded as the Vanden Plas 1500/automatic. This featured a prominent grille at the front, and an interior enhanced by a range of modifications designed to attract customers who were inclined toward tradition. This included: special seats upholstered in real leather, with reclining backrests; deep-pile carpets; extra sound insulation; a new instrument panel in walnut; walnut folding tables for the rear passengers; nylon headlining; and for the luggage, a fully trimmed boot. In 1974, at a time when the UK starting price for the Austin Allegro was given as £1159 (£11,731.77 in 2018 money), BL was quoting, at launch, a list price of £1951 (£19,748.65 in 2018) for the Vanden Plas 1500. The Allegro name was not used on this version.

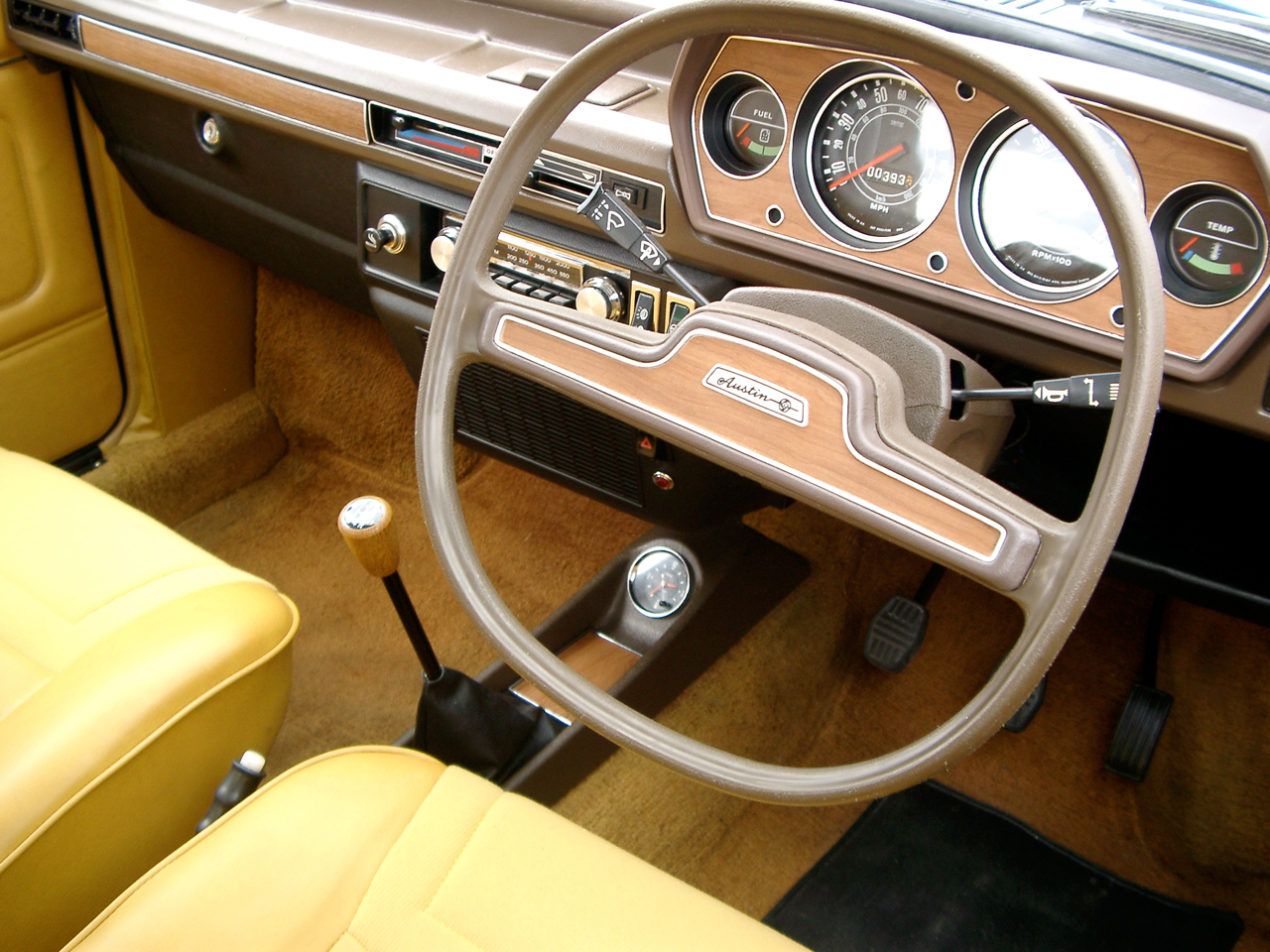
Quartic Steering Wheel as featured in the Allegro at launch

Early Allegro models featured a "quartic" steering wheel, which was rectangular with rounded sides. This was touted as allowing extra room between the base of the steering wheel and the driver's legs. The quartic steering wheel was unpopular, and was dropped in 1974 when the SS model was replaced by the HL. The VP 1500 was never introduced with one, despite it being featured in the owner's manual. Despite this feature only having appeared on certain models for a limited time, the Allegro has always been associated with the criticism that it "had a square steering wheel". It could now be seen as being ahead of its time, given that today many cars have squared-off-lower-section steering wheels and some Formula 1 cars have square steering wheels. Some other BL cars from this period were fitted with a semi-quartic steering wheel, such as the Rover SD1.

In April 1975, a three-door estate car version was added to the range. Allegros were now coming off the production line with the same conventional steering wheel as the Morris Marina, although the company waited till early June 1975 to announce, rather quietly, the demise of the Allegro's quartic steering wheel, presumably to give time for older cars to emerge from the sales and distribution network. Similar to the two-door saloon, the Allegro estate had a coachline and also featured a rear wash-wipe. The spare wheel was housed under the rear load floor area. It was only in production for about 100 days before the arrival of the Series 2 model, making Series I Allegro estate rarer than most other models in the range.

There was a similar situation in New Zealand, where the New Zealand Motor Corporation, which at the time had CKD kit assembly plants in Newmarket and Panmure, Auckland, and Petone, Wellington, began Allegro assembly in 1975 with the circular steering wheel. Only a few hundred 'Mark Ones', among the first locally-built car models to have a factory-fitted heated rear window, were built before the 'Mark Two' was launched. Most Allegros sold in New Zealand had the 1300 cc A-series OHV engine and four-speed manual gearbox. Later, the 1.5-litre OHC engine was offered with a four-speed automatic gearbox, but this was eventually dropped. NZMC, moving away from UK-sourced cars to models from its Honda franchise (it began Civic assembly in 1976, with the Accord following in 1978), later rationalised Allegro output to offer just two paint colours, metallic brown or solid dark blue, with a cream vinyl roof and brown interior trim. One batch of 48 'Mark Three' CKD kits was shipped from England after NZMC had decided to drop the Allegro in 1980, and these were assembled and sold, also in brown or cream; these rare cars have four round headlights rather than two square units, and different tail lights, plus a restyled dashboard.

=== Dimensions ===
1977 Vanden Plas 1500

- Overall length: 3,861 mm (152 in)
- Overall width: 1,600 mm (63 in)
- Height: 1,397 mm (55 in)
- Wheelbase: 2,438 mm (96 in)
- Track: 1,346 mm (53 in)
- Weight: 1,915 lb (869 kg)

The Allegro was fitted with 13" pressed-steel wheels fitted with 145 tyres, 155 on 1750, Sport and Vanden Plas derivatives.

== Allegro 2 (1975–1979) ==
Launched in time for the London Motor Show in October 1975, the Allegro 2 had the same bodyshells but featured a new grille, reversing lights on most models and some interior changes to increase rear seat room. The estate gained a new coachline running over the wing top lip and window edges. Changes were also made to the suspension, braking, engine mounts and drive shafts.

Since the original Allegro had been launched more than two years earlier, several of BL's key rivals in Europe had launched new competitors - these included the MK2 Ford Escort, as well as the groundbreaking and highly acclaimed Volkswagen Golf. A popular Japanese rival, the 120Y generation of the Datsun Sunny, had also been launched in Europe soon after the Allegro. General Motors had also introduced the Vauxhall Chevette, a slightly smaller car, but which competed with larger rivals due to the practicality of its hatchback body.

Two-door Austin Allegro 1300 saloon (1978)

At the end of 1976 British Leyland confirmed that it was holding exploratory talks with trades union representatives concerning the possible transfer of Allegro production from Longbridge to the company's plant at Seneffe in Belgium. The Belgian plant was already assembling the cars for continental European markets using CKD kits shipped from the UK. The stated objective of the transfer was to free up capacity at Longbridge for the manufacture of the forthcoming ADO88 Mini replacement. In the event, the ADO88 project was abandoned and the eventual Mini replacement, the less ambitiously engineered Austin Metro, did not go on sale for another four years. Whether for reasons of politics or of customer demand or of cost, at a time of rapid currency realignment, Allegros for the UK market continued to be manufactured in the UK; the Belgian plant was closed in the early 1980s, by which time Allegro demand in continental Europe had faltered and BL's Austin-Morris division clearly had more production capacity than product demand.

Some models of Allegro 2 made for non-UK markets were equipped with four round headlights, rather than the usual two rectangular units.

Only weeks before the launch of the Allegro 3, 1979 saw the release of the 1.7l Allegro Equipe; a two-door sport-style model in silver with red-and-orange hockey stick–shaped cheatlines and alloy wheels manufactured by GKN. The car (without the distinctive trim) was unveiled to the press at Sherburn-in-Elmet in North Yorkshire. The Equipe was intended to compete with the Golf GT and the Escort RS; by now though the aging Allegro with its lack of hatchback and dated styling struggled against these offerings and sales were poor.

== Allegro 3 (1979–1982) ==
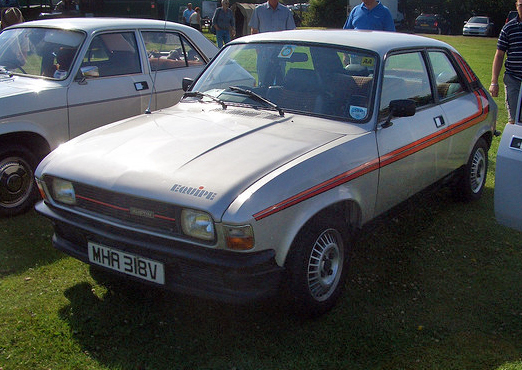
1980 Equipe 1.7

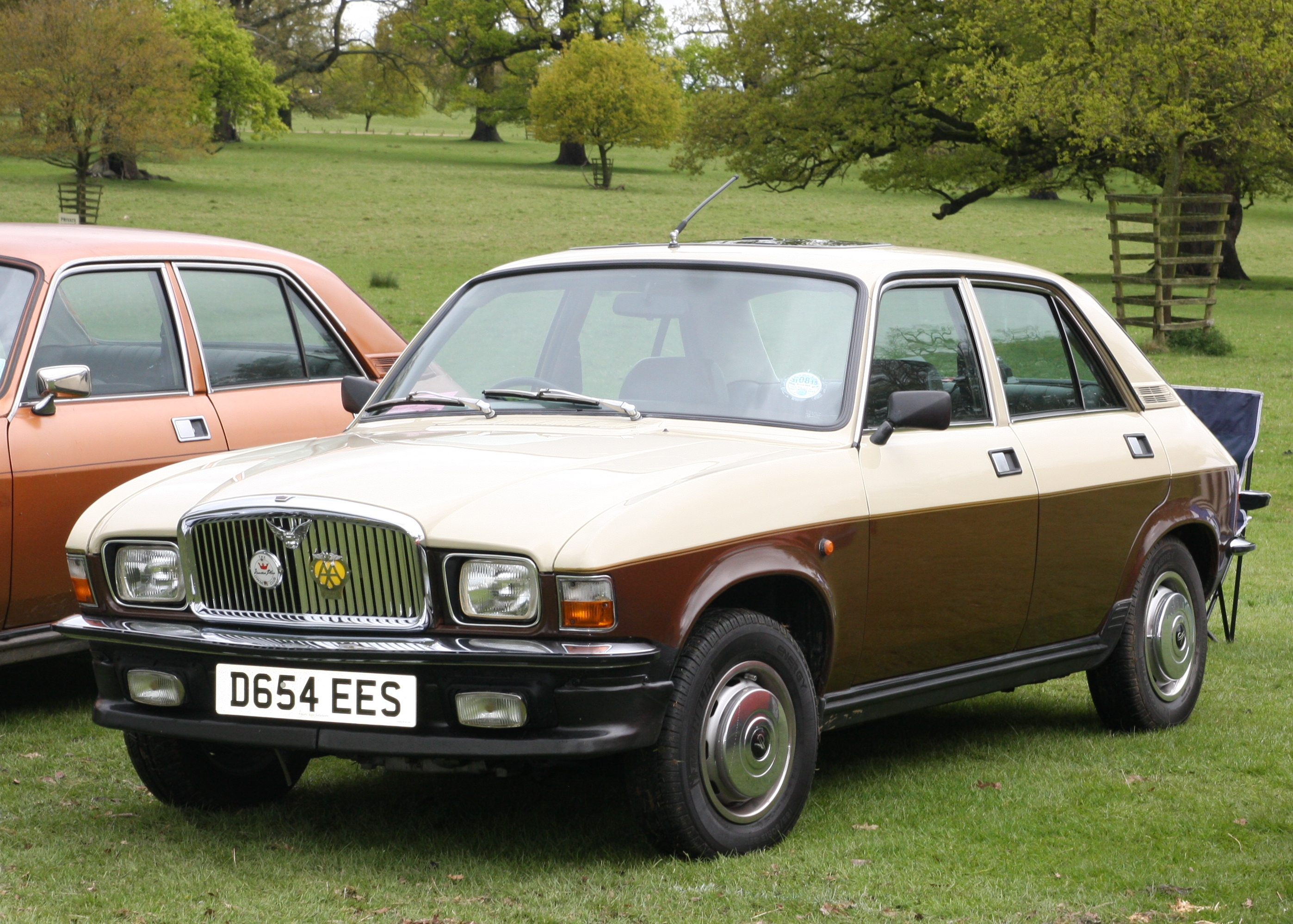
1980 Vanden Plas 1.5

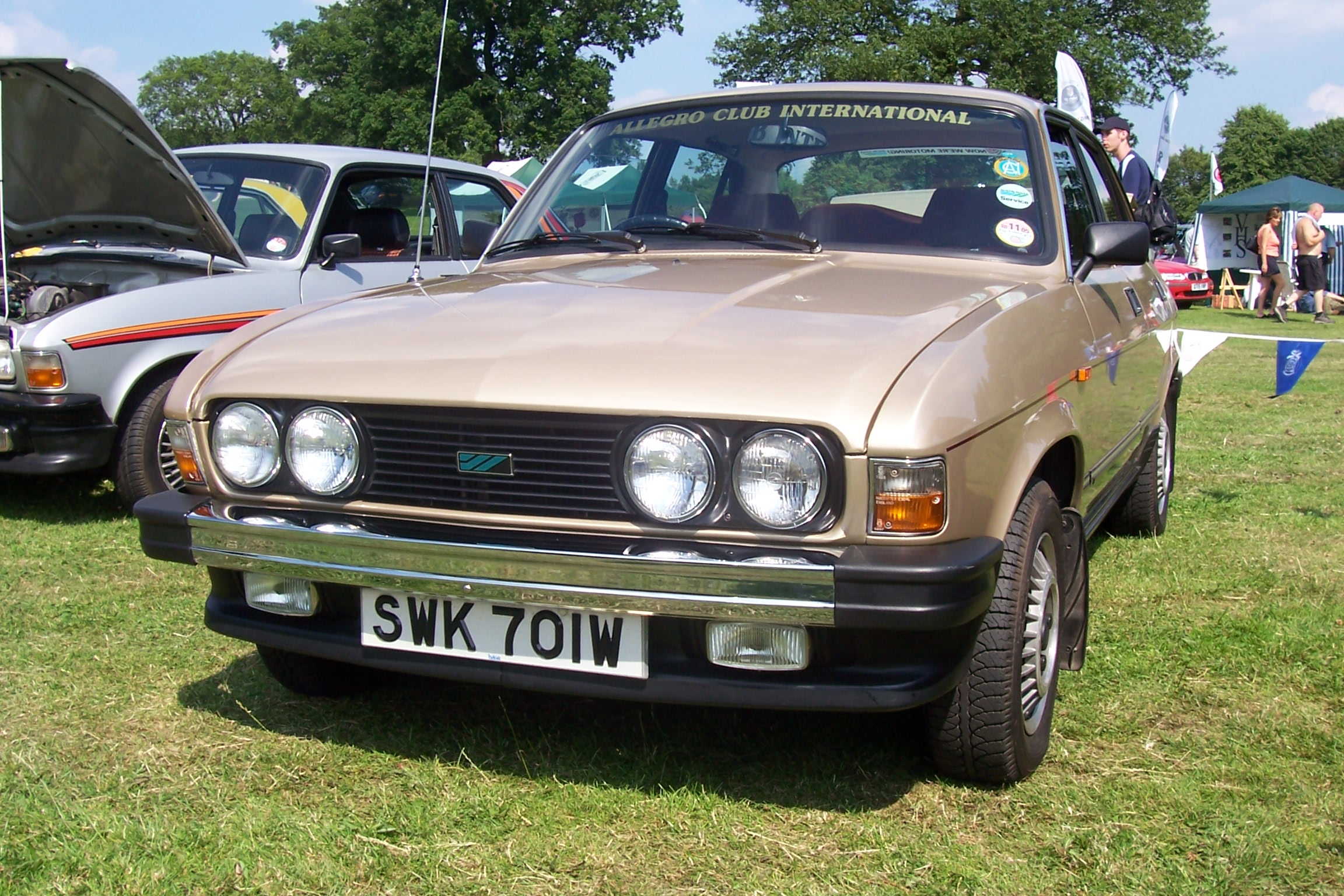
1981 Allegro 3 with round headlights.

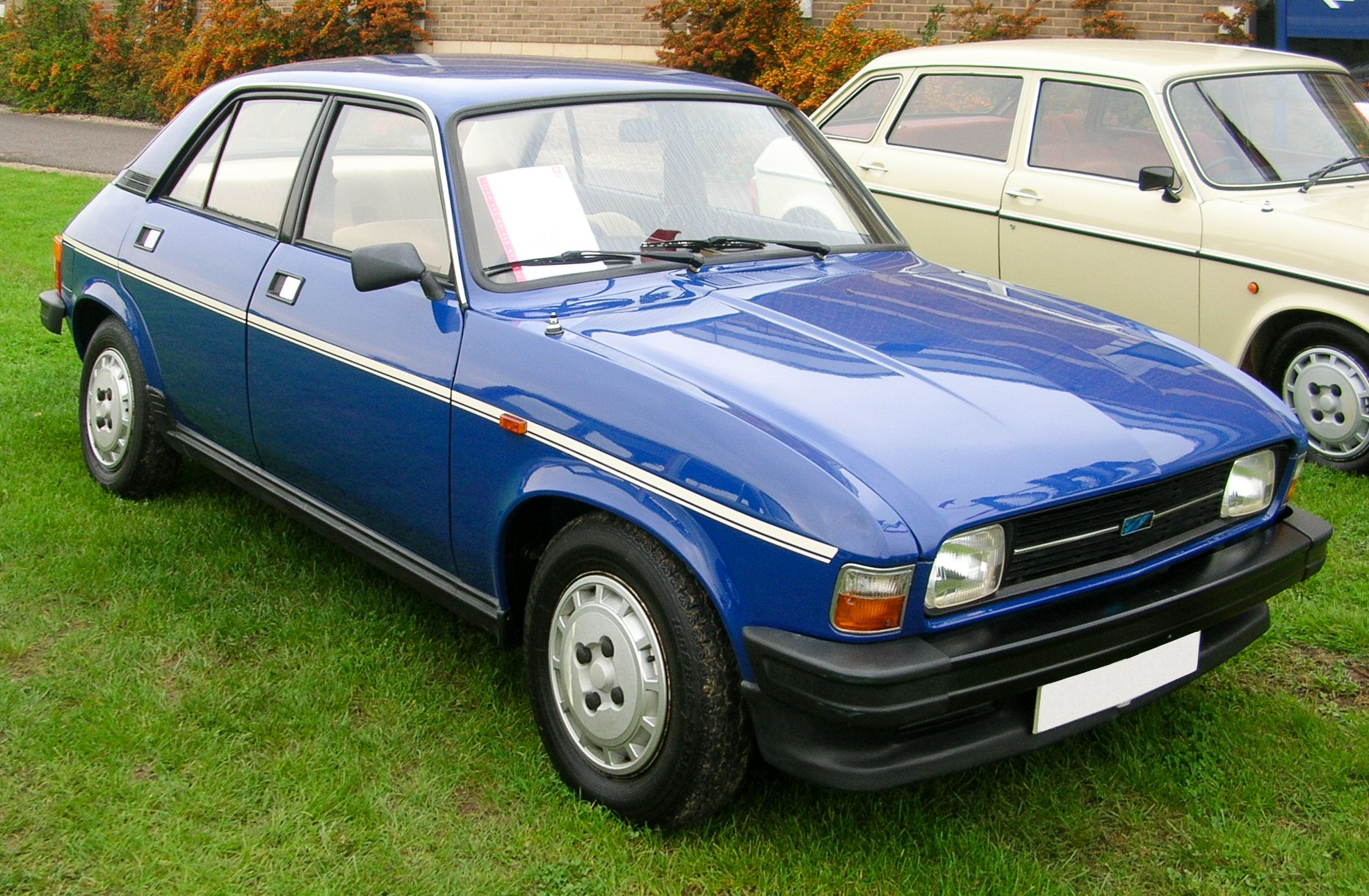
The Allegro 3 with its modernised styling.

The Allegro 3, introduced at the end of 1979, used the "A-Plus" version of the 1.0-litre A-Series engine (developed for the forthcoming new Metro), and featured some cosmetic alterations in an attempt to keep the momentum going, but by then the Allegro was outdated, and was now up against high-tech opposition in the form of the Ford Escort III and Vauxhall Astra Mk.1/Opel Kadett D, both launched within a year of the Allegro's facelift and both featured hatchback bodies with front-wheel-drive. The cosmetic alterations were fairly minimal; the Allegro 3 gained a new grille with the new Austin-Morris "chevron" logo; it carried the Allegro 3 name, bore a larger bumper and gained additional side indicators, whilst the rear boot lid on saloons was superficially restyled with the number plate moved from below the rear bumper and revised rear lamp clusters to accommodate the now compulsory fitment of fog lamps. The interior was modernised with new components such as a new upper dashboard moulding (famously using the same air vents as the Jaguar XJ6), a more modern instrument binnacle and a round four spoke steering wheel. By now, however, British Leyland was working on an all-new car to replace the Allegro and Maxi during the early 1980s - the LC10 - which would eventually emerge as the Austin Maestro.

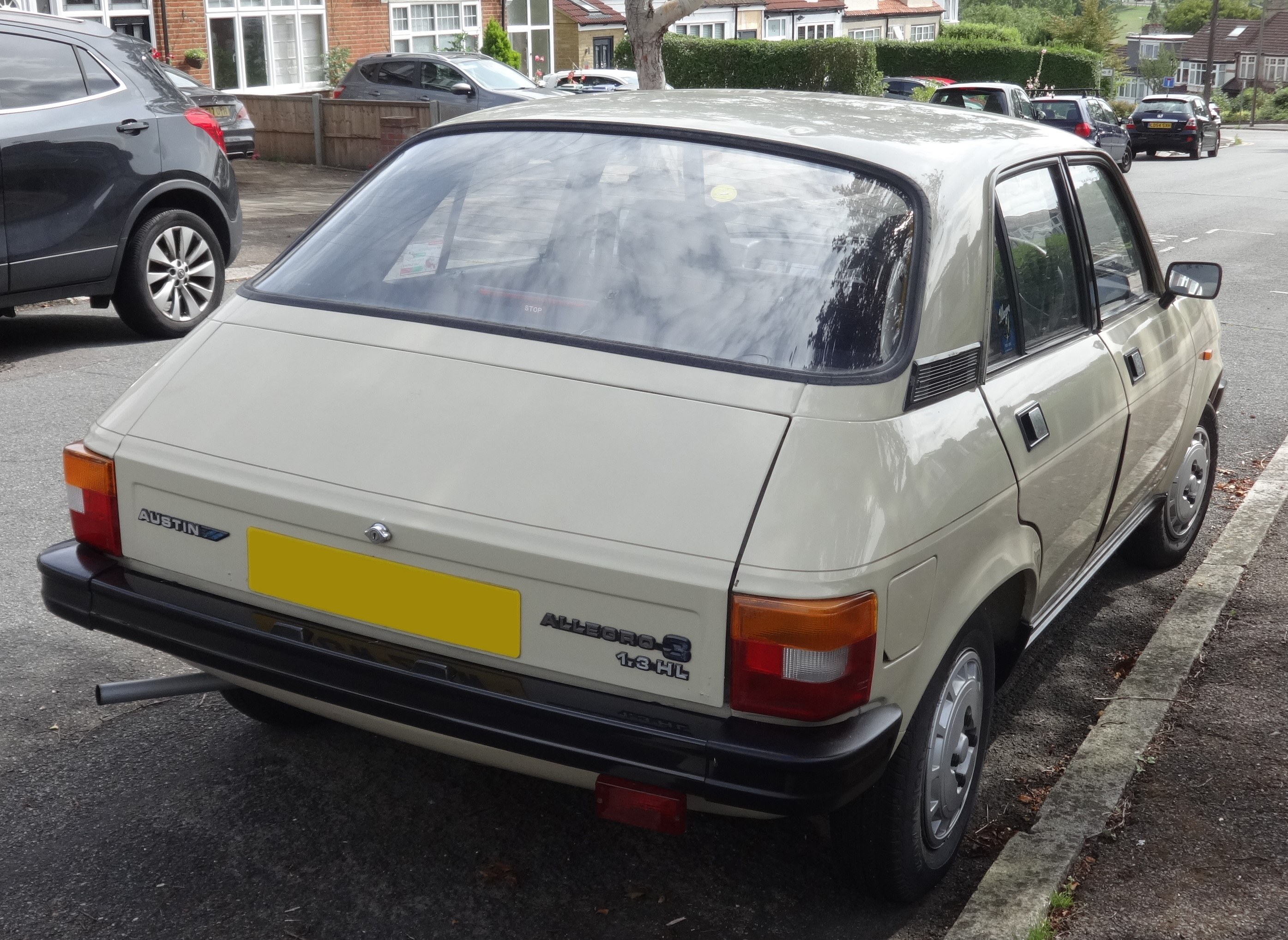
Allegro 3 (rear)

British Leyland entered the small hatchback market – pioneered during the 1970s by the likes of the Renault 5 and Volkswagen Polo, with its Metro which was launched in October 1980. The Metro would be built at the Longbridge plant which had just been expanded to provide adequate production capacity for the new car. But with BL hoping to sell more than 100,000 Metros a year in Britain alone, more capacity for production was needed and production of the Allegro and the Mini were pruned back as a result. The base models of the slightly larger Triumph Acclaim, the first product of BL's alliance with Honda introduced in 1981 also acted as a substitute for the Allegro until the Maestro launched.

After 1980, the Allegro failed to feature in the top 10 best selling new cars in Britain, barely a decade since its predecessor had been Britain's most popular new car, though this fall in sales was compensated by the large sales figures achieved by the smaller Metro, as well as the fact that the slightly larger Triumph Acclaim was among Britain's top 10 selling cars by 1982.

The Vanden Plas models were rebranded as the 1.5 and the 1.7, the 1.5 having a twin carburettor 1500 cc engine and a manual gearbox, while the 1.7 had a single carburettor 1750cc engine and an automatic gearbox.

Some models of Allegro 3 (the early HL and later HLS models) were equipped with four round headlights, rather than the more usual two rectangular ones.

Allegro production, which had lasted for nearly a decade, finally finished in March 1982. Its successor, the Austin Maestro, went into production in November 1982 and was officially launched on 1 March 1983. The backlog of unsold Allegro 3 models remained sufficient to stock dealerships into 1983, well after the Maestro had launched.

== Reputation ==
Upon its launch the Allegro was not particularly badly received by critics, but the gearchange drew criticism and the "quartic" steering wheel "comprising four curves joined together by four straight lines, similar to the shape of a television screen", fitted partly in order to compensate for the shortage of space between the driver and the rather low steering column, was widely derided by motoring journalists, especially when faced with the manufacturer's insistence that this curious steering wheel design was "avant garde and high-tec". In other respects the car was somewhat underdeveloped, and a number of design flaws plagued the early models, earning it the nickname of the 'All Aggro', which intensified over the next few years as well publicised stories about its build quality and reliability emerged. Most of these were fixed in the Allegro 2 edition of the car, launched in 1975, by which time a slightly smaller round steering wheel had quietly been substituted for the "quartic" original. Nevertheless, the car never quite managed to shake off its initial reputation.

In spite of all of this bad press, the Allegro was still a very popular car. As late as 1979, six years after its launch, it was the fifth-best-selling new car in Britain.

Sales in its final years were disappointing, and by 1981 it had fallen out of the top 10 as more buyers were choosing two newer BL products: the similar-sized and more viable Triumph Acclaim, and the smaller Austin Metro.

In his book Crap Cars, Richard Porter placed the Allegro second worst in his list, beaten only by the VW Beetle. Porter said "the only bit of the Allegro they got even vaguely right was the rust-proofing".

Despite this, the Allegro picked up a reputation for rust problems during its life. This was probably due to association with many other cars of the period (both from BL and other manufacturers) which had poor rust-proofing. An early edition of What Car? ran a feature on the then new Allegro, including an interview with staff at a BL dealership, who were asked if any problems occurred with the car in service. They replied that the car suffered from rust problems to its rear subframe. However, the staff thought they were being asked about the 1100/1300 car, which had been out of production for five years. Nonetheless, the magazine went on to report on the Allegro's non-existent rust problems, creating a serious image problem.

The poor reputation of the car and the inefficient production and management techniques in British Leyland at the time at which it was produced have meant that the Austin Allegro has become associated with waste, inefficiency and poor quality. In Clarkson's Car Years Jeremy Clarkson compares the Allegro to the Morris Marina, concluding that the Marina was in fact a worse car than the Allegro due to its relative lack of technical ambition and innovation. Clarkson noted that while the Allegro had initially been intended as a forward-looking design to compete with technically advanced European cars such as the Citroën GS, its development budget was only around half that of the much simpler Marina. In October 2004, while appearing on the British comedy panel game quiz show QI, Clarkson mused that the Austin Allegro was, "More aerodynamic going backwards". In 2007, Sir Digby Jones, in criticising the inefficiencies of the Learning and Skills Council, said, "It is what I call 'the British Leyland model' – you put a lot of money in at the top, and an Austin Allegro comes out at the bottom".

Quality problems concerning the Allegro led to British Leyland making the training video The Quality Connection, outlining both superficial and dangerous issues that can arise from a lack of care and attention.

== Legacy ==
The Allegro is generally considered amongst the most disreputable British Leyland models; some credibility was restored with its replacement the Maestro which was tipped as an adequate competitor to the Ford Escort, Vauxhall Astra and Volkswagen Golf. By the time of the Maestro's launch, a string of poor quality models throughout the 1970s had damaged the reputation of British Leyland and the Austin brand with the Maestro selling fewer models over a greater number of years (605,000 over 12 years to 642,000 Allegros over eight years). In 1987, the Austin name was phased out after 82 years in favour of the Rover name, which hadn't been tainted by some of the poorer products that had dented the reputation of the Austin brand.

In February 2006, it was reported that more than 1,000 Austin Allegros sold in the UK were still registered with the DVLA, a better survival rate than the more popular Morris Marina; most of which were dismantled for parts that were interchangeable with other British Leyland cars such as the MGB, Mini and Morris Minor. However, that figure had fallen to just 195 cars by February 2016 (excluding cars which were declared SORN), by 2023, that figure had fallen further to 36 cars still on the road in the UK. Part of this is down the Allegro's suitability (in A-Series engine format) as an engine donor for Mini restorations which is why many Allegros were broken solely for their power units.

== Engines ==
- 1973–1975: 1,098 cc (67.0 cu in) A-Series Straight-4, 49 hp (37 kW; 50 PS) at 5250 rpm and 60 lb⋅ft (81 N⋅m; 8 kg⋅m) at 2450 rpm
- 1975–1980: 1,098 cc (67.0 cu in) A-Series Straight-4, 45 hp (34 kW; 46 PS) at 5250 rpm and 55 lb⋅ft (75 N⋅m; 8 kg⋅m) at 2900 rpm
- 1973–1980: 1,275 cc (77.8 cu in) A-Series Straight-4, 59 hp (44 kW; 60 PS) at 5300 rpm and 69 lb⋅ft (94 N⋅m; 10 kg⋅m) at 3000 rpm
- 1980–1982: 998 cc (60.9 cu in) A-Plus Straight-4, 44 hp (33 kW; 45 PS) at 5250 rpm and 52 lb⋅ft (71 N⋅m; 7 kg⋅m) at 3000 rpm
- 1980–1982: 1,275 cc (77.8 cu in) A-Plus Straight-4, 62 hp (46 kW; 63 PS) at 5600 rpm and 72 lb⋅ft (98 N⋅m; 10 kg⋅m) at 3200 rpm
- 1973–1982: 1,485 cc (90.6 cu in) E-Series Straight-4, 69 hp (51 kW; 70 PS) at 5600 rpm and 83 lb⋅ft (113 N⋅m; 11 kg⋅m) at 3200 rpm
- 1973–1982: 1,748 cc (106.7 cu in) E-Series single carb Straight-4, 76 hp (57 kW; 77 PS) at 5000 rpm and 100 lb⋅ft (136 N⋅m; 14 kg⋅m) at 3100 rpm
- 1974–?: 1,748 cc (106.7 cu in) E-Series twin-carb Straight-4, 90 hp (67 kW; 91 PS) at 5500 rpm and 104 lb⋅ft (141 N⋅m; 14 kg⋅m) at 3100 rpm

== Advertising ==
The Allegro's launch slogan in 1973 was "The new driving force from Austin". In 1979, the Equipe and the Allegro 3 were sold under slogans based around the word "vroom".
