= Jean Parmentier (diplomat) =

French diplomat

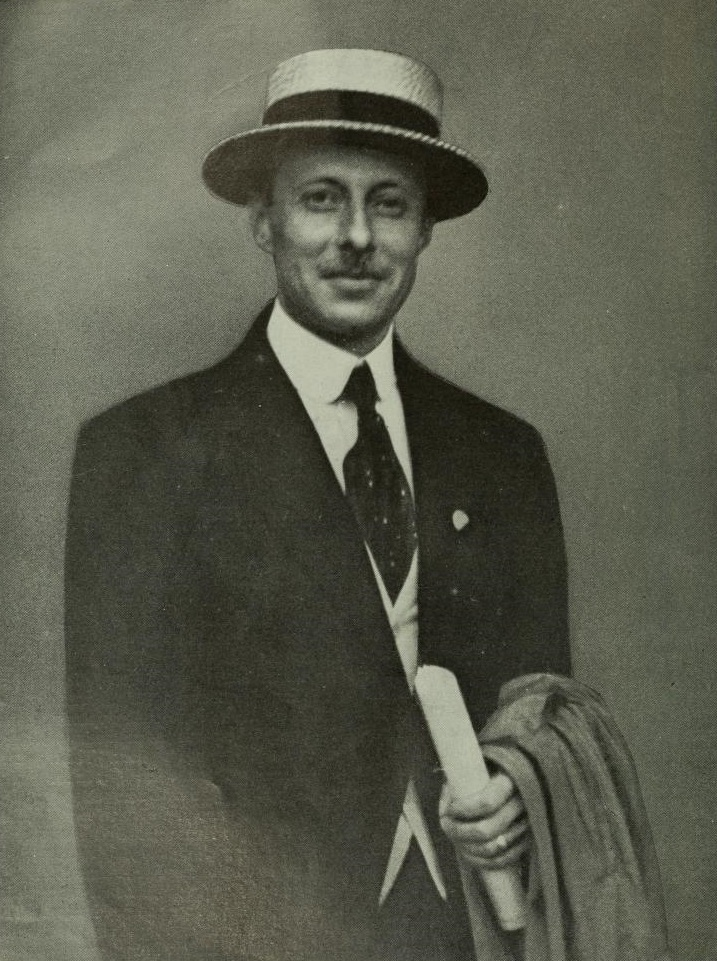
Jean Parmentier.

Jean Victor Guislain Parmentier (6 November 1883 – 22 June 1936) was a French diplomat.
