= Nueva Montaña Quijano =

Spanish steel company

Global Steel Wire S.A.
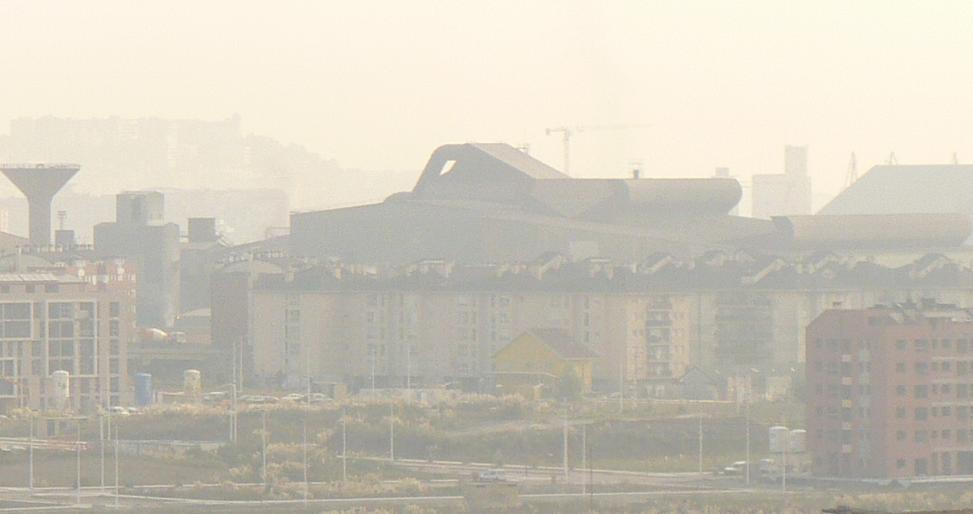
- The factory of Global Steel Wire S.A., as seen from Camargo
- Formerly: Nueva Montaña Quijano S.A.
- Industry: Steel manufacturing; Automotive manufacturing
- Predecessors: Altos Hornos de Nueva Montaña; Forjas de Buelna
- Headquarters: Santander, Spain
- Parent: CELSA Group
- Website: globalsteelwire.com

Nueva Montaña Quijano S.A. (Sometimes referred to as simply NMQ), now known as Global Steel Wire S.A., is a Spanish steel company based in Santander.

== Location ==
NMQ is located at C. la Peseta, 1D, in the Nueva Montaña, or "New Mountain" neighborhood of Santander, Cantabria, Spain.

== History ==
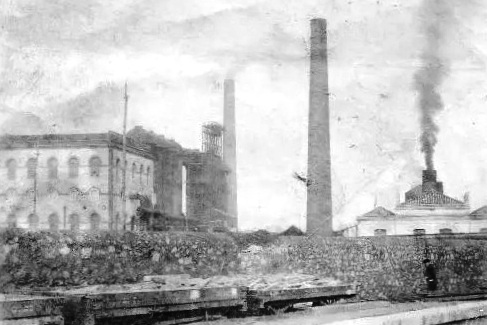
The factory of Altos Hornos de Nueva Montaña, one of the companies that merged to form Nueva Montaña Quijano, pictured around 1910.

The origins of the company can be traced back to 1873, when José Maria Quijano Fernández-Hontoria and Benigno Arce visited the 1873 Paris World's Fair and observed machinery for making steel nails. José set up a factory using this equipment in his family's flour mills. The company came to be known as Forjas de Buelna. In 1879, the company purchased machinery for making plate iron and drawing wire. The company was an early adopter of many technological advances. Electrical lighting was installed in 1880, as was a telephone line in 1881. In 1892, a Worker's Cooperative was set up, offering a pension and workers' compensation. In 1948, the company merged with Altos Hornos de Nueva Montaña to become Nueva Montaña Quijano S.A.. The company continued to expand, including buying other steel companies' mines and updating them with more modern equipment. In the mid-1950's, the company built the neighborhood of Grupo Santiago De Nueva Montaña Quijano, located in the municipality of Camargo, to house its workers. At one point, the company was taken over by the Spanish government, but it was privatized in 1985. In 1987, the company became part of the CELSA Group, under which the name was changed to Global Steel Wire, S.A. The company maintains its own cargo port and warehouses. The company formerly had its own narrow-gauge railway.

== Authi ==
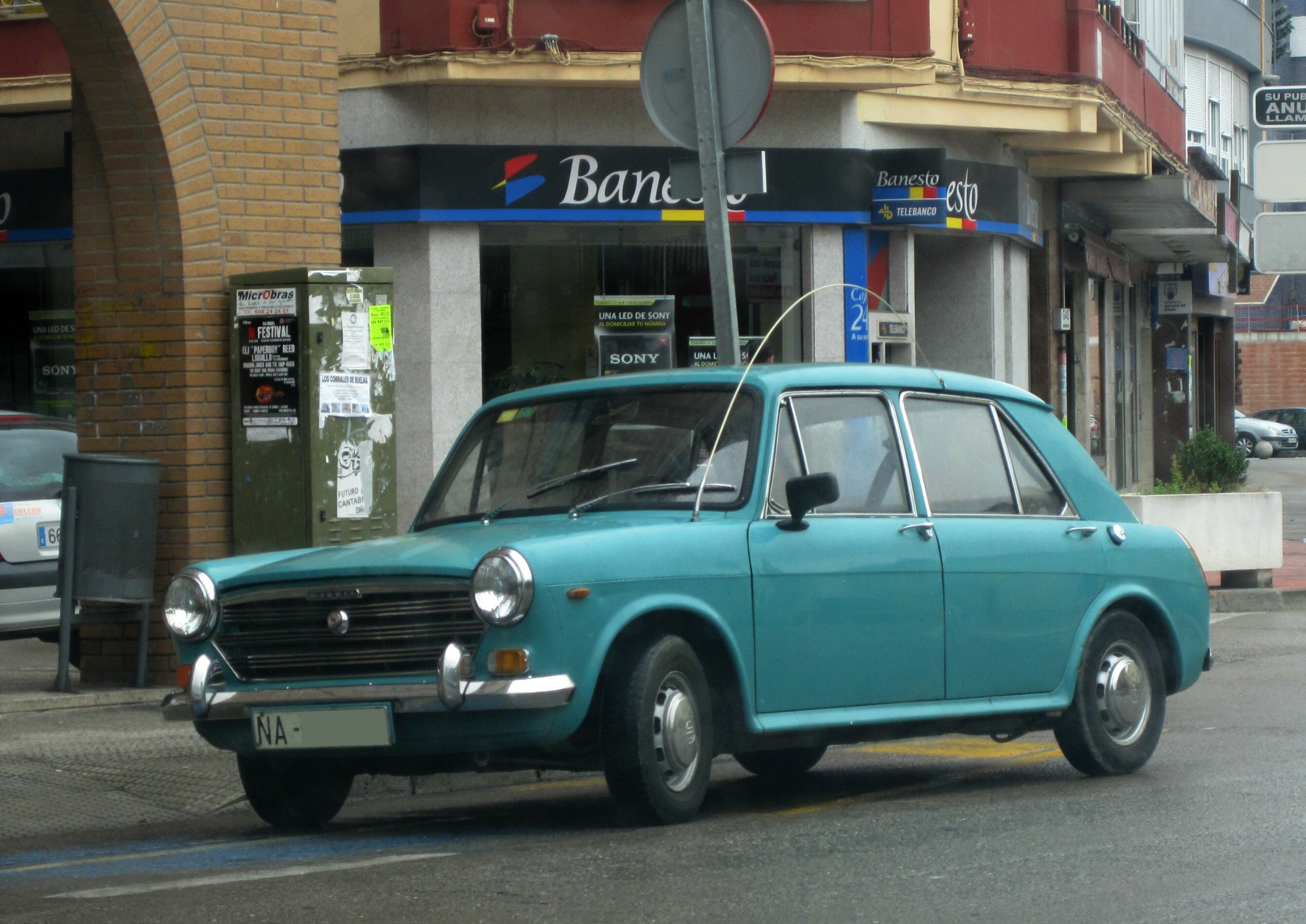
1971 Authi Morris 1100

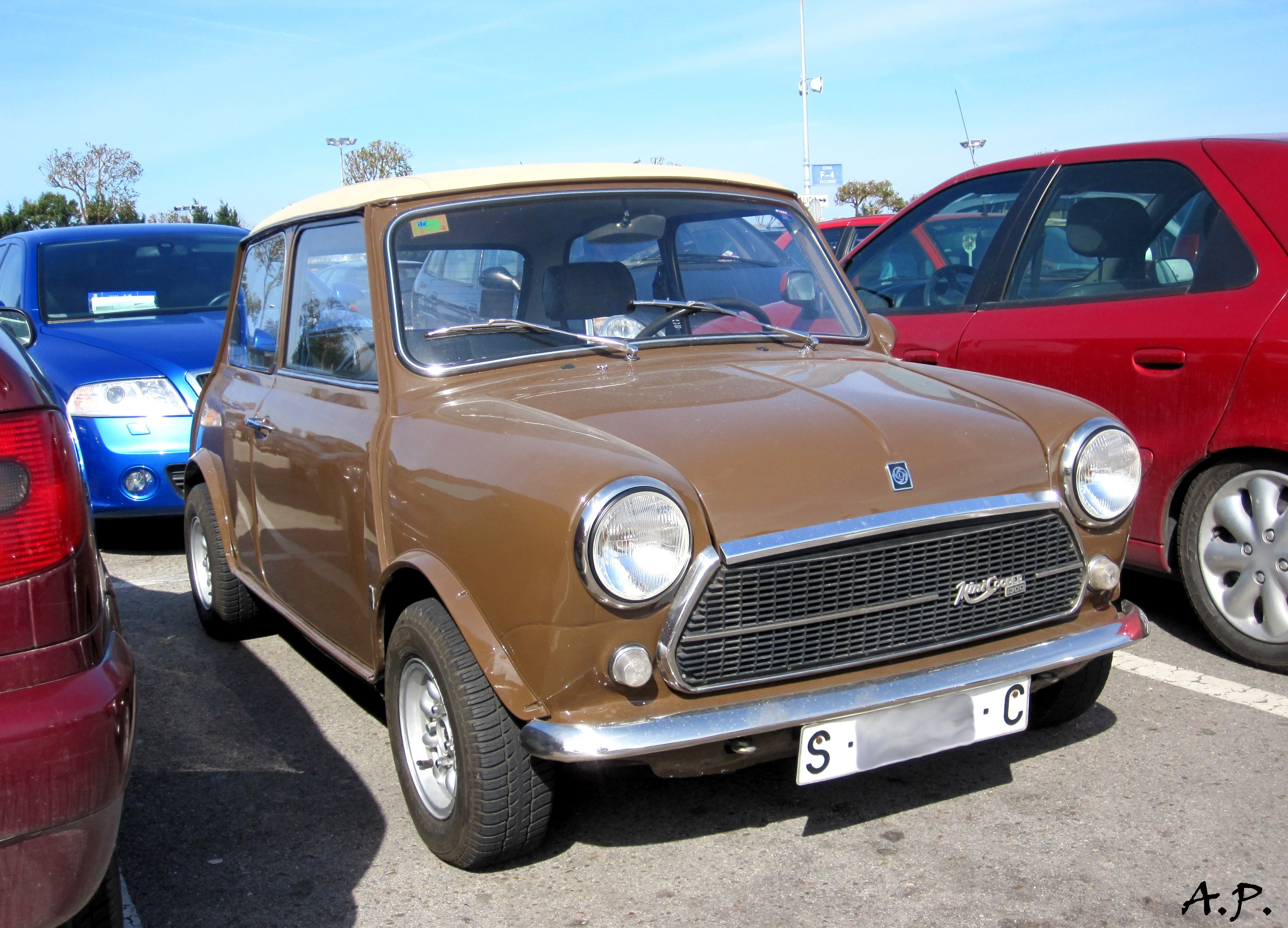
1974 Authi Mini 1300

During the mid-twentieth century, Spain had a semi-autarkic economic policy, so any products like cars and tractors had to be made in Spain, by Spanish companies, to avoid a luxury tax. However, many foreign companies found a way around this, by having a subsidiary headquartered in Spain, but often making products identical to their offerings in other countries.

One such company was Lanz Ibérica, the Spanish subsidiary of German tractor company Heinrich Lanz AG. In 1957, they commissioned NMQ to build engines for some of their tractors. After this proved to be a successful venture, NMQ also started producing parts for FASA-Renault. In 1961, the tractor business closed, and the contract with FASA-Renault was about to expire. Thus, the owners of NQM began to look for other opportunities. It found said opportunity in BMC. BMC had already produced some BMC S-66 trucks through the Spanish company SAVA, and was looking to expand. The company that resulted was called Automoviles de Turismo Hispano Ingleses, or Authi. Most models were identical to existing BMC models, and many model names were just the original model names with "Authi" Tacked to the front. For example, a Mini 1300 became the Authi Mini 1300. Authi production began in Autumn of 1966. In 1974, the Authi factory in Landaben caught on fire, which was a devastating blow to the company. This, along with a reputation for unreliability and BMC's declining fortunes led to Authi shutting down in 1976.
