= Lisvane Reservoir =

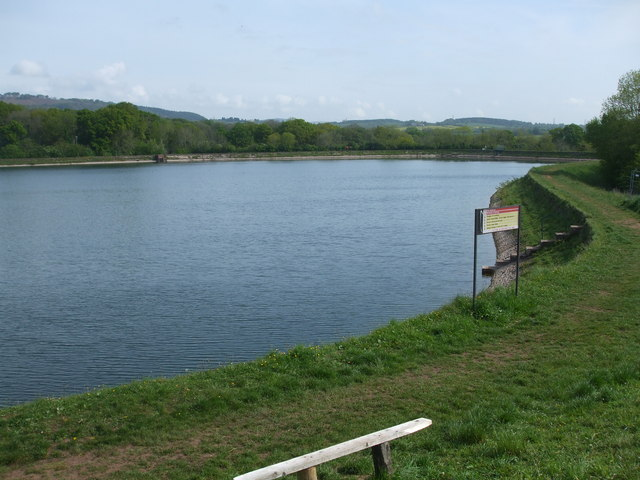
- Lisvane Reservoir

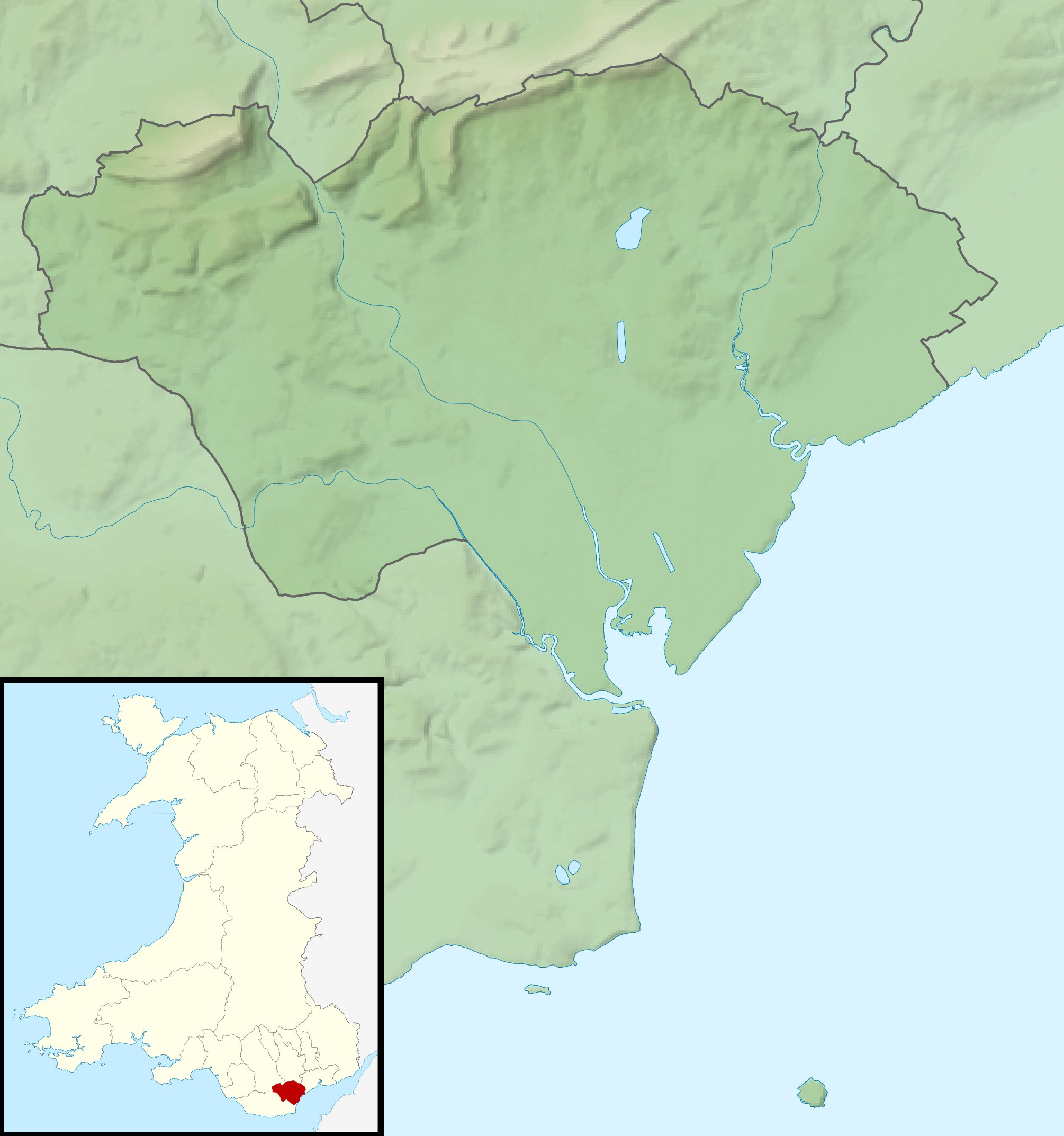
- Location within Cardiff
- Location: Lisvane, Cardiff, Wales
- Coordinates: 52.5322°N 3.1697°W
- Type: reservoir
- Basin countries: Wales, United Kingdom
- Built: 1886
- Max. length: 1,335 feet (407 m)
- Max. width: 650 feet (200 m)
- Settlements: Cardiff, Wales

Lisvane Reservoir at Lisvane, Cardiff, south Wales is one of several reservoirs constructed as part of the Taff Fawr scheme for supplying water to Cardiff, completed in 1886. It is adjacent to Llanishen Reservoir and forms part of the Nant Fawr Corridor from the top of Roath Park to the countryside beyond Cyncoed.

In 1892 the Llanishen Reservoir was reported to be able to hold 300,000,000 imperial gallons (1,400,000 m^{3}) of water and the smaller Lisvane Reservoir able to hold 80,000,000 imperial gallons (360,000 m^{3}).

On 30 August 2013, CELSA Group bought both Llanishen and Lisvane reservoirs from their owner Western Power Distribution, to assure its Cardiff rod mill plant a consistent supply of water.

In January 2016, Welsh Water acquired both Llanishen and Lisvane reservoirs from CELSA Group on a 999-year lease, which allows Welsh Water to use both reservoirs for water supply and recreational purposes while also allowing CELSA UK to continue to take its water supply from the Lisvane reservoir.

In July 2023, the Llanishen and Lisvane reservoirs were fully reopened to the public. Redevelopment works at the site included the construction of a two-storey visitor centre and restaurant, nature trails, and bird hides.

The reservoir is protected as a Site of Special Scientific Interest.

== See also ==
- List of Sites of Special Scientific Interest in Mid & South Glamorgan
