= Llanishen Reservoir =

Victorian reservoir in north Cardiff, Wales

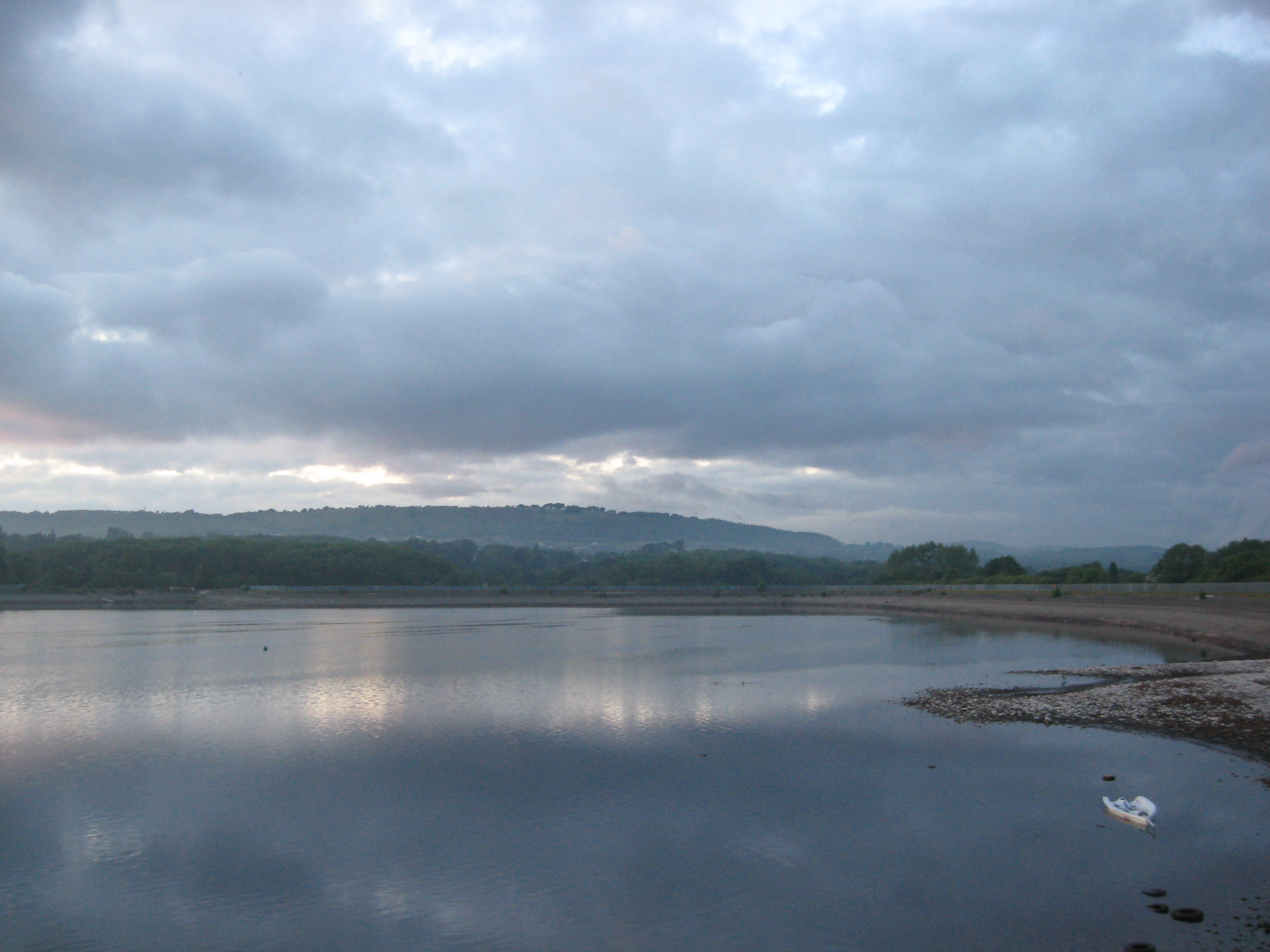
- Llanishen reservoir (semi-drained)

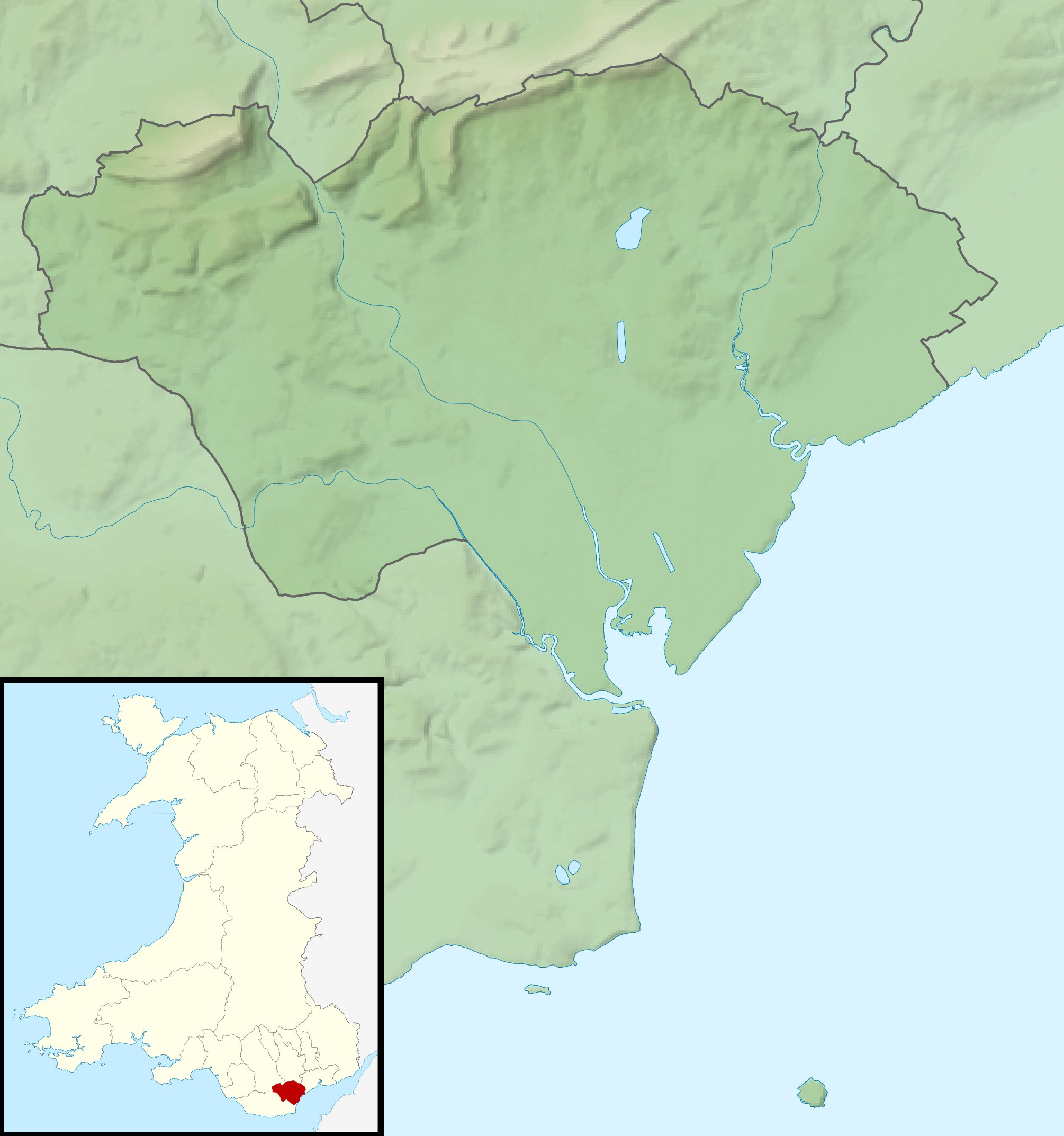
- Location within Cardiff
- Location: Llanishen, Cardiff, Wales
- Coordinates: 51°31′43″N 3°10′21″W
- Type: Reservoir
- Primary inflows: Rainfall
- Primary outflows: Drainage
- Basin countries: United Kingdom
- Built: 1886
- First flooded: 1886
- Surface area: 23.8 ha (59 acres)
- Max. depth: 9 m (30 ft)
- Water volume: 1,440,909 m^{3} (50,885,200 cu ft)
- Surface elevation: 45 m (148 ft)
- Frozen: Last frozen during Winter 09/10

Llanishen Reservoir (Welsh: Cronfa Ddŵr Llanisien) is a Victorian reservoir in north Cardiff, Wales. The reservoir is one of the reservoirs constructed as part of the Taff Fawr scheme for supplying water to Cardiff and was completed in 1886. It forms part of the Nant Fawr Corridor from the top of Roath Park to the countryside beyond Cyncoed.

The reservoir was used for water supply until the mid-1970s when it became redundant. It was then used for leisure activities and for 'topping up' the adjacent Lisvane Reservoir until it was drained completely. After buying Hyder plc, its new owner Western Power Distribution (WPD), proposed to redevelop the reservoir site, but after a series of objections from national governing bodies, the County Council, local residents and both local and national politicians this was blocked. On 30 August 2013, WPD sold both Llanishen and Lisvane reservoirs to CELSA Group.

In January 2016, Welsh Water acquired both Llanishen and Lisvane reservoirs from CELSA Group on a 999-year lease, which allows Welsh Water to use both reservoirs for water supply and recreational purposes while also allowing CELSA UK to continue to take its water supply from the Lisvane reservoir.

== History ==
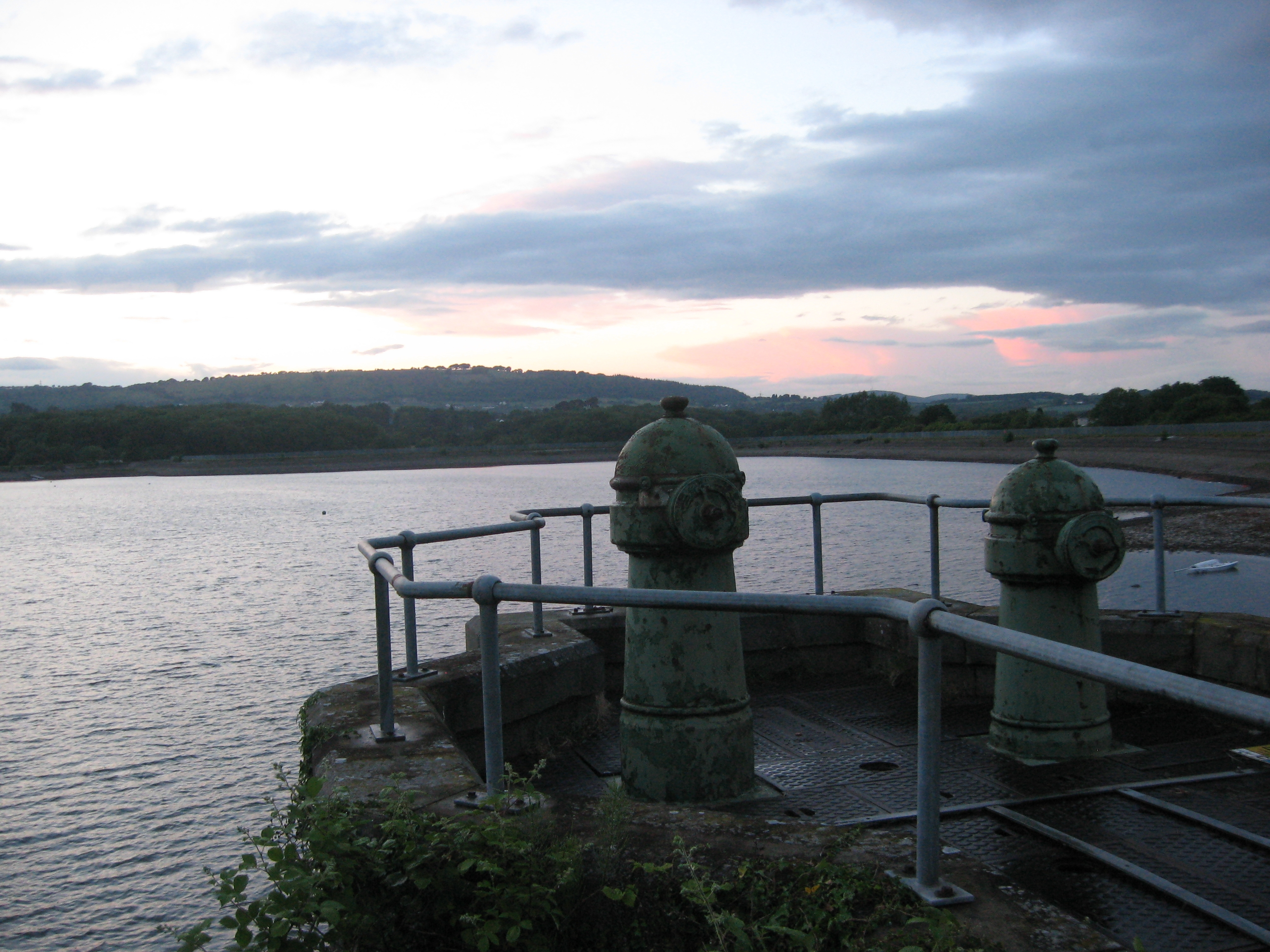
Many original features are still intact.

In 1881, Cardiff Corporation commissioned their Borough Engineer, John Avery Brandon Williams, to report on water resources within a reasonable distance of Cardiff. He presented his findings in May and August 1881, and concluded that reservoirs on the upper Taff Fawr, on the southern edge of the Brecon Beacons would be the best solution. He also recommended that the Llanishen Reservoir, which had been authorised by the Cardiff Waterworks Act 1878 (41 & 42 Vict. c. cxliv) obtained by the Cardiff Waterworks Company prior to Cardiff Corporation buying them out, should be constructed urgently. He also suggested that its capacity could be increased from 140 million imperial gallons (640 Ml) to 300 million imperial gallons (1,400 ML) without exceeding the limits of deviation specified in the act. The corporation were unsure how to proceed and sought the advice of the water engineer, John Frederick Bateman who agreed with Williams that the Taff Fawr scheme was the most promising solution which would fulfil the town's requirements at the least cost. They decided to build Llanishen Reservoir first, so that surplus water from the Lisvane catchment would not be lost, while the larger Taff Fawr project was under construction. The contract for the initial work was awarded to John Mackay in 1882 and completed in 1884, but it is unclear exactly what this involved, as soon afterwards, another contract for further work was awarded to Hill Brothers. They were unable to complete the work, due to financial difficulties arising from a sewerage contract at High Wycombe, and so T A Walker took over, completing the construction in 1886. Walker used a standard gauge railway to assist in the work, for three locomotives, an 0-6-0 saddle tank named Romilly and two 0-4-0 saddle tanks named Rhymney and Douglas are known to have worked on the site. All were manufactured by Hunslet Engine Company, and moved to the Manchester Ship Canal project afterwards.

The reservoir was built on flat land, surrounded on all sides by an earth-filled embankment with a clay core. There is no connection to local streams, such as the Nant Fawr, which runs around the edge of the reservoir, so it was initially filled by rainwater. However, 32 miles (51 km) of pipework, some 24 inches (610 mm) and some 29 inches (740 mm) in diameter, was installed to connect it to the reservoirs being built on the upper Taff Fawr, and once they were operational, Llanishen was fed with water from that source. It could then supply Cardiff with up to 12 million imperial gallons (55 Ml) of potable water per day. The embankment is some 10 metres (33 ft) high and about 1,173 metres (3,848 ft) long. The external embankment face is grassed whilst the internal face has stone pitching over the upper part and concrete over the lower part. It has a maximum surface area of water of 23.8 hectares (59 acres) and a capacity of 1,440,909 cubic metres (50,885,200 cu ft).

The reservoir is underlain by the St Maughan's Formation of the Lower Devonian age. Glacial till deposits of the Devonian age form part of the northern shore of the reservoir. The reservoir may be on the northern limb of the Cowbridge anticline.

In common with all the assets of Cardiff Corporation Waterworks, the reservoir was transferred to Welsh Water in 1973 when the Welsh Water Authority was formed, and it supplied water until the mid-1970s. In 1996 Welsh Water's holding company was renamed as Hyder plc and the group acquired South Wales Electricity plc. After Hyder's share price collapsed in 1999 and 2000, the Hyder Group was sold to WPD on terms recommended by the Hyder Board after a competitive and hostile takeover battle. WPD was an American-owned electricity distribution network operator for South West England, the Midlands and South and West Wales. In 2022 WPD was absorbed into its new parent company, National Grid.

Welsh Assembly members were concerned that the takeover would mean jobs being transferred to Bristol and Cheshire, and at its effect "on consumers' interests, on the environment, and on the wider economy".

WPD acquired the reservoir from Welsh Water in 2001 when Welsh Water was acquired by the not-for-profit organisation Glas Cymru: the reservoir was sold to a WPD subsidiary, Hyder Industrial Group Ltd, which was later renamed Western Power Distribution Investments Ltd.

The reservoir, which forms part of the Nant Fawr corridor, has been redundant since the 1970s and has only been used for leisure purposes and for 'topping up' the adjacent Lisvane Reservoir.

== Protection ==
The reservoir is listed as a Site of Importance for Nature Conservation (SINC) as it has pondweed and stonewort, and common toads breed there. The grassland and scrub surrounding the reservoir is also an SINC due to the grass snakes and slowworms there.

The banks of the reservoir are listed as a Site of Special Scientific Interest (SSSI) due to the diversity of waxcap fungi discovered growing on them. WPD appealed against this listing stating the Countryside Council for Wales's (CCW) decision was 'premature, arbitrary and unfair', but in January 2007 a High Court Judge upheld the SSSI designation and said it was 'an important site'.

The reservoir was also listed by Cadw in July 2009 as a building of special architectural or historic interest, despite an appeal from WPD against the listing.

== Leisure ==
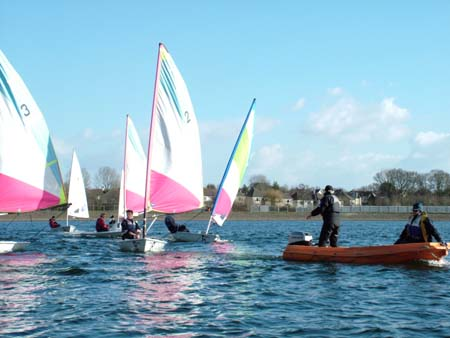
Sailing tuition taking place on Llanishen Reservoir

Until spring 2010 Llanishen Sailing Centre operated at the reservoir offering dinghy sailing, windsurfing, powerboating and canoeing courses. The centre, which is owned and managed by Cardiff County Council had been running at the reservoir for 30 years, though had to relocate to Cardiff Bay to continue operating due to the drain-down. where it became Cardiff Sailing Centre.

The centre has gained national recognition as both a 'grass-roots' training centre through the RYA's OnBoard scheme and as a first class race training centre and club. The centre has also produced National and International class sailors over the years.

The reservoir was also once popular with anglers (through the Cardiff Fly Fishing Club), picnickers, birdwatchers and walkers. Fishing at the reservoir stopped in 1998 and many of the other activities have been curtailed since 2004 due to the security fence that was constructed around the banks of the reservoir and (less securely) to the site boundary.

Many people still walk between the 'inner' and 'outer' fences, due to a number of natural and man-made gaps in the outer fence and the natural hedges. Although the site is monitored, only some of the 'gaps' are resecured.

== Proposed housing redevelopment ==
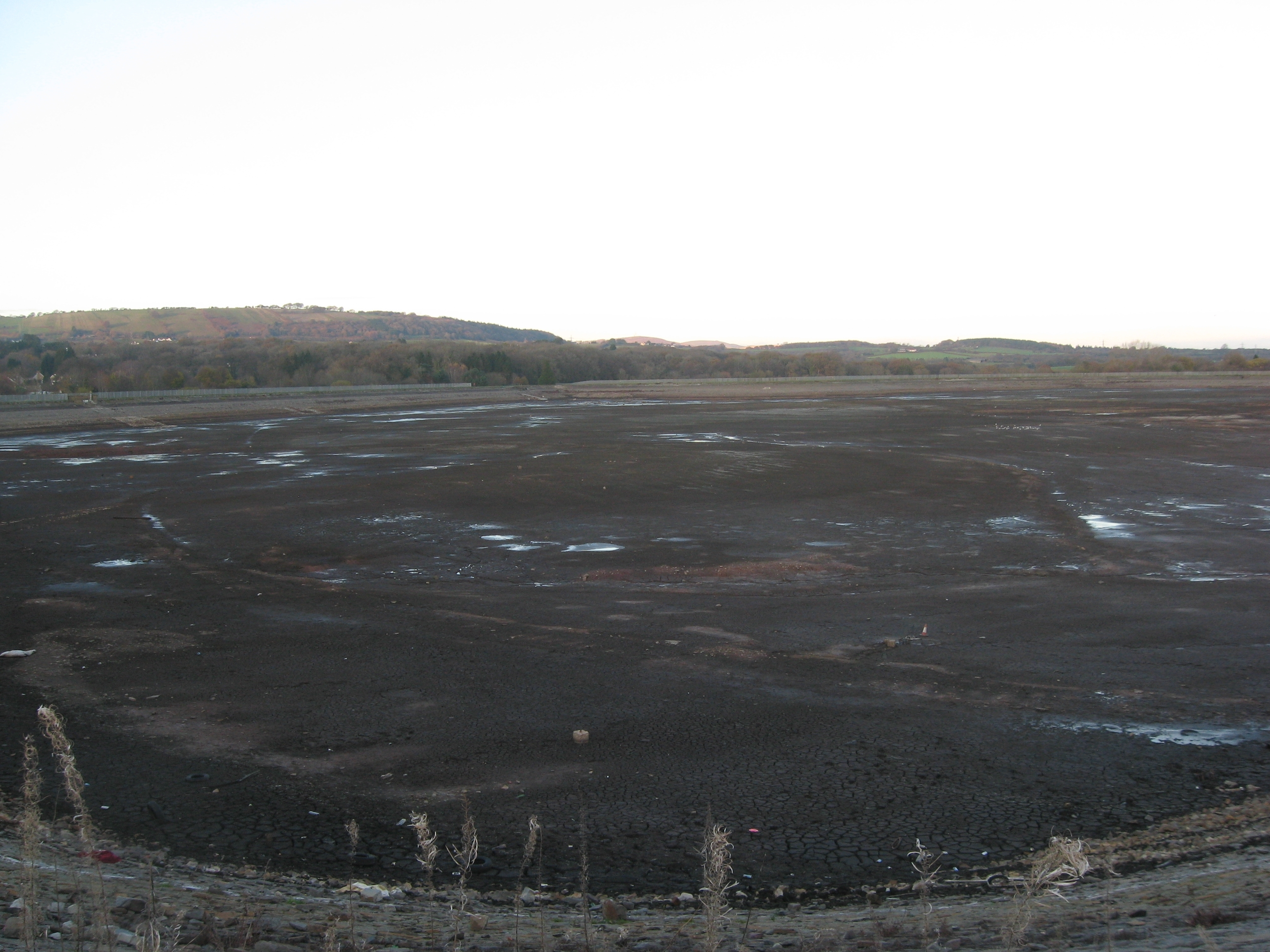
The reservoir, which was drained in 2010.

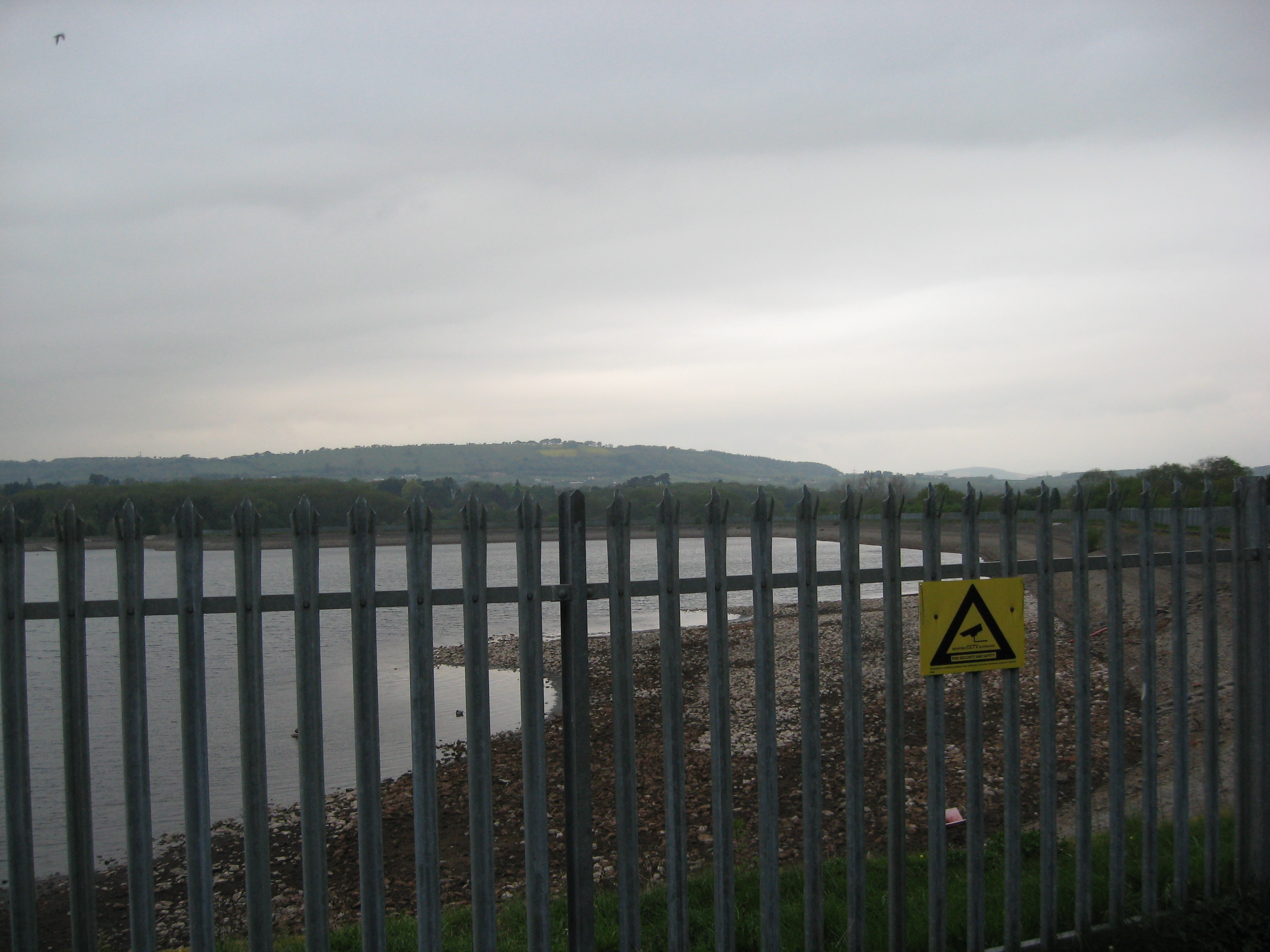
The inner surrounding fence, with surveillance sign.

WPD have proposed redevelopment since 2002. The latest proposal is for 300 new homes, surrounding a much reduced water area, and a connected 'wetland area', as well as a new sailing club and wildlife and education centre. This proposal was recommended by the Planning Inspector, but rejected by the Environment Minister. WPD requested a judicial review of the decision and the minister withdrew her defence after considering WPD's submission. The Court referred the decision back to the minister and a decision is awaited.

In March 2010, work started to drain the legal limit of 3 metres (9.8 ft) of water from the reservoir into the nearby Nant Fawr stream. WPD say that the drain-down is required as a result of a statutory inspection carried out by WS Atkins PLC. But the Environment Agency have disagreed. The drainage is opposed by opponents of the redevelopment, who claim that the reservoir will take 8 years to refill if totally emptied.

The public inquiry considered the requirement for drain-down and the ecological effects in detail. On the drain-down the Planning Inspector concluded that opponents' suspicions had been "fully rebutted". And after considering a lot of evidence the Inspector concluded that CCW were content for development to proceed and that "significant ecological benefits would result from the development".

In May 2010, WPD applied to the Environment Agency for a discharge licence in order to completely drain the reservoir, which was granted in July 2010. The issue was taken to UK Parliament by Jonathan Evans where he stated that an independent report by the Halcrow Group (advising for the Environment Agency) explained that draining the reservoir could create 'new risks to reservoir safety'. Evans' predecessor, Julie Morgan, had previously taken the issue of saving the reservoir site to parliament, and had garnered support from politicians such as Peter Hain (the Welsh Secretary) and Ed Miliband (later leader of the Labour Party), who visited the site during the May 2010 general election campaign, commenting on the site's tranquillity.

In March 2011, WPD applied to Cardiff County Council for planning permission for a miniroundabout on Lisvane Road and listed building consent to alter the structure of the reservoir. Both of these were called in by the Welsh Government. During the appeal a number of changes to the original appeal were submitted by WPD and accepted by all parties. The appeal was heard during the Summer of 2011.

On 25 April 2013, The Welsh Government refused the planning appeal from WPD which was for 324 homes.

== Visitor Centre development ==
On 30 August 2013, CELSA Group bought both Llanishen and Lisvane reservoirs from their owner Western Power Distribution, to assure its Cardiff rod mill plant a consistent supply of water from Lisvane.

In January 2016, Welsh Water acquired both Llanishen and Lisvane reservoirs from CELSA Group on a 999-year lease. The campaign against development of the site led by the Reservoir Action Group welcomed the move and hoped that the site could be reopened to the public in future.

In July 2023, the Llanishen and Lisvane reservoirs were fully reopened to the public. In tandem with refilling of the reservoir, redevelopment works at the site included the construction of a two-storey visitor centre and restaurant, nature trails, and bird hides.
