= Authi =

Spanish automobile manufacturer

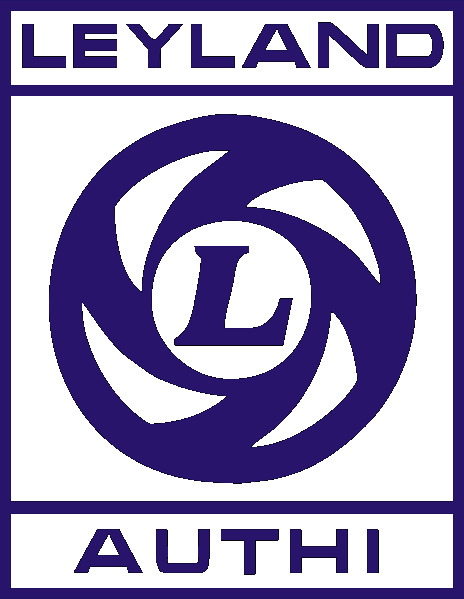
- Type: Subsidiary
- Industry: Automotive industry
- Founded: 1965
- Defunct: 1976; 50 years ago
- Products: Automobiles
- Owner: British Leyland; Nueva Montaña Quijano
- Parent: BMC (1965–1968); British Leyland (1968–1976)

Authi was a car manufacturer based in Pamplona, Spain. It was founded in 1965 as a result of a collaboration between BMC (the British Motor Corporation) and NMQ (Nueva Montaña Quijano).

BMC needed a way to sell their cars in Spain, which at the time had strict rules to protect local automobile manufacturers from imported competitors and to protect local companies from foreign takeover. Thus, Authi built almost identical copies of a range of Austin and Morris cars. The company survived only until 1976 when British Leyland ran out of money and the almost new Authi plant was sold to the SEAT car company after the failure of a bid for it from General Motors.

== Name ==
The company's name stands for Automoviles de Turismo Hispano Ingleses; it is generally written and spoken as a word rather than as an acronym.

== Beginnings ==
The Authi firm was officially registered on 12 November 1965 under the chairmanship of Eduardo Ruiz de Huidrobo y Alzurena, with its head office and premises at Arazuri, a few kilometers to the west of Pamplona. The share capital was held by a Santander metal working business called Nueva Montaña Quijano S.A. (NMQ) which had originally been founded in 1948. The real owners of the business were the Banco de Santander and the Quijano family. The bank also had a controlling interest in Fasa Renault which had been building Renaults at their Valladolid plant for the Spanish market since 1951. NMQ had been supplying engines for the Spanish-built Renaults. Work dried up when Renault moved their engine production in-house. Therefore, BMC's search for a Spanish partner able to build their cars for the Spanish market in Spain had coincided with NMQ's search for another automotive partner able to provide designs that could be produced locally.

The first Spanish-built Authi product, an MG 1100, emerged in January 1967. A Mini C 1275 followed in October, featuring leather seats and a walnut dashboard, along with various other pieces of additional equipment not featured by Minis produced in England.

== BLMC takes a controlling share ==
It was announced in July 1967 by BLMC Chairman, Lord Stokes that his company had taken a controlling 51% share in NMQ. There was a further capital injection by Leyland in 1973 which raised the share capital to 2,400 million pesetas and left the residual minority share holders with very little influence over the business. In this year, presidency of the company passed to Manuel Diez Alegria. Highlighted at the time was the company's new spare parts centre, featuring a state-of-the-art computer inventory control system, employing punch-cards.

== Success and the Mini ==
Volume production started with the opening of the Pamplona plant in 1969. In April of that year, two versions of the Mini 1000 came to the market, respectively Standard and Special (Standard y Especial): even the standard version was seen as relatively well equipped at the time. The Mini would achieve the highest sales volumes of any model in the short history of Authi, with more than 140,000 shipped by the time the plant closed down seven years later. The car was entirely assembled at Pamplona. The bodywork and under panels were delivered from England. The engine and the gear box were manufactured at NMQ's own plant at Los Corrales de Buelna. Other parts including axle, suspension, windows and smaller components were produced locally and in Barcelona in order to comply with the government's determinedly protectionist trade policies.

== Milking the Mini brand ==
In January 1970, a Mini 850 was added to the range, featuring virtually the same engine that had been fitted in the original English-built Mini in 1959. A reduced specification Mini 1000 followed. This broadened the appeal of the range in the still acutely price-sensitive Spanish auto-market, but it also dragged the Authi brand down-market which would compromise the company's future ability to price its cars at a premium against competitor Fiat and Renault designed products.

By this time the company's reputation was beginning to suffer the effects of inadequate investment in the dealership network. After-sales service suffered because the cars, in some ways more sophisticated than the old models offered by SEAT and Renault, were often not sufficiently understood by workshop personnel at the Authi dealers.

In 1971 the company introduced the Mini 1275 GT, its specification closely matched to the corresponding English-built car. This replaced the company's first model, the Mini C 1275. The leather seats and walnut dashboard of the old model disappeared. The 1275 GT was, however, more aggressively priced than its predecessor.

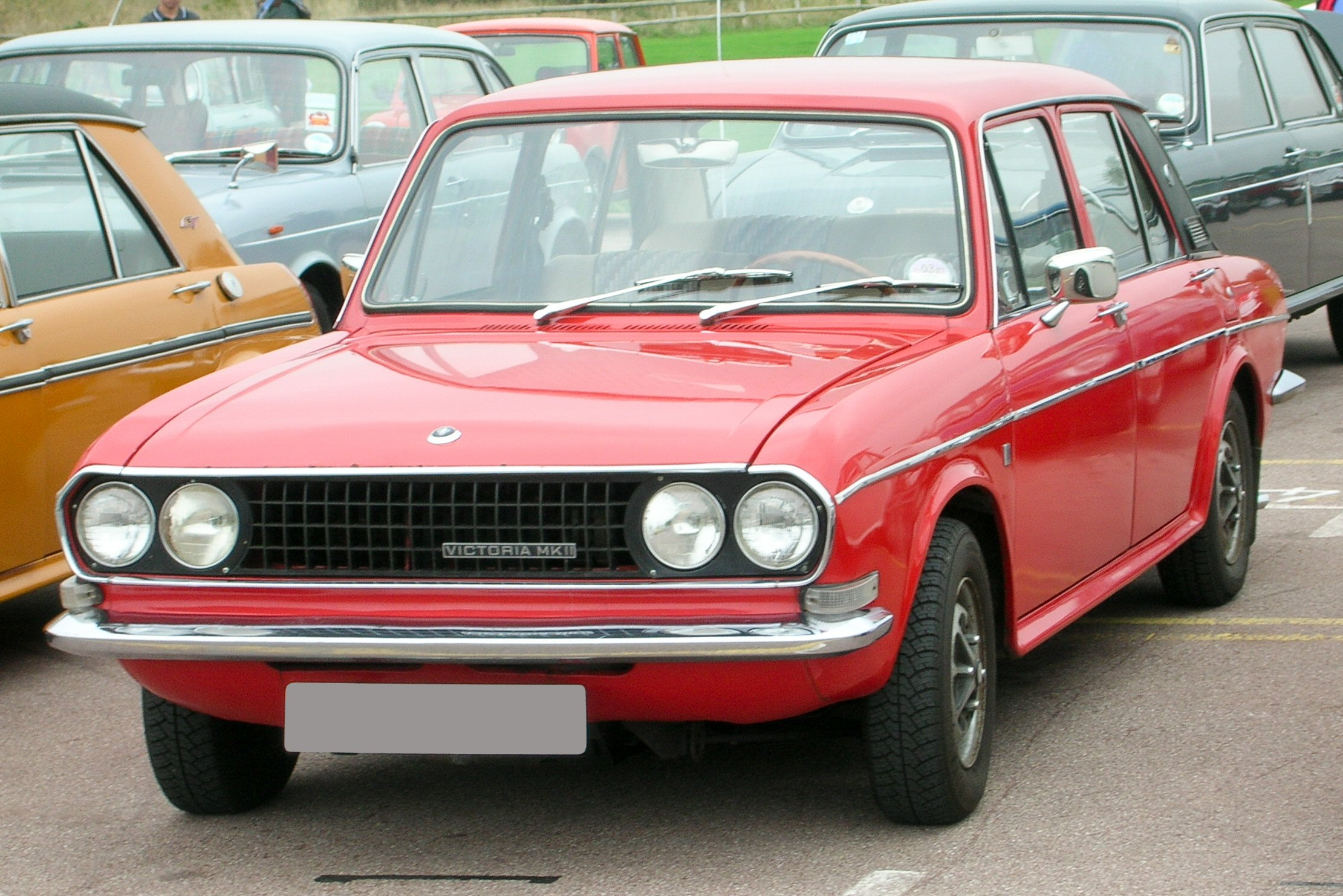
1973 Austin Victoria MKII De Luxe

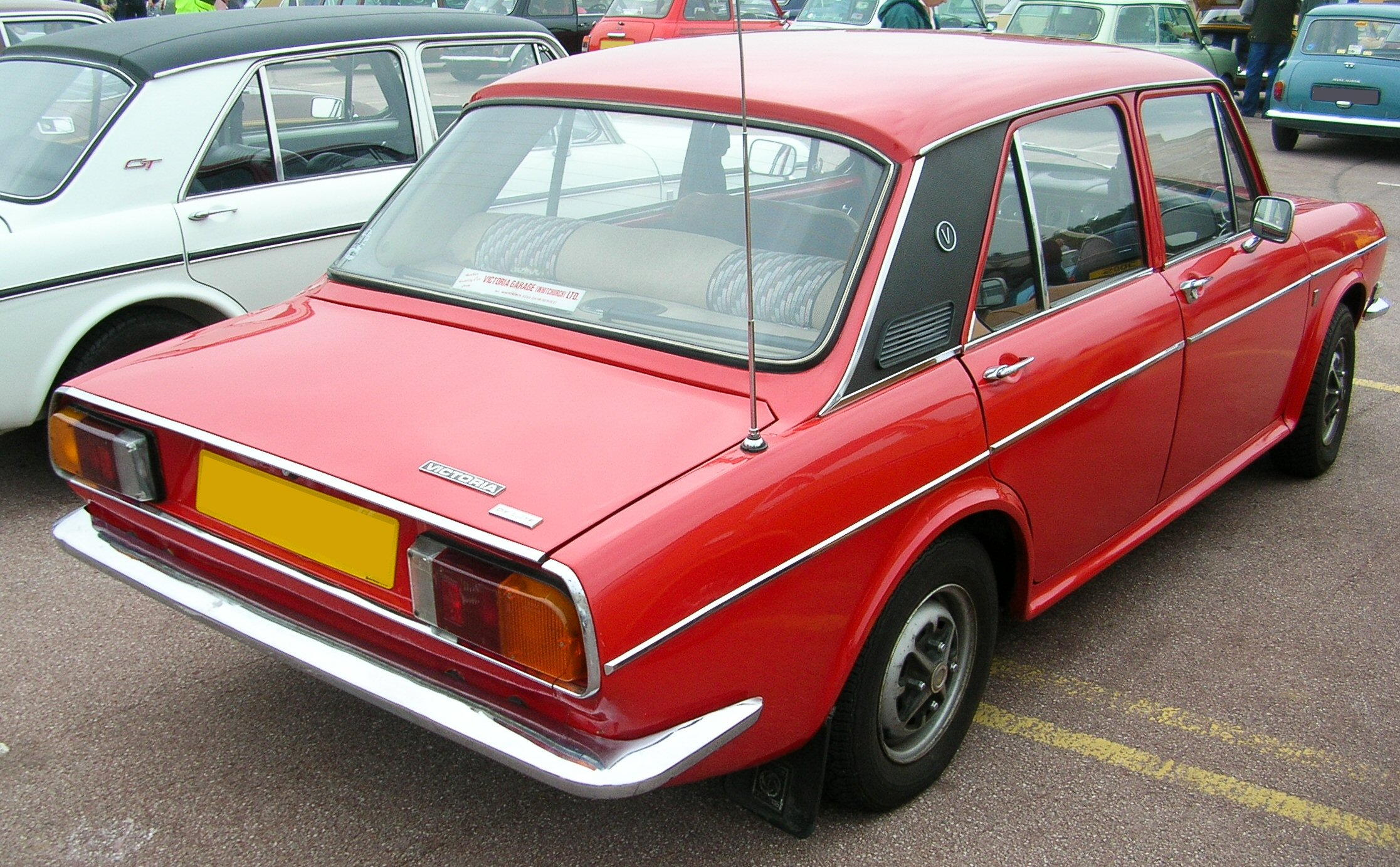
1973 Austin Victoria MKII De Luxe rear view

== Production ==
The following cars were built by Authi:

- Authi Mini (1968–1975)
- Authi Mini Cooper (1973–1975)
- Morris 1100/1300 (1966–1972)
- Austin Victoria - Austin Victoria De Luxe (1972–1975)
- Austin de Luxe (1974–1975)

== Production figures ==
Year	1966	1967	1968	1969	1970	1971	1972	1973	1974	1975
Total annual production	27	14,645	21,020	15,789	18,570	31,401	34,199	43,318	30,763	15,121

== Life after disposal by bankrupt Leyland ==
After BLMC closed down production of their models and the sale of the plant to SEAT, the Spanish automaker built the SEAT 124, SEAT 131, SEAT Panda and Lancia Beta at the former Authi factory. General Motors had been interested in buying the Authi production facility in 1974, but these talks collapsed, and the company set about building its own factory in the country, finally opening a plant at Zaragoza in 1982.

== Future ==
In 2010, all the rights were bought by Pedro J. Santos, Tauro founder.

== Other Spanish manufacturers ==
- Barreiros
- GTA Spano
- Hurtan
- IFR Aspid
- SEAT
- Sunred
- Tauro Sport Auto
- Tramontana
- Urovesa
- Biscúter
