= Project Birch =

Project Birch is the British government's bailout plan to help save companies that are critical to the British economy during the COVID-19 pandemic. It was announced in May 2020. As of September 2020, only one company has qualified for help.

== Description ==
The Treasury said that support would be given to "viable companies which have exhausted all options", whose failure would "disproportionately harm the economy". It aims to step in to support sectors of the economy most affected by the pandemic and to reduce job losses, but will only assist companies as a "last resort". Whilst the scheme was more likely to involve loans, it was also discussed as including stakes being bought in companies, though the Chancellor of the Exchequer, Rishi Sunak, was understood to be reticent about this. He said instead that companies would be required to make formal pledges related to executive compensation, employment, greenhouse gases and tax.

== History ==
There were financial schemes and packages announced by the government to support companies, such as the Coronavirus Job Retention Scheme and the Bounce Back Loan Scheme, but concerns were raised that large businesses would remain in difficulty after using options already in place.

Car manufacturers including Aston Martin and Jaguar Land Rover looked into government funding, with the latter in talks for a potential £1 billion loan. Taxpayers may potentially have held stakes in the company as a result of the discussions, before the Financial Times reported that the talks with the company had ended. They also reported that talks with Tata Steel had ended; the steelmaking company's UK business had asked for £500 million in government support.

The airline Virgin Atlantic asked for the government to provide it with a £500 million emergency loan, saying it was planning to cut 3,000 jobs, and the Scottish-based regional airline Loganair also asked for help.

The first, and so far only, company to receive a loan through the scheme was Celsa Steel UK, which was provided with a £30 million bailout. The company, which is the UK's largest steel rebar manufacturer, was given a series of legally-binding conditions to adhere to, and told that the money was to be repaid in full.

== Response ==
The Shadow Chancellor of the Exchequer, Anneliese Dodds, said that the support should focus on maintaining employment, and that companies receiving support should be "prevented from engaging in share buybacks and dividend payments".

The importance of support for key businesses was commented on by the Institute of Directors' chief economist who warned of the knock-on effect that key business failures could have on the supply chain.

Unite the Union welcomed the news of the scheme and said that it could prevent "a tsunami of job losses" from affecting communities.

By September 2020, only one company had been helped by the scheme, which led the Shadow Secretary of State for Business, Energy and Industrial Strategy, Ed Miliband, to ask the government for clarifications about the scheme's progress. His colleague Dodds said of the companies seeking help, "The longer it takes to get it, the higher the risk to jobs and businesses that the government itself admits are too important to fail".

== Foreign government support ==
Outside the United Kingdom, financial support schemes have been carried out by other governments. The largest German airline, Lufthansa, said on 29 June that it would receive a £8.1 billion bailout from the German government. As well as this, the French government presented loans and loan guarantees worth £6.31 billion to Air France–KLM.

== See also ==
- Economic impact of the COVID-19 pandemic in the United Kingdom
- Operation Kingfisher, a government plan to support companies over the Brexit transition period
