= Austin de Luxe =

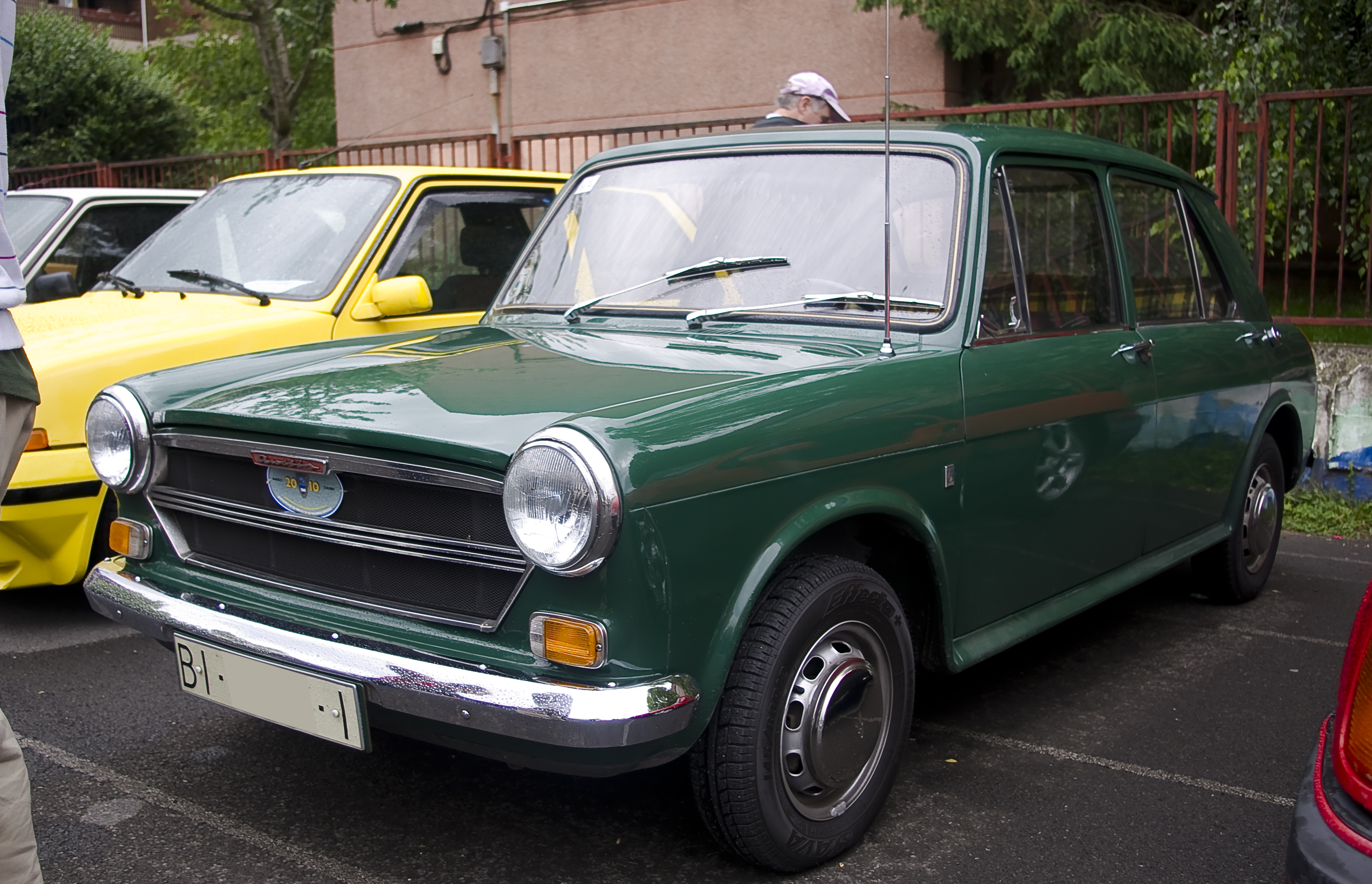
- 1975 Austin de Luxe

Overview
- Manufacturer: Authi (British Leyland)
- Production: 1974–1975
- Assembly: Spain: Pamplona
- Designer: Pininfarina /Alec Issigonis

Body and chassis
- Class: Mid-size
- Body style: 4-door saloon
- Layout: Front-engine, front-wheel-drive
- Related: BMC ADO16

Powertrain
- Engine: 55 hp (41 kW) 998 cc BMC A-Series

The Austin de Luxe is a family car that was produced by Authi at its Pamplona plant between 1974 and 1975.

The car was styled by Pininfarina, based on the chassis and various other components of the Austin/Morris 1100. It was powered by a 55 hp (41 kW) 998 cc BMC A-Series engine identical to the 998 Mini Cooper with the exception of having only one SU carburetor.
