= CELSA Group =

Multinational group of steel companies

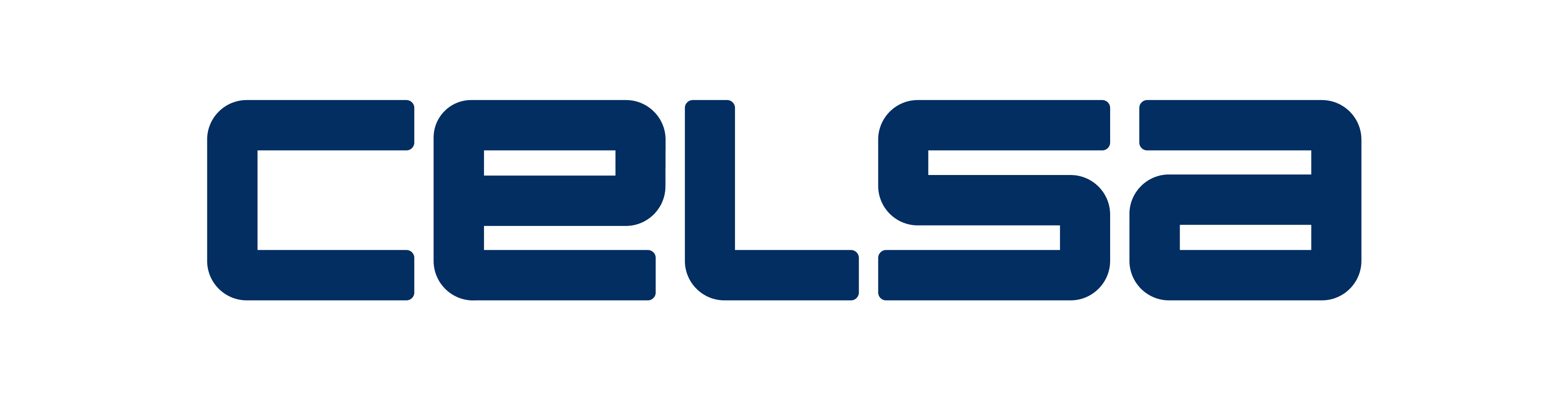
- Formerly: Compañía Española de Laminación
- Industry: Steel manufacture
- Founded: 1967; 59 years ago
- Headquarters: Castellbisbal, Spain
- Subsidiaries: 8 European steel companies

CELSA Group is a multinational group of steel companies headquartered in Spain, mainly in the industry of steel reinforcement or rebar.

== History ==
It was formed in 1967 as the Compañía Española de Laminación. Competitors of the company include Salzgitter AG, of Salzgitter in Germany.

See history of Celsa Group since 1967.

== Structure ==
It is headquartered in Castellbisbal in Spain. It is composed of eight main steel companies, across Europe.

=== Celsa Steel UK ===
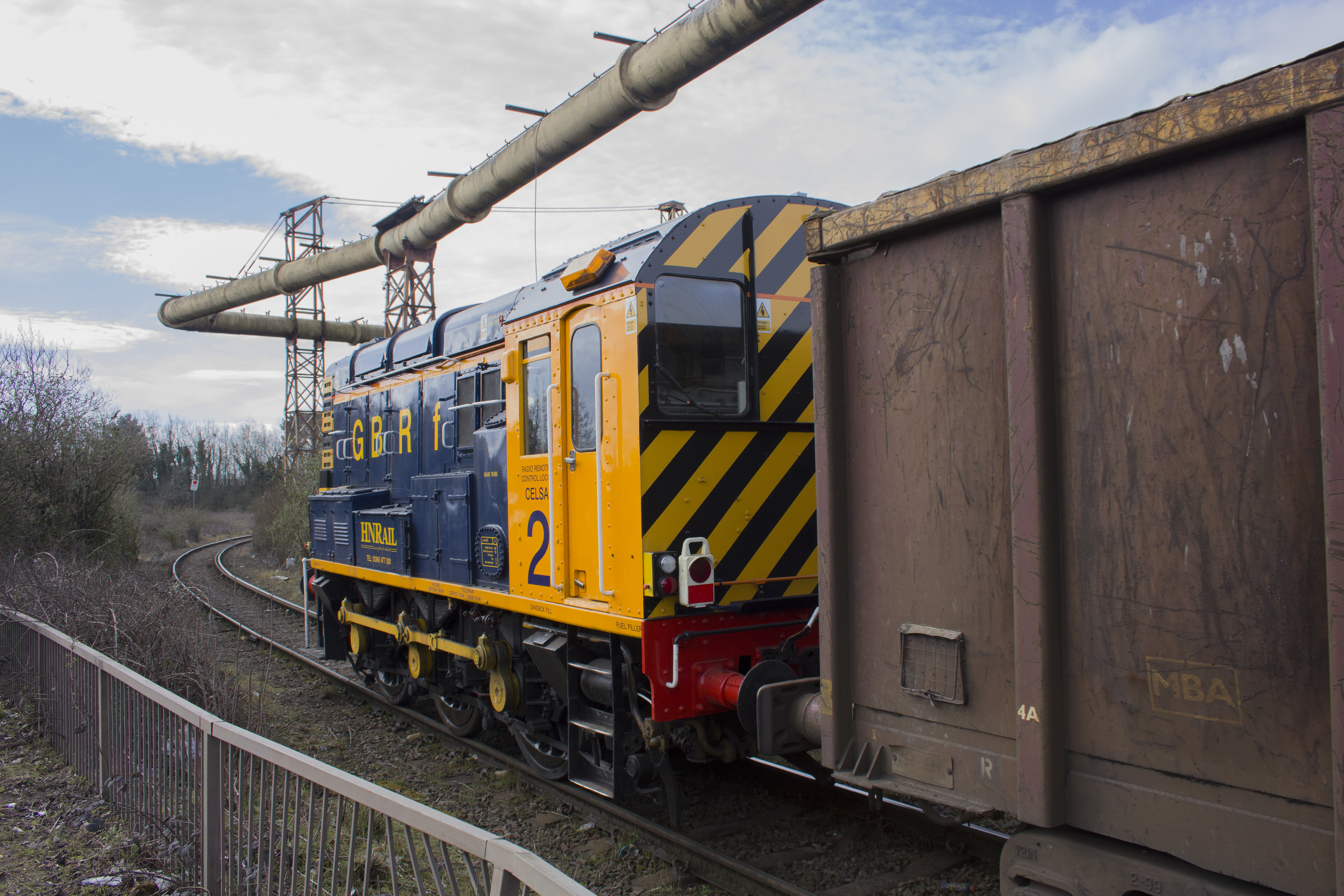
GB Railfreight No.08924/Celsa No.2 shunts steel wagons at Celsa Steel UK, Cardiff.

Celsa Steel UK is in Cardiff, and is the UK's largest manufacturer of steel reinforcement products. In November 2015, two people died at its Cardiff manufacturing site on East Moors Road.

During the COVID-19 pandemic, the UK government provided Celsa Steel UK with a £30 million bailout to help it continue trading providing it met a set of conditions. This made it the first company to receive a loan through the government's financial support scheme known as Project Birch.

Since 2010, the plant has used GB Railfreight for freight services. This includes both incoming supply of scrap steel, outgoing finished products, as well as on-site shunting services using remotely-controlled British Rail Class 08 locomotives, supplemented by sub-contract locomotive supply from Harry Needle Railroad Company.

== See also ==
- Community (trade union)
- Ferrous metal recycling
