= British International Motor Show =

Annual automotive show held between 1903 and 2019

- Status: Annual to 1976 then Bi-annual
- Genre: Motor show
- Venue: The Crystal Palace (1903); Olympia London (1905–1936); Earls Court Exhibition Centre (1937–1976); National Exhibition Centre (1978–2004); ExCeL London (2006–2008)
- Location: England
- Country: England
- Inaugurated: 1903
- Most recent: 2019
- Next event: London International Motor Show 26–28 February 2027
- Website: londonmotorshow.com

The British International Motor Show was an annual (bi-biennial after 1976) motor show held by the Society of Motor Manufacturers and Traders (SMMT) between 1903 and 2008 in England. The show was relaunched in 2016 and ran until 2019. The event will return on 26–28 February 2027 at Excel, London.

== History ==
Britain's first motor show—for horseless carriages—was held in South Kensington in 1896 at the Imperial Institute under the auspices of Lawson's Motor Car Club.

The first British Motor Show organised by the Society of Motor Manufacturers and Traders (SMMT) was held at The Crystal Palace, London in 1903, the same year that the speed limit was raised from 14 miles per hour (23 km/h) to 20 miles per hour (32 km/h) by the Motor Car Act 1903 and two years before the formation of The AA.

In 1905, it moved to Olympia London where it was held for the next 32 years before moving to the Earls Court Exhibition Centre from 1937 until 1976, except for the period of World War II during which time there were no shows.

Initially held in London at The Crystal Palace, Olympia London and then the Earls Court Exhibition Centre, it moved to the National Exhibition Centre in Birmingham in 1978, where it stayed until 2004. The International motorshow alternated with the London Motorfair which continued in Earl's Court from 1977 to 1999

The SMMT announced in 1975 that in future that the show would alternate locations with Birmingham and from 1978 until 2004, it was held every second year at the National Exhibition Centre (NEC), Birmingham, with the 2004 event being held in May, rather than the traditional October, to avoid a clash with the Paris Motor Show.

The July 2006 and July 2008 shows were held at ExCeL London.

The motorshow was held at ExCeL London in 2006 and 2008. The 2010 and 2012 events were cancelled due to the Great Recession, and there was no 2014 show. The last British International Motor Show in the UK was 2008, and after the 2012 cancellation, ended the involvement of the SMMT. The 2010 and 2012 shows were cancelled due to the Great Recession.

With the absence of an international show in England, between 2016 and 2019, there were annual motor shows held under the London Motor Show banner held in Battersea Park for the first two years and moved to Excel for 2019. The 2020 show was cancelled due to the COVID-19 pandemic.

The event will return on 26–28 February 2027 at Excel, London under the banner London International Motor Show The London International Motor Show (LIMS) is an automotive and mobility exhibition held at ExCeL London, in the Royal Docks, London. The inaugural edition is scheduled to take place from 26 to 28 February 2027.

== Background ==
London has hosted major motor shows since the early twentieth century, most notably the British International Motor Show, which ran under various names from 1903 until 2008, and later the London Motor Show, which operated from 2016 to 2019 before being cancelled due to the COVID-19 pandemic.

The London International Motor Show represents the return of a major international automotive showcase to the capital, some eight years after the final London Motor Show in 2019.

== Venue ==
The show takes place at ExCeL London, situated in the Royal Docks area of east London, close to London City Airport and with direct transport links to central London. The venue's international connectivity is considered central to attracting global exhibitors, media, and visitors.

== Format and content ==
The 2027 show is designed to combine elements of a traditional motor show with modern, interactive features. Visitors will have the opportunity to view production cars and concept models from major manufacturers, attend live demonstrations, and book test drives.

A central theme of the inaugural edition is the automotive industry's shift from internal combustion engines towards electrified powertrains, with exhibitors showcasing hybrid, plug-in hybrid, and battery-electric models alongside innovations in software, connectivity, and mobility services.

Writing in Auto Express, columnist Mike Rutherford compared the event favourably to the Geneva Motor Show, describing it as filling a significant gap in the European motor show calendar and welcoming the investment made by the show's organisers.

The show has also attracted international press coverage, with reports published in Italian, Turkish, Ukrainian, and Brazilian automotive media.

== Co-located events ==
The London International Motor Show takes place alongside two other automotive events at ExCeL London during the same dates: Motorsport Expo, described by organisers as the UK's largest dedicated motorsport exhibition, and Car Culture UK, focused on modified and aftermarket vehicles. The combined format is intended to broaden the overall audience and increase footfall across all three events.

== Industry reception ==
Coverage from specialist automotive trade publications including Motor Trader and Motor Trade News highlighted the show's lead-generation potential for manufacturers, noting that the event is positioned to attract fleet buyers and business decision-makers alongside general consumers.

The show has also been noted in the exhibition industry press, with Exhibition News covering the broader programme of three co-located motoring events at ExCeL as a significant boost to the venue's 2027 calendar.

Historical context for the show has been documented by automotive heritage sources including ConceptCarz.

== See also ==
- British International Motor Show
- London Motorfair
- ExCeL London
- Geneva Motor Show

== Locations ==
=== Earls Court ===
The cars listed are those announced in the late summer lead up to the show or during it.

Year	Show	New cars announced for this show	Photo
1948	27 October – 6 November; Earls Court, London Attendance 562,954 highest previous attendance 315,000	Aston Martin 2-Litre Sports; Austin A70 Hampshire; Austin A90 Atlantic; Hillman Minx Mark IV; Humber Hawk Mark III; Jaguar Mark V; Jaguar XK120; Lagonda 2.6; Morris Minor; Morris Oxford MO; Morris Six MS; Singer SM1500; Sunbeam-Talbot 80; Sunbeam-Talbot 90; Vauxhall Velox; Vauxhall Wyvern; Wolseley 4/50; Wolseley 6/80	Jaguar XK120 open two seater – October 1948 Morris Minor – September 1948
1949	28 September to 8 October; 34th International Motor Show, Earls Court	Rolls-Royce Silver Dawn; Rover 75; Triumph Mayflower	Rover 75 – September 1949
1950	18 October 1950 – 28 October: Earls Court, London.; 35th International Motor Exhibition.; The world's largest display of Cars, Boats, Caravans; carriage work, marine engines, components and accessories, tyres, transport service equipment and car trailers.; Open daily 10 till 9	Alvis sports tourer; Armstrong Siddeley limousine; Aston Martin DB2 drophead coupé; Austin A70 Hereford saloon and drophead coupé; Austin A40 Sports; Ford Zephyr-Six; Ford Consul; Jaguar Mark VII; Lanchester Fourteen; Lea-Francis 14/70; Morgan Plus Four; Morris Minor 4-door saloon; Nash-Healey 4-litre sports coupé; Singer Nine Roadster series 4 AB; Triumph Roadster; Triumph Mayflower drophead coupé	Jaguar Mark VII – October 1950 Austin A70 Hereford – October 1950 Ford Zephyr Six – October 1950
1951	17 October 1951 – 27 October; Earls Court, London. attendance was down sharply (375,000 from 480,000) because there were few new models and polling day for the General Election fell in the middle of the Show period. The choice models were export-only.	Allard J2X; Austin A30; Daimler 3-litre Regency; Ford Zephyr Six convertible by Carbodies; Healey G-Type Roadster with 3-litre Alvis engine; Lanchester Fourteen drophead coupé; Vauxhall Velox EIP; Vauxhall Wyvern EIX	Vauxhall Velox – August 1951 Austin A30 – October 1951
1952	22 October – 1 November; Earls Court, London; 37th International Motor Exhibition Attendance 462,538, plus about 4,000 from overseas who entered free of charge	Armstrong Siddeley Sapphire; AC Petite; Bentley Continental; Frazer Nash 2.6 roadster; Healey Hundred; Humber Hawk Mark V; Sunbeam-Talbot 90 MkIIA; Triumph TR2 (prototype)	Healey Hundred – October 1952 Triumph TR2 – October 1952
1953	21 to 31 October; Earls Court, London; 38th International Motor Exhibition For the first time since 1938, foreign exhibitors were present, including Mercedes-Benz and Volkswagen Attendance 612,953	Alvis TC 21 Grey Lady; Aston Martin DB2-4; Bristol 404; Ford Popular; Lagonda 3-Litre; MG Magnette; MG TF Midget; Riley Pathfinder; Daimler Conquest Roadster {DJ254}	MG Magnette – October 1953 Riley Pathfinder – October 1953
1954	20 to 30 October; Earls Court, London; 39th International Motor Exhibition Jowett and Lea-Francis do not appear New exhibitors Skoda and DKW New models introduced during the year by Standard, Morris, Singer, Austin, Rootes, Vauxhall, Bentley, and Rolls-Royce Attendance 523,586	Home; Austin A90 Six Westminster; Bentley S Continental Park Ward; Daimler Regency Mark II; Hillman Husky; Jaguar D-Type; Lanchester Sprite; Rover 75 rear lift; Sunbeam Mark III; Vauxhall Cresta; Wolseley Six-Ninety; .; Imported; Mercedes-Benz 300SL; Mercedes-Benz 220a	Austin A90 Six Westminster – October 1954 Bentley S Continental coupé by Park Ward – September 1954
1955	19 to 29 October; Earls Court, London; 40th International Motor Exhibition Exhibitors: UK 30 USA & Canada 17 France 6 Germany 6 Italy 3 Czechoslovakia 1 Attendance 516,811, including overseas visitors 13,750	Home; Alvis TC 108G body by Graber; Armstrong Siddeley 234 and 236; Daimler DK400; Daimler One-O-Four; Jaguar Two-point-four-litre; MG MGA; Morris Isis; Standard Vanguard III; Sunbeam Rapier; Triumph TR3; .; Imported; Borgward Isabella 75; Citroën DS19; Fiat 600; Mercedes-Benz 300c; Volkswagen Microbus (T1b)	Jaguar 2.4 – September 1955 MGA – October 1955 Citroën DS19 —October 1955
1956	17 October 1956 – 27 October; Earls Court, London; 41st International Motor Exhibition Exhibitors: UK 31 USA & Canada 16 France 6 Germany 6 Italy 3 Czechoslovakia 1 Sweden 1 Orders taken at the Motor Show enabled Austin to return to a five-day working week Attendance numbers were not reported	Home; Austin Princess IV; Austin A105; Austin A35; Austin-Healey 100-Six; Berkeley Cars; Jaguar Mark VIII; Lotus Eleven; MGA fixed head coupé; Morris Minor 1000; Morris Oxford Series III; Morris Isis Series II; Rover 105R; Rover 105S; Singer Gazelle; Rover T3 gas turbine car; .; Imported; Volvo Amazon; Fiat 600 Multipla; Goggomobil; Mercedes-Benz 190SL	Austin-Healey 100-Six – September 1956 MGA fixed head coupé – October 1956 Austin Princess IV – October 1956
1957	16 October 1957 – 26 October; Earls Court, London; 42nd International Motor Exhibition	Home; Aston Martin Mark III; Bedford Dormobile Caravan; Bristol 406; Jensen Series-R; Lotus Elite; Riley Two-Point-Six; Standard Ensign; Standard Pennant; Vauxhall Cresta; Vauxhall Velox; .; Announced during the year; Austin A55; Jaguar 3.4; Jaguar XK150 drophead and coupé; Humber Hawk; Vauxhall Victor; Wolseley 1500; .; Announced after the Motor Show; Riley One-Point-Five; .; Imported; Renault Dauphine	Jaguar 3.4 export only id is by spat opening for knock-off hub Lotus Elite – October 1957 Vauxhall Cresta – October 1957
1958	22 October – 1 November; Earls Court, London; 43rd International Motor Exhibition Neither Allard nor Lagonda booked stands at the show Exhibitors: UK 33 USA & Canada 14 France 7 Germany 7 Italy 4 Czechoslovakia 1 Sweden 1 Holland 1 Attendance 534,422	Home; Armstrong Siddeley Star Sapphire; Aston Martin DB4; Austin A40; Austin A105 Vanden Plas; Bristol 406; Daimler Majestic; Humber Super Snipe; Jaguar Mark IX; Rover three-litre; Standard Vignale; .; Announced during the year; Austin Gipsy; Austin Taxicab; Austin-Healey Sprite; Land-Rover series II; .; .; Imported; Chevrolet Impala; DAF 600; Mercedes-Benz 190D; Mercedes-Benz 220SE; Volvo 122S; Renault Floride; Simca Aronde	Austin-Healey Sprite – May 1958 Rover three-litre – September 1958 Austin A40 – October 1958
1959	21–31 October; Earls Court, London. Opened by Prime Minister Harold Macmillan. Visitors to the Motor Show are asked by Scotland Yard to leave their cars at home Attendance: paid 560,310 overseas visitors another 19,707	Home; AC Greyhound; Austin A40 Countryman; Bentley S2; Bristol Zagato; Daimler Majestic Major; Ford Anglia; Ford Popular; Jaguar Mark 2; Jaguar Mark IX; Mini; Princess 3-litre; Riley 4; Rolls-Royce Silver Cloud II; Rover 80; Rover 100; Wolseley 6/99; .; Announced during the year; Austin A55; Austin A99; Daimler SP250; MG Magnette; Sunbeam Alpine; Triumph Herald; .; Imported; Borgward 2300; Chevrolet Corvair; Chrysler Valiant; DKW Junior; Fiat 1800; Ford Falcon; Mercedes-Benz 220; Moskvitch; Panhard PL 17; Volga	Triumph Herald – April 1959 Morris Mini-Minor – August 1959 Ford Anglia – September 1959 Jaguar Mark 2 – October 1959
1960	19 to 29 October; Earls Court, London Attendance: 428,000 reported 12 months later	Home; Austin A60 Countryman; Austin Mini Countryman; Humber Super Snipe; Jensen 541S; Lea-Francis Lynx; Morris Oxford Traveller; Morris Mini-Minor Traveller; Vanguard Luxury Six; Sunbeam Alpine; .; Announced during the year; Triumph Herald convertible; .; Imported; Buick Special	Humber Super Snipe – October 1960 Morris Mini-Minor Traveller – October 1960 Vanguard Luxury Six – October 1960
1961	18 to 28 October; Earls Court, London; 46th International Motor Show The Zagato coachwork stand exhibits a Mini-Minor named Gatto beside a Bristol and an Aston Martin Attendance: 578,034 and a further 20,000+ overseas visitors	Home; Aston Martin DB4 drophead coupé Superleggera; Bristol 407; Cooper Mini-Minor; Daimler 4½ litre V-8 limousine; Ford Consul Classic Capri; Hillman Super Minx; Jaguar Mark X; Triumph TR4; Vauxhall Victor; Vauxhall VX Four-Ninety; .; Announced during the year; E-Type Jaguar; Ford Consul Classic 315 1340 cc; .; Imported; BMW 1500; Citroën Ami 6; Renault 4; Simca 1000; Volkswagen 1500	Daimler V-8 limousine – September 1961 Triumph TR4 – September 1961 Vauxhall Victor – September 1961

Year	Show	New cars announced for this show	Photo
1962	17 to 27 October; Earls Court, London; 47th International Motor Show Attendance: 474,086 and 21,199 more from overseas. It was noted the paid attendance was 103,948 less than last year	Home; Austin-Healey 3000; Bentley; Daimler 2½ litre V-8; Ford Capri 1498 cc; Ford Consul Classic 1498 cc; Ford Consul Cortina 1198 cc; Fairthorpe Rockette; Land-Rover Forward Control; Elva Mark III; Elva Mark IV; Jensen C-V8; Lotus Elan; MGB; Morris 1100; Ogle SX250; Rolls-Royce; Rover 3-Litre coupé; Triumph Spitfire; Vauxhall Cresta; Vauxhall Velox; .; Announced before the Motor Show; Ogle Mini GT; Ford Zodiac; Ford Zephyr; Triumph Vitesse; .; Imported; Renault R8	Morris 1100 – August 1962 Ford Cortina – September 1962 MGB – September 1962 Triumph Spitfire – October 1962 Lotus Elan – October 1962
1963	16 to 26 October; 48th International Motor Show; Earls Court, London Paid attendance believed to be in excess of 550,000 people.	Home; Aston Martin DB5; Bond Equipe GT; Ford Consul Corsair; Jaguar S-type; Lotus Cortina; Rover 2000; Morgan Plus Four Plus; Princess 1100; Reliant Sabre Six; Triumph 2000; Vauxhall Viva; .; Announced during the year; Bond Equipe; Ford Cortina 1498 cc; Hillman Imp; Mini Cooper S; .; Imported; Alfa-Romeo Giulia Sprint GT; BMW 1800; DKW F102; Mercedes-Benz 230SL; Mercedes-Benz 600; NSU Prinz 1000; NSU Spider; Porsche 901	Hillman Imp – May 1963 Vauxhall Viva – September 1963 Jaguar S – September 1963 Triumph 2000 – October 1963 Rover 2000 – October 1963
1964	October 1964; Earls Court, London	Vauxhall Victor; _ October 1964	Vauxhall Victor
1965	20–30 October; Earls Court, London	AC Cobra Mark III; AC convertible by Frua; Aston Martin DB6; Aston Martin Volante; Bentley T-series; Bristol 409; Jensen F. F. Mark III; Lotus Elan coupé; MGB GT; Riley Kestrel; Rolls-Royce Silver Shadow; Triumph 1300; Triumph 2000 estate; Wolseley 1100	MGB GT Rolls-Royce Silver Shadow
1966	19–29 October; Earls Court, London	Home; Aston Martin DBS; Aston Martin DB6 Volante; Ford Zephyr Mark IV; Ford Zodiac Mark IV; Ford Cortina Mark II; Ford estate cars by Abbott; Ford convertibles by Crayford; Hillman Hunter; Jaguar 420; Jensen FF; Singer Vogue; Triumph Vitesse 2-litre; Vauxhall Viva; Imported; Alfa Romeo GTV; Alfa Romeo Duetto; Audi 80; Audi Super 90; BMW 1600; BMW 1800; BMW 2000 Ti Lux; BMW 2000 CS; Fiat 124; Ford Taunus 12; Ford Taunus 15M; Lancia Fulvia Zagato; Maserati Quattroporte; Mercedes-Benz 300SEL; Mercedes-Benz 250SE; Volvo 144	Ford Zodiac Mark IV Hillman Hunter Vauxhall Viva HB
1967	18–28 October; Earls Court, London	Lotus Elan +2; GTM Coupé; Austin/Morris Mini Mk2; Triumph Herald 13/60; NSU Ro 80; Simca 1100; Vauxhall Victor (FD)	Triumph Herald 13/60
1968	16 October 1968 – 26 October 1968; Earls Court, London; The opening ceremony was performed by Princess Alexandra.	Jaguar XJ6; Austin 3-litre (relaunch); Marcos 3-litre	Jaguar XJ6
1969	15 to 25 October; Earls Court, London In September, Earls Court Exhibition workers threatened to strike. The day the show opened, two UK major manufacturers had assembly lines at a standstill.	Home; Daimler Sovereign; Triumph 2000 Mark II; Vauxhall VX 4/90; .; Announced during the year; Austin Maxi; Ford Capri; Lotus Europa S2; TVR Tuscan V6; .; Imported; Alfa Romeo Giulia; Citroën Ami 8; Fiat 128; Renault R12; Saab 99; Škoda 100; Toyota 1900 Mark II	Austin Maxi – April 1969 Renault 12 – July 1969 Daimler Sovereign – October 1969 Triumph 2000 Mark 2 – October 1969
1970	14 to 24 October; Earls Court, London; 55th International Motor Show British makes on display: 28; Foreign makes on display: 46 including a sales team from Russia Four hundred manufacturers of cars, components and accessories There are girls dressed as rabbits, sailors, and as Nell Gwynn, and girls in "extremely inadequate" chain mail It was agreed that Earls Court was no longer an adequate venue	Home; Ford Cortina; Triumph Toledo; Triumph 1500; .; Announced during the year; Austin 3-litre; Hillman Avenger; Triumph Stag; Vauxhall Viva; .; Imported; Citroën GS; Nissan Datsun 1800; Fiat 124 coupé	Hillman Avenger – February 1970 Triumph Stag – June 1970 Ford Cortina – October 1970
1971	19–30 October 1971; Earls Court, London	Home; Humber Super Snipe Series III; Lea-Francis Lynx; Imported; BMW 2000 Touring; Citroen GS Estate; Fiat 127; Fiat 130 Coupe; Lamborghini Urraco; Peugeot 504 Estate Lada 1200	Lea-Francis Lynx
1972	18–28 October; Earls Court, London	Home; Marina Estate; Ford Consul 2500; Ford Granada 3-litre; Imported; Audi 80; Alfa Romeo Alfasud; BMW 3.0CSL; Citroën GS Camargue; Mercedes-Benz S-Class; Peugeot 104; Renault 5	The Aston Martin V8 at the 1972 Motor Show
1973	October 1973; Earls Court, London Seventieth show	Home; Rover 2200; .; Announced during the year; Austin Allegro; .; Imported; Opel Kadett	Austin Allegro – May 1973
1974	16–26 October; Earls Court, London	Aston Martin Lagonda (long wheel-base, four-door version of the Aston Martin V8); Porsche 930 Turbo; Panther De Ville (Worldwide launch, for the basic model it was one of the most expensive cars being displayed at the time); Toyota 1100 (UK launch of the Toyota Publica); .; Announced during the year; Lotus Elite	Lotus Elite
1975	October 1975; Earls Court, London	Lotus Esprit; Lotus Eclat (2+2); Reliant Kitten; Vauxhall Chevette Hatchback	Lotus Esprit
1976	October 1976; Earls Court, London Widely publicised as the last international show at Earls Court 67 makes from 16 countries More diesel cars displayed than ever before	Home; Aston Martin Lagonda; Chrysler Avenger (facelift); Announced during the year; Rover 3500; Triumph TR7 (UK launch); .; Imported; Audi 100; Fiat X1/9 (Right hand drive); Porsche 924 (UK launch); Toyota Crown Estate; Volvo 343	Rover 3500 – June 1976

=== Birmingham ===
Year	Show	New cars announced for this show	Photo
1978	The International Motor Show made its first appearance at the National Exhibition Centre in Birmingham, and attracted record crowds of 908,194.		
1980	The International Motor Show returned to the National Exhibition Centre in 1980 with an additional exhibition hall. The Prime Minister Margaret Thatcher was driven to the show in the new Austin Metro.	Austin Mini Metro World premiere Fiat Panda Honda Quintet Mazda 323 Talbot Tagora TVR Tasmin Concept Cars Citroën Karin Daihatsu Charade electric Toyota FCX-80	
1982	The International Motor Show again appeared at the National Exhibition Centre in Birmingham during October of this year.	The two most notable new launches were the Audi 100 and Ford Sierra. Other new cars included the Austin Ambassador and MG Metro.	
1984	20 October 1984 – 28 October 1984 NEC, Birmingham. 17–19 October were reserved for professional visitors. The show saw a total of 696,183 visitors this year.	Austin Montego Estate – the Design Council award-winning family estate from Austin Rover; Reliant Scimitar SS1; Dutton Rico	Austin Montego Estate
1986	18 October −26 October 1986 NEC, Birmingham.	Jaguar XJ (XJ40); Renault GTA in RHD, British debut	Jaguar XJ
1988	22 October 1988 – 30 October 1988 NEC, Birmingham.	Jaguar XJ220 – debut of Jaguar's 220 mph (350 km/h) all wheel drive (AWD) super car concept vehicle MG Maestro Turbo; Middlebridge Scimitar; Audi Coupé (B3)	Jaguar XJ220
1990	22 – 30 September 1990 NEC, Birmingham (trade days 19–21 September). The show was advertised with the slogan "Fuel your imagination"		
1996	The 1996 show was held at the NEC, Birmingham. The show had 623,000 visitors.		
1998	22 October to 1 November 1998 at the NEC, Birmingham. Saw the launch of two critical saloons from British car manufacturers. Bernd Pischetsrieder, then in charge at BMW, made an impromptu speech about the future of Rover's Longbridge plant. The show had a large attendance of 709,000 visitors.	Rover 75 – debut of the first (and last) Rover with the help of BMW; Jaguar S-Type – all new executive car from Jaguar, retro in design like the Rover.	Rover 75
2000	The International Motor Show remained in the Birmingham NEC during October. Honda made news in claiming it would have fuel cell cars on sale by 2003. Attendance dropped from 1998 to 543,000.		
2002	The 2002 show at the NEC, Birmingham had over 450,000 visitors, a further drop over the two previous shows.	Bentley Continental GT; Invicta S1; MG SV; TVR T350	MG SV
2004	In 2004, the show, branded The Sunday Times Motorshow Live, was held from 27 May – 6 June, instead of the usual October. Attendance increased slightly from the previous year to 461,000, but the organisers had hoped for 600,000.	Farboud GTS; Land Rover Discovery (International debut); Noble M400; Peugeot 407 (United Kingdom Introduction); Peugeot 407 SW (United Kingdom Introduction); Renault Modus; Rover 25/MG ZR facelift Rover 75 Long wheelbase (international debut); Vauxhall Tigra	

=== ExCeL ===
Year	Show	New cars announced for this show	Photo
2006	The 2006 British Motor Show was held in July at the ExCeL Exhibition Centre in London's Docklands. It featured a nightly post-show rock music festival called Dock Rock with concerts by: 19 July, A-Ha; 20 July, Van Morrison; 21 July, UB40; 22 July, Roxy Music; 24 July, Simple Minds; 26 July, Katherine Jenkins, with the National Symphony Orchestra of London; 27 July, Jools Holland, and his Rhythm and Blues Orchestra	Alfa Romeo Spider (United Kingdom Introduction); Aston Martin Rapide (United Kingdom Introduction); Bentley Continental Flying Spur Mulliner Driving Specification; BMW M6 Convertible; Chevrolet Captiva (United Kingdom Introduction); Chrysler Sebring sedan (Europe Introduction); Dodge Nitro (Europe Introduction); Ford Focus coupe convertible (United Kingdom Introduction); Honda Civic 3-door hatchback Jaguar XJR Portfolio; Jaguar XKR; Kia C segment model (codename ED); Land Rover Freelander2/LR2 (World Introduction); Lexus GS 300 Limited Edition; Lotus Europa S (United Kingdom Introduction); Lotus Exige S (United Kingdom Introduction); Mazda BT-50 (Europe Introduction); Mazda3 MPS (United Kingdom Introduction); Mazda MX-5 Roadster Coupe; MINI GP (United Kingdom Introduction); Mitsubishi i (Europe Introduction); Rolls-Royce 101EX (United Kingdom Introduction); Saab 9-3 Convertible BioPower; SEAT León Cupra and FR; SEAT Altea FR; Smart Fortwo EV; Toyota RAV4 (United Kingdom Introduction); Toyota Yaris (United Kingdom Introduction); Vauxhall Corsa 3 door and 5 door (World Introduction); Volvo S60; Volvo S80 (United Kingdom Introduction); Volvo XC90 (United Kingdom Introduction)	Rolls-Royce 101EX
2008	The 2008 British International Motor Show was held at the ExCeL Exhibition Centre in the Docklands from 23 July – 3 August, and was the last regular British International Motor Show. The SMMT promoted an all new showcase of the latest electric vehicle models. "The Electric Vehicle Village" brought together one of the largest collections of zero emissions vehicles ever seen in the United Kingdom, with a display of more than twenty battery powered vehicles. The motor show displayed a number of high priced, high performance electric cars, such as the Lightning GT and Tesla Roadster (2008).	Alfa Romeo Mito (World/United Kingdom Introduction); Ford Focus RS; Lotus Evora (World premiere); Mastretta MXT (first Mexican sports car); Nissan Qashqai+2; Ford Fiesta ECOnetic; Vauxhall Insignia; SsangYong Rexton R-Line; Tesla Roadster Concept cars: Cadillac CTS Coupe; Chevrolet Camaro Convertible; Citroen C-Cactus; Honda OSM; Kia Excee'd Convertible; Kia Kee; Land Rover LRX; Lexus LFA; Lotus Elise Eco; Saab 9-X Biohybrid; Smart electric drive	Land Rover LRX

== References and notes ==
- SMMT history including that of the motor show
- "British International Motor Show". Pietro Frua. – Source of show locations and dates
