= Carrosserie Beutler =

Swiss coachbuilder

Carrosserie + Spritzwerk Beutler AG, previously Gebr. Beutler & Cie. and Carrosserie Beutler AG was a Swiss coachbuilder that manufactured handcrafted bodies on passenger car chassis.

== History ==
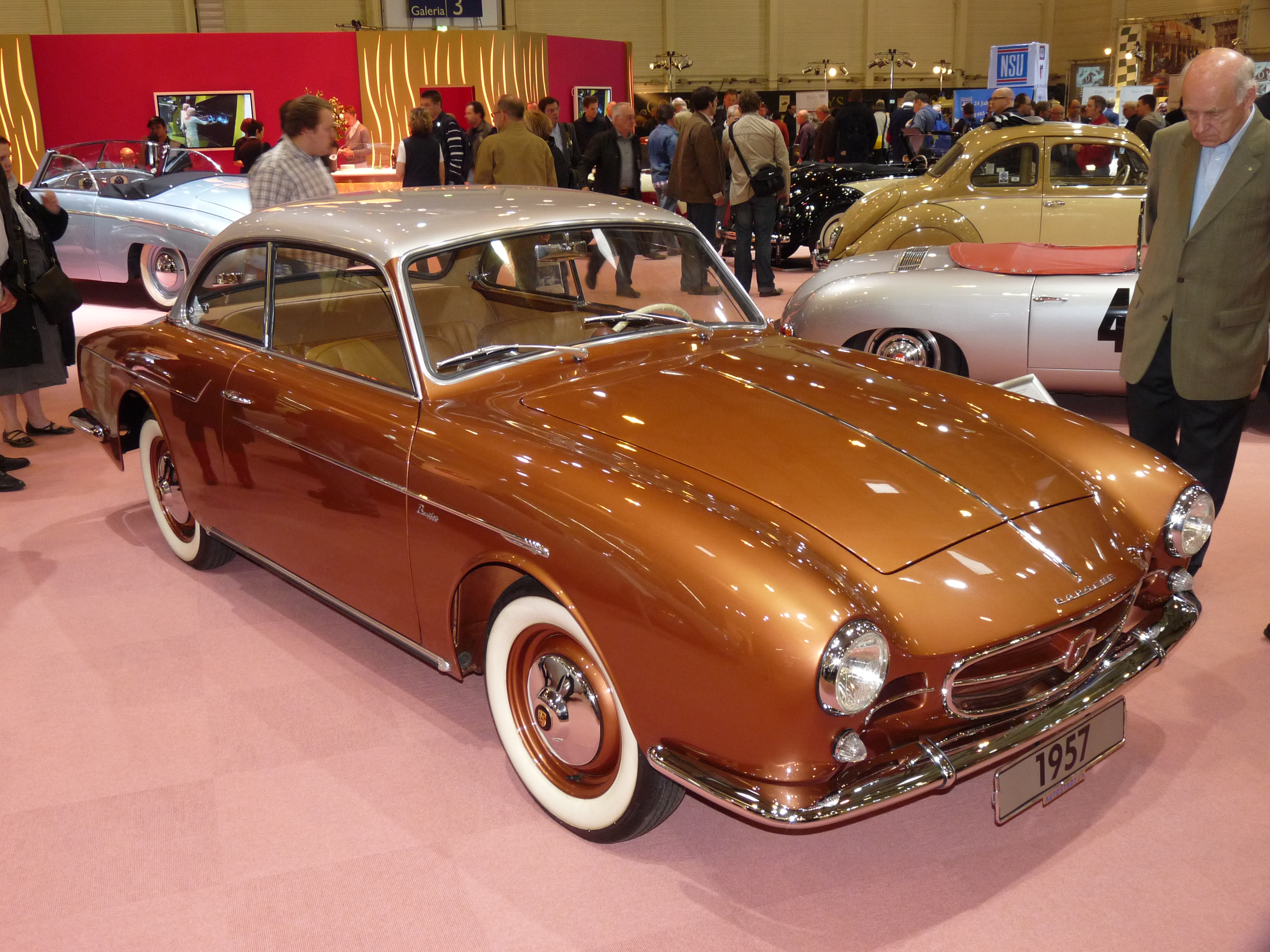
Volkswagen-Porsche Coupé with a Beutler body from 1957

The Gebrüder Beutler company was founded by Ernst and Fritz Beutler in 1943. The company was located at Gwattstr. 40–42 in Thun in the canton of Bern. Beutler concentrated on one-off pieces and very small series production. Beutler specialised in sporty bodies for light European chassis. In 1955 the company name was Gebr. Beutler & Cie. At the beginning of the 1960s it was foreseeable that as a result of the introduction of self-supporting construction and the dwindling number of manufacturers able to provide chassis, the demand for special bodies would decline. In 1966 the company name was Carrosserie Beutler. From 1981 the company was called Carrosserie + Spritzwerk Beutler AG. On 8 September 1987, bankruptcy proceedings were opened.

== Bodywork ==
Beutler manufactured bodies on chassis from many automobile manufacturers, mostly European manufacturers.

=== Austin ===
In 1950, Beutler showed a convertible based on the Austin A70 and A90 at the Geneva Motor Show.

=== Bentley ===
Based on a Bentley Mark VI from 1947, a convertible was created following a customer order, which received a "more modern" body just two years later, also at Beutler. Beutler used the existing body structure.

=== BMW ===
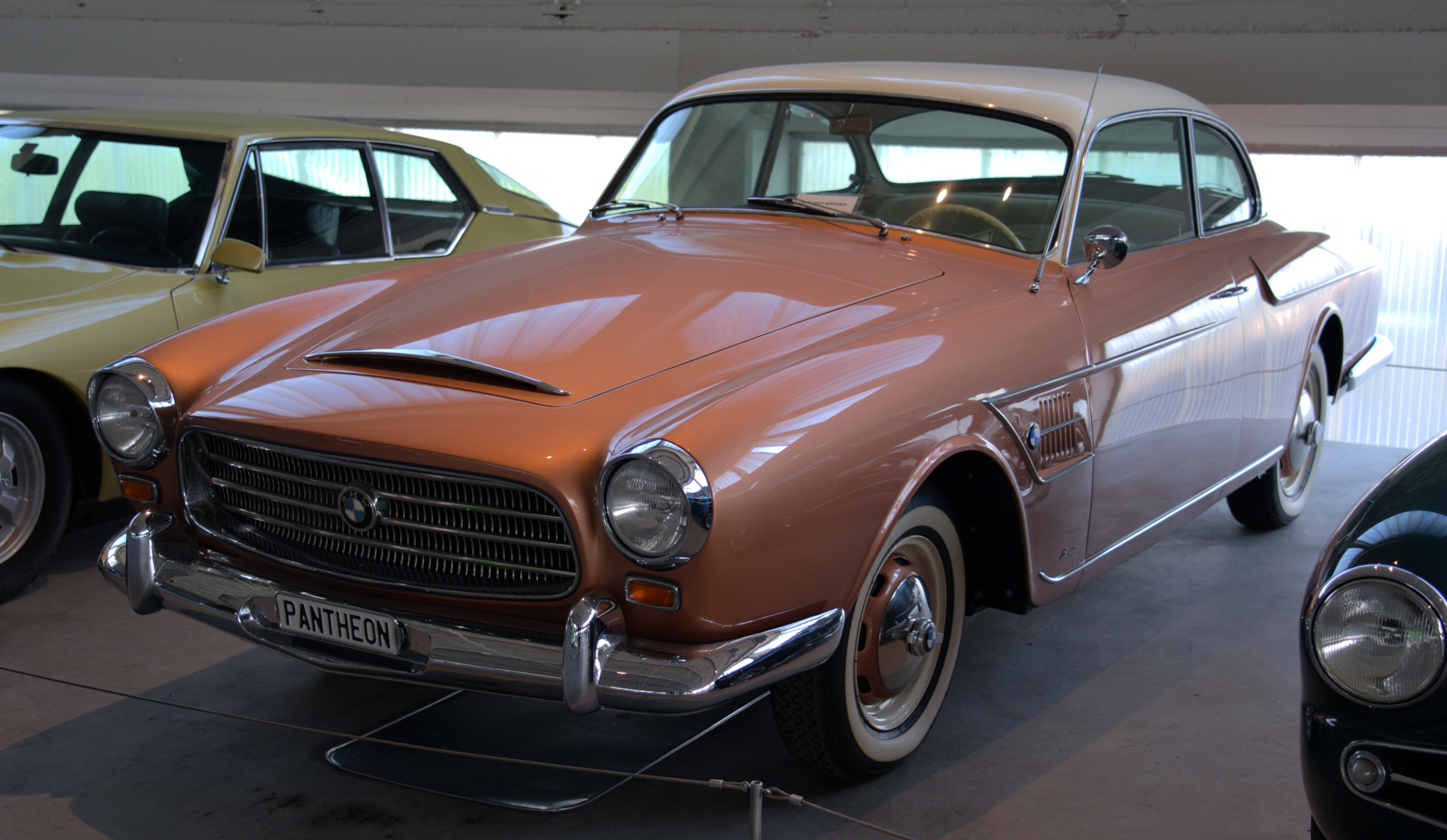
1955 BMW 502 Beutler Coupe

In 1961, Beutler built a coupé based on the BMW 503.

=== Bristol ===
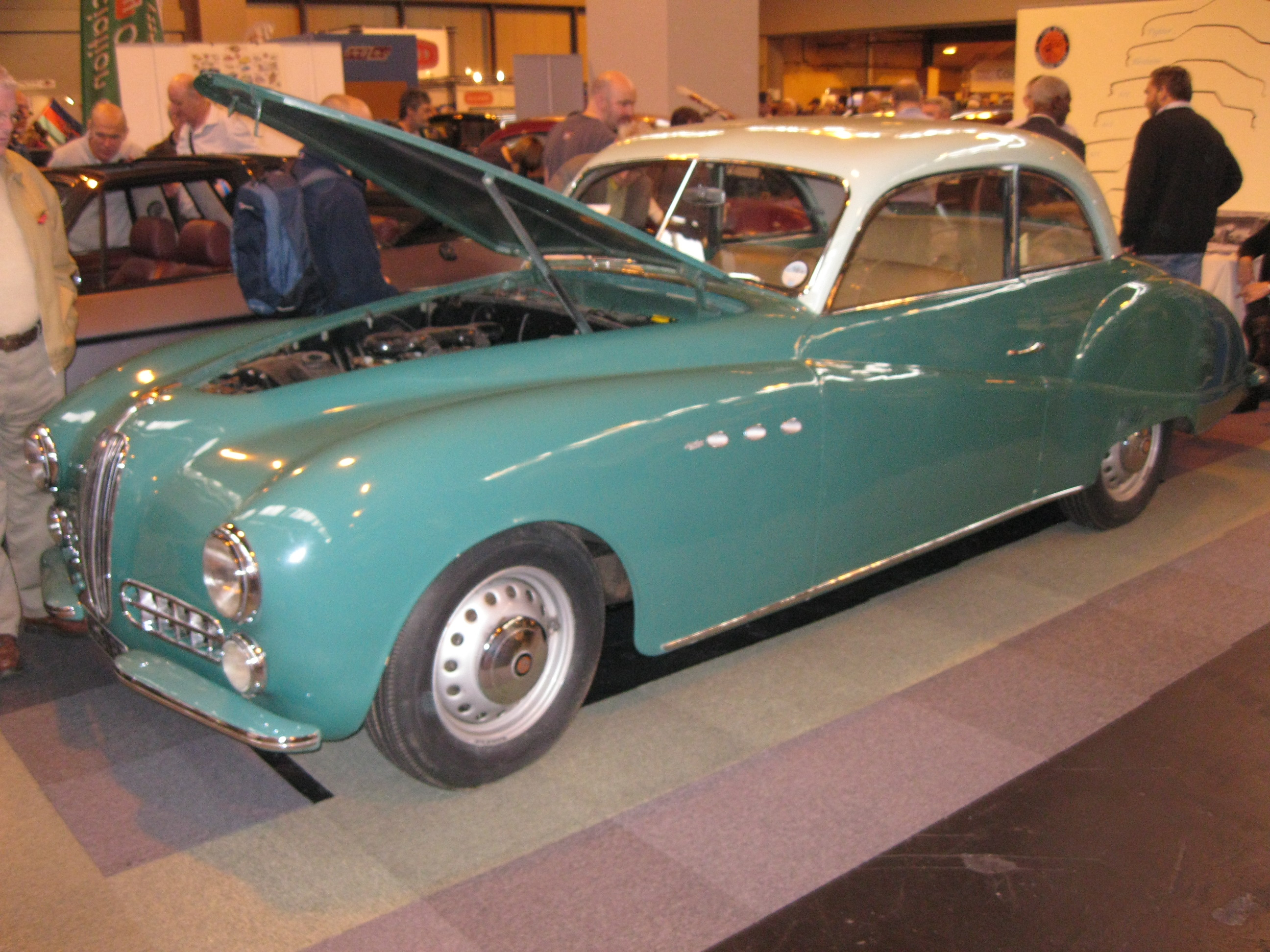
Bristol 401 with a body by Beutler

When Beutler showed a coupé and a convertible based on the Bristol 401 at the Geneva Motor Show, they had to compete with international competition: the factory body was designed by Touring Superleggera, and Pininfarina also offered variants. Both Beutler vehicles have been preserved and restored. The originally ivory-colored coupé with a black roof is now painted dark green with a gray roof.

In 1957, contact with Bristol was revived. The British company commissioned Beutler to design a body for the prototype of the Bristol 406. Beutler designed a two-seater coupé in the pontoon style. The filigree roof structure was typical for Beutler. The rear wings were slightly bulging and had a slight "swing". Fins were suggested at the rear. Beutler produced one example of the vehicle and showed it to the public for the first time in October 1957 at the Earl's Court Motor Show in London. Bristol, however, opted for a more conservative body built by Jones Bros. in Willesden UK. Beutler may have fitted two more Bristol 406s for private customers.

=== Bugatti ===
Beutler received the 14th order for a new body in 1947. It was for a 4/5 seater convertible on a Bugatti Type 49 with a 3.2 liter eight-cylinder inline engine. At the same time, Beutler also installed a Cotal pre - selector gearbox, a rather unusual job for a body shop. With its front, offset "ponton" fenders and hinted rear ones, it corresponds to the taste of the time. The design was made of aluminum over an aluminum frame and is considered to be precise and accurately made. The use of large, free-standing headlights was rather conservative at the time. They were supplied by the Swiss automotive supplier Scintilla AG in Solothurn (part of the Bosch Group since 1954 and today a garden equipment manufacturer). The vehicle still exists.

=== Citroën ===
Far less well known than the Chapron factory convertible for the Citroën DS19 is the version by the Beutler brothers, a few examples of which were produced in 1959 and 1960. The figures for the number of units produced vary between one and four. The Beutler design had less chrome trim than the Chapron version. The rear doors were welded shut.

=== Delahaye ===
Most of the notable manufacturers of French luxury cars had to give up after the Second World War, not least because a luxury tax was introduced in France, which caused the domestic market to collapse. One of the last of these brands was Delahaye. In addition to Faget & Varnet, Motta, Graber and of course Chapron, Beutler also dressed some Type 235s.

=== Fiat ===
In 1956, Beutler offered a different body based on the Fiat 600 for a price of 4,000 Swiss francs. The front and rear were extended, but the interior dimensions remained unchanged.

=== Healey ===
A coupé and two convertibles were built by Beutler on chassis from the Donald Healey Motor Company in Warwick (United Kingdom). All of them appear to have been versions with the 2.4-litre Riley engine. At least the coupé has been preserved.

=== Jaguar ===
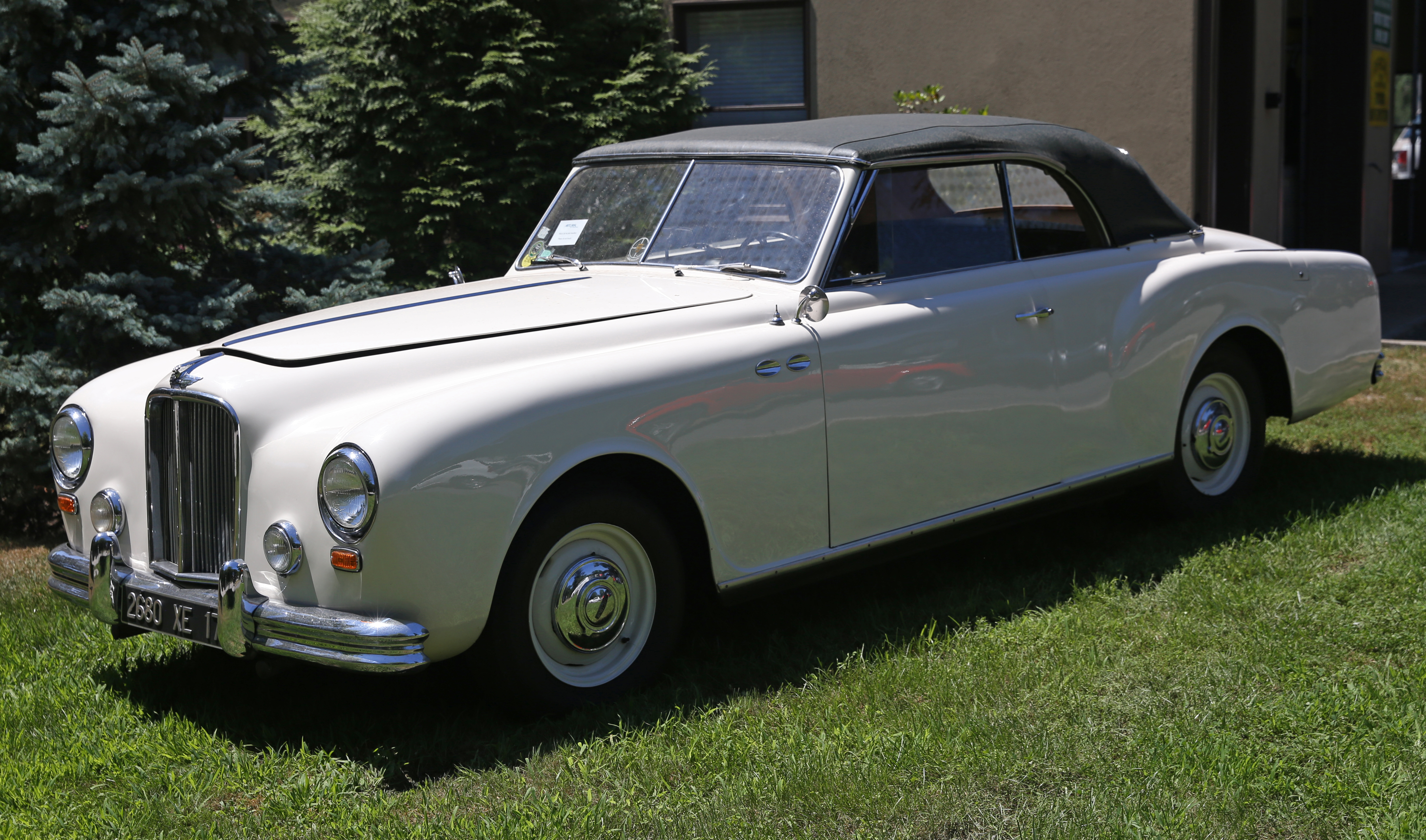
1953 Jaguar Mark VII Convertible with a body by Beutler

In 1953 Beutler built a convertible based on the Jaguar Mark VII.

=== Jowett ===
In 1951, a convertible with rear emergency seats was built based on the Jowett Jupiter. The vehicle was equipped with right-hand drive and achieved second place in a beauty contest in Lucerne.

=== Lancia ===
Lancia built the Aurelia B21 from 1952. Beutler soon presented their own, more conventionally shaped version of a coupé as a complement to the roadster and coupé versions from Pininfarina.

=== Maico ===
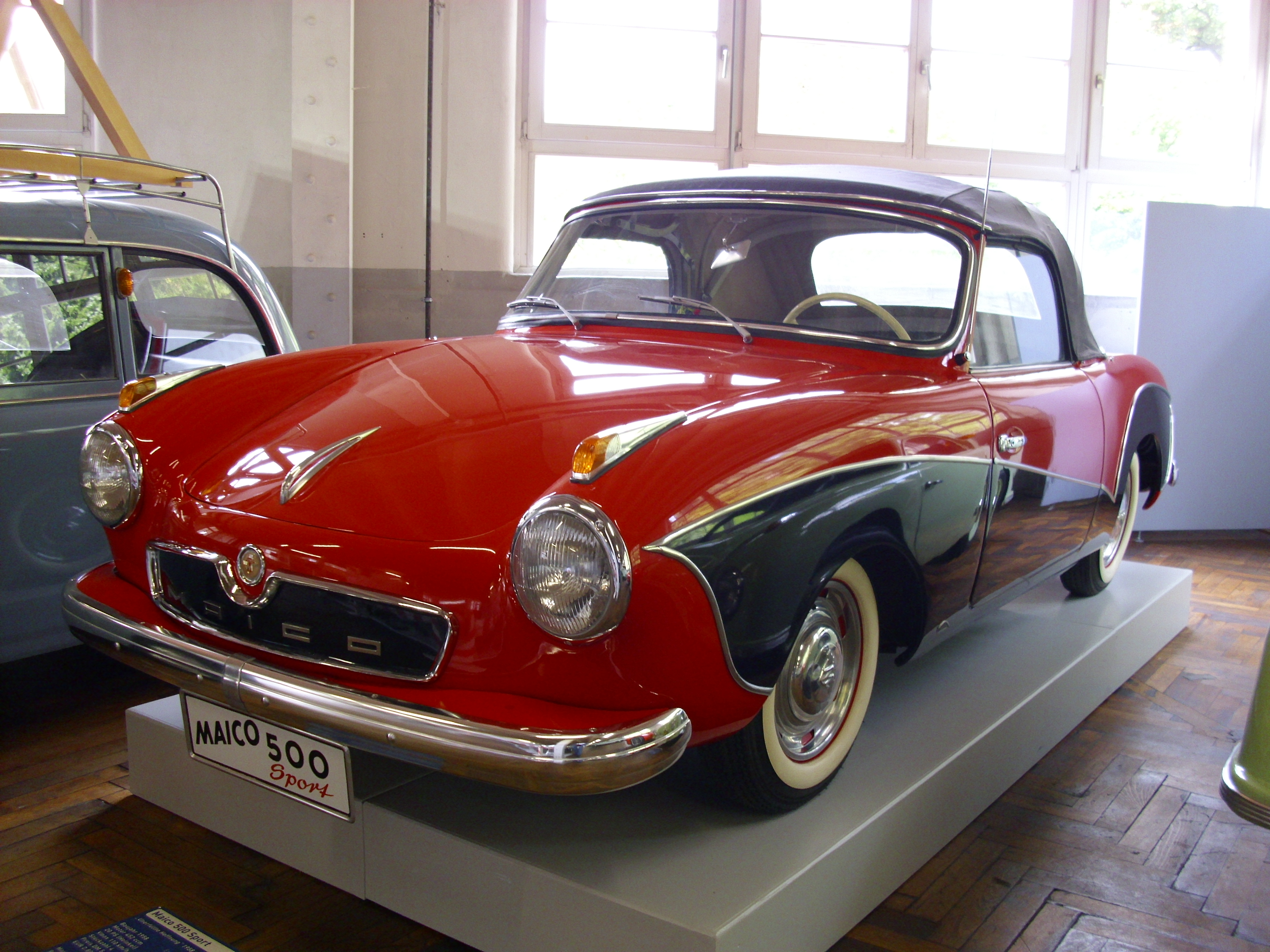
Maico 500 Sport with a body by Beutler

Beutler built four examples of the 500 Sport as a convertible for the small car manufacturer Maico. Beutler also designed a coupé version of the model. The prototype was shown at the New York Auto Show in 1958, but series production was not carried out due to the client's financial difficulties.

=== Packard ===
In 1951, Beutler built a convertible body based on a Packard for a customer. A special feature was a radiator grille in pre-war design. The front fenders extended into the side door. The rear wheels were covered.

=== Porsche ===
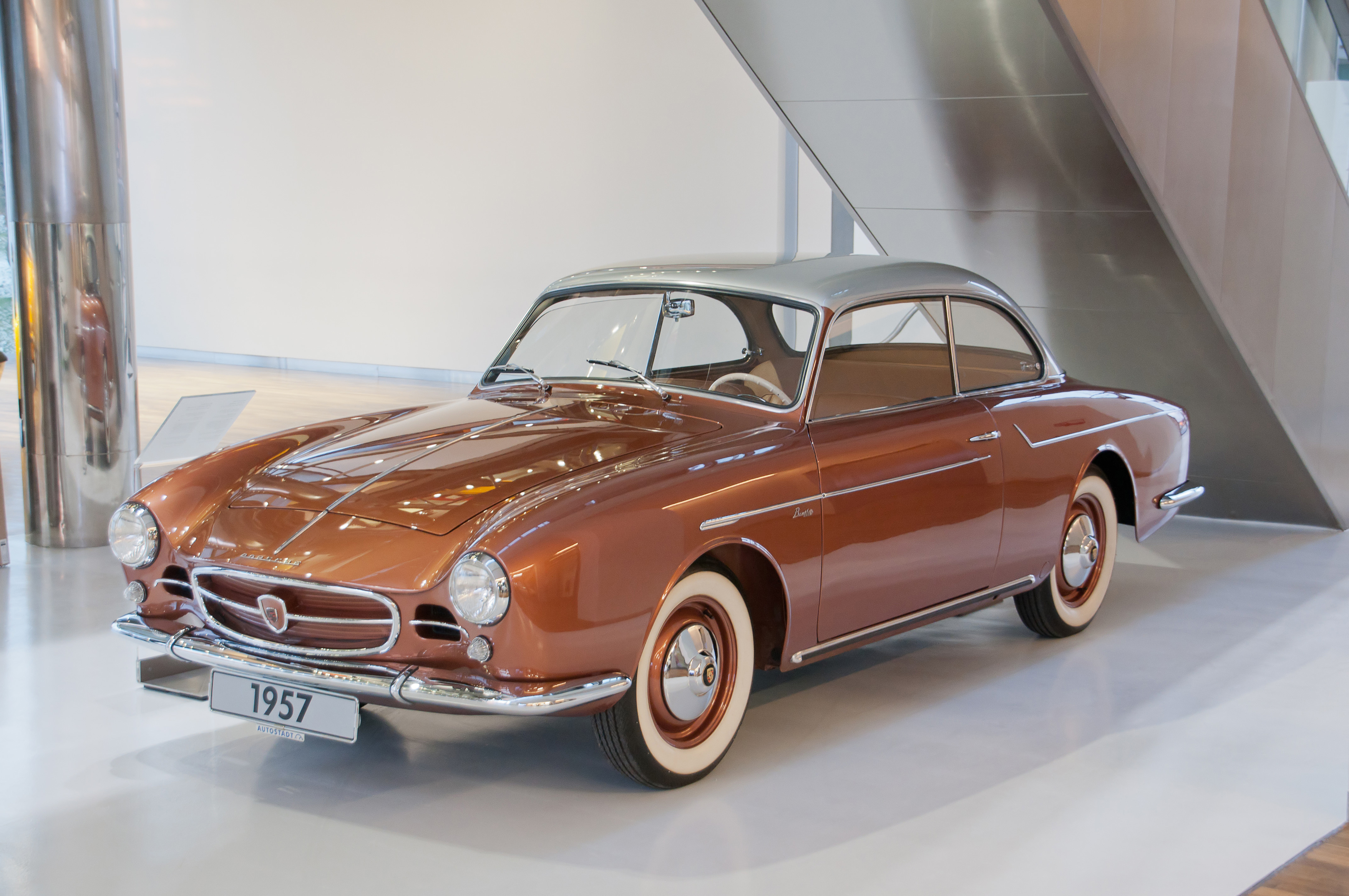
Volkswagen-Porsche Beutler

Porsche was one of the first customers. From 1948 to 1949, Beutler built a small series of six convertibles of the new 356, probably on order from the Swiss car importer AMAG. At that time, Porsche was based in Gmünd. The third vehicle in this series still exists in Switzerland. Here the convertible cost CHF 12,220.

In 1957, the Beutler brothers were commissioned to build more bodies, this time for a 356 B Coupé. Two prototypes were ready in November 1959. The design was clearly derived from the Beutler Coupé for VW from 1956/1957. The body was made of aluminum. Fittings, bumpers and tail lights were taken from the factory version. Ferry Porsche approved the design. Nevertheless, only five Beutler 356 Bs were built. There seem to have been differences in the order processing in contact with the customer, as a result of which Porsche stopped supplying components.

=== Rolls-Royce ===
Beutler built a hotel bus on the chassis of a Rolls-Royce Phantom II, which was extended.

=== Salmson ===
A new body was also built on the chassis of a Salmson.

=== Simca ===
In 1958, Beutler built a coupé based on the Simca Aronde 1300. The vehicle had a strikingly wide, oval radiator grille and still exists today.

=== Volkswagen ===
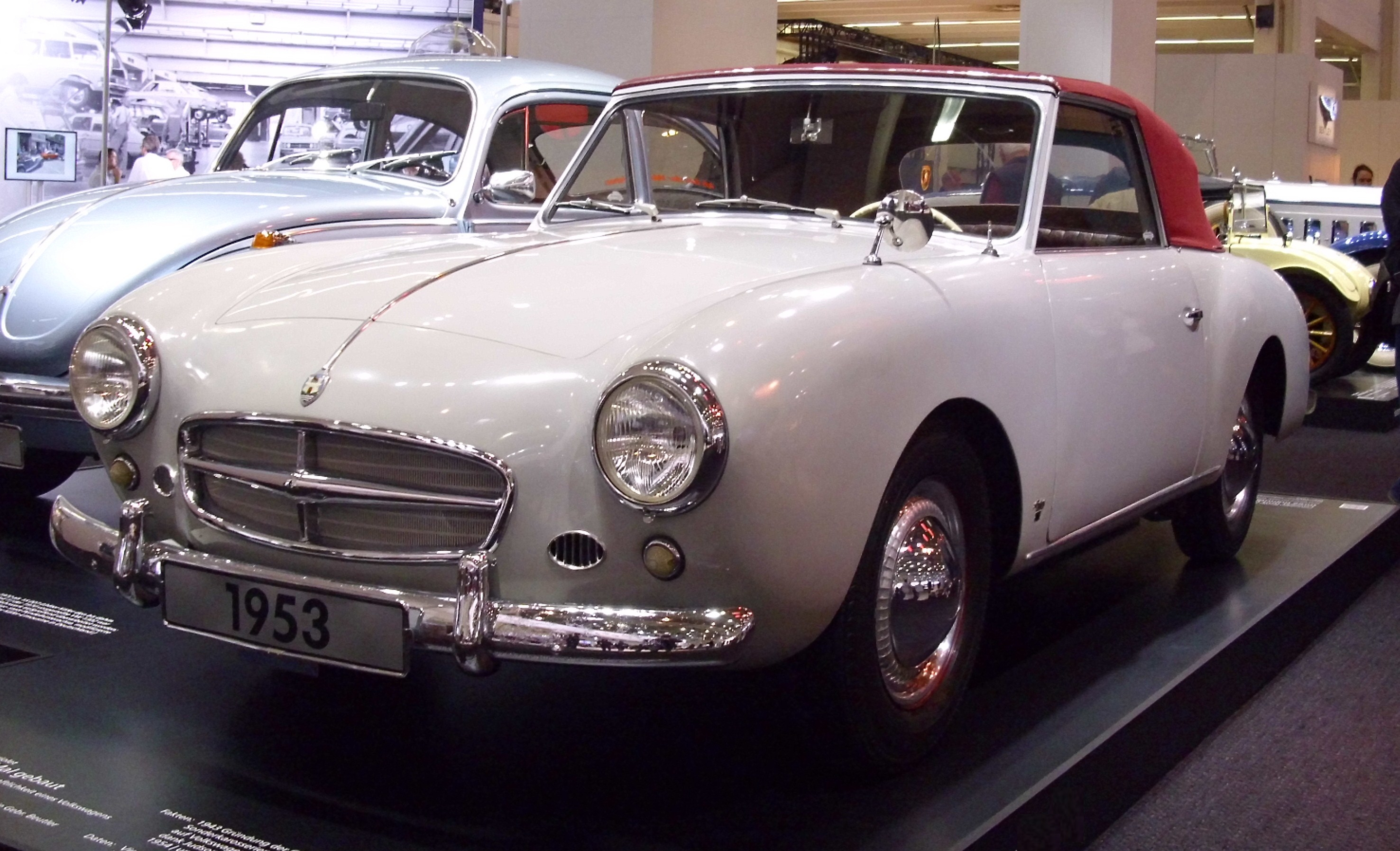
Cabriolet based on a Volkswagen

Beutler manufactured commercial vehicles based on the Volkswagen Beetle. In addition to pick-ups, station wagons and small delivery vans were produced. The latter offered a payload of 250 kg (551 lb).

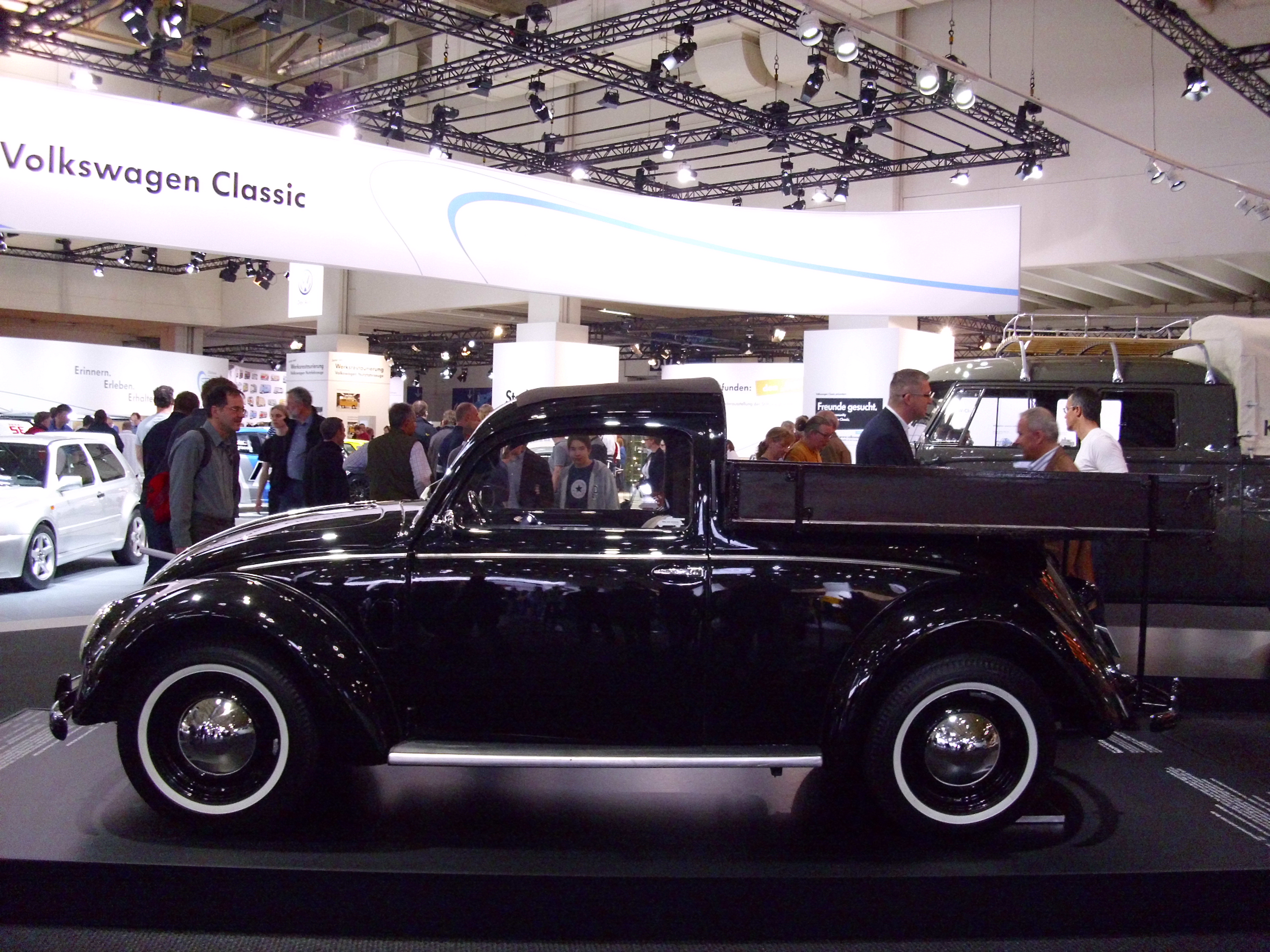
Pick-up based on a Volkswagen Beetle

A coupé with French lines based on the Beetle was introduced in 1957. Volkswagen was not interested in outside companies competing with its own Karmann. It seems that this or a similar design was later offered to Porsche.

== Bugatti replicas ==
Around 1970, Beutler began offering replicas of the Bugatti Type 57 convertible. The vehicles were to be built by hand. It is not known whether such replicas were ever built, how many were built, or what their engines were. After 1981, they were no longer advertised.

== Tuning ==
In the 1980s, Beutler took part in the emerging market for vehicle tuning. Under the name Beutler California, some conversions of the Porsche 911 were created with spoilers and fender flares. In addition, in 1981 and 1982, the Twin-Top model with a T-Top Targa roof was available based on the Mazda RX-7.

== Literature ==
- Roger Gloor: Nachkriegswagen, 2. Auflage (1981), Hallwag AG, Bern und Stuttgart, Hrsg. Automobil Revue, ISBN 3-444-10263-1
- Dieter Günther, Rob de La Rive Box, Max Stoop: Schweizer Automobile. Personenwagen und Sonderkarosserien von 1945 bis heute. Autovision, Hamburg 1992, ISBN 3-9802766-2-7
- Auto Katalog Nr. 24 (1980/81), Vereinigte Motor-Verlage, Stuttgart, S. 130.
- Auto Katalog Nr. 25 (1981/82), Vereinigte Motor-Verlage, Stuttgart, S. 137.
- Auto Katalog Nr. 26 (1982/83), Vereinigte Motor-Verlage, Stuttgart, S. 128.
- Auto Katalog Nr. 28 (1984/85), Vereinigte Motor-Verlage, Stuttgart, S. 136.
