= Dutton Cars =

British kit car manufacturer

Dutton Cars badge/logo

Dutton Cars, based in Worthing, Sussex, England, was a maker of kit cars between 1970 and 1989. In terms of number of kits produced, it was the largest kit-car manufacturer in the world.

The company was founded by Tim Dutton-Woolley and run from a small workshop in which a series of cars named P1 was built. In October 1971, the B-Type appeared with a more or less standard specification and based on Triumph Herald components. A move was also made to a larger factory in Tangmere, Chichester.

== Products ==
Most Duttons depended on a ladder-frame chassis built from steel profiles, which held the various parts taken from the donor car. After originally using Triumph Herald parts, most Duttons kits used Ford Escort Mk 1 or Mk 2 components.

The B-Type eventually evolved into the Dutton Phaeton. Later versions of the Phaeton were based on Ford Escort components and were produced until 1989. These were also available as fully built-up cars, in which case they received a 1.6-litre Ford Crossflow engine with 84 hp (63 kW).

In 1979, Dutton launched the Dutton Sierra, an Escort-based estate car with off-road looks. Three years later, the Ford Motor Company decided to use the Sierra name on their Cortina/Taunus replacement, and served Dutton with a legal writ demanding that they stop using the name. At a case in the High Court in London, though, Dutton won the right to continue with the name on kit cars, as the judge ruled that they were a separate category from assembled cars. The case was popularly portrayed as a "gritty David and Goliath battle", and provided Dutton with some welcome publicity. The Sierra was Dutton's best seller for many years, production reaching a peak of 22 cars a week. The model was withdrawn in 1989. A further move to larger premises back in Worthing was made in 1982 with glass-fibre body making at a separate works in Lancing.

On the usual rear-wheel-drive Escort underpinnings, Dutton placed the body of the new Rico. It made its debut in October 1984, at the Birmingham Motor Show. It used the mechanical parts and doors from a two-door Escort but had a Dutton-developed glass-fibre body over a steel tubular frame. The Rico was a compact and aerodynamic two-door saloon, 3,911 mm (154.0 in) long and much lighter than the donor car. The Rico was a new concept for kit cars, a sporting saloon of modern appearance rather than the typical, traditional two-seat roadster or replica.

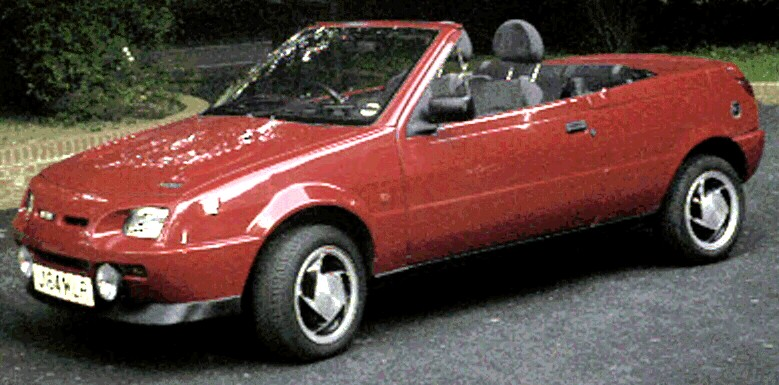
Hacker Maroc S2

By 1984, 80 people were employed spread over four factories and a large showroom in Worthing – production topped 1,000 a year. By 1989, Tim Dutton had become bored with the kit-car scene and all the designs were sold. A new model had been developed called the Maroc, a heavily modified Ford Fiesta with a convertible body. Initially, it was available as a factory-finished car, but prices became too high, and from 1993, kit versions were made available. The design has been sold on to Novus of Bolney, Sussex; availability continued until at least 2006.

After leaving the kit-car business, Tim Dutton operated as a consultant, but returned to the automobile-making business in 1995 with the Dutton Mariner and Dutton Commander, amphibious cars based on the Ford Fiesta and Suzuki Samurai. The Dutton Surf, based on the current Suzuki Jimny, was introduced in 2005. Tim Dutton is now a record holder as the only person to have crossed the English Channel twice in an amphibious car.

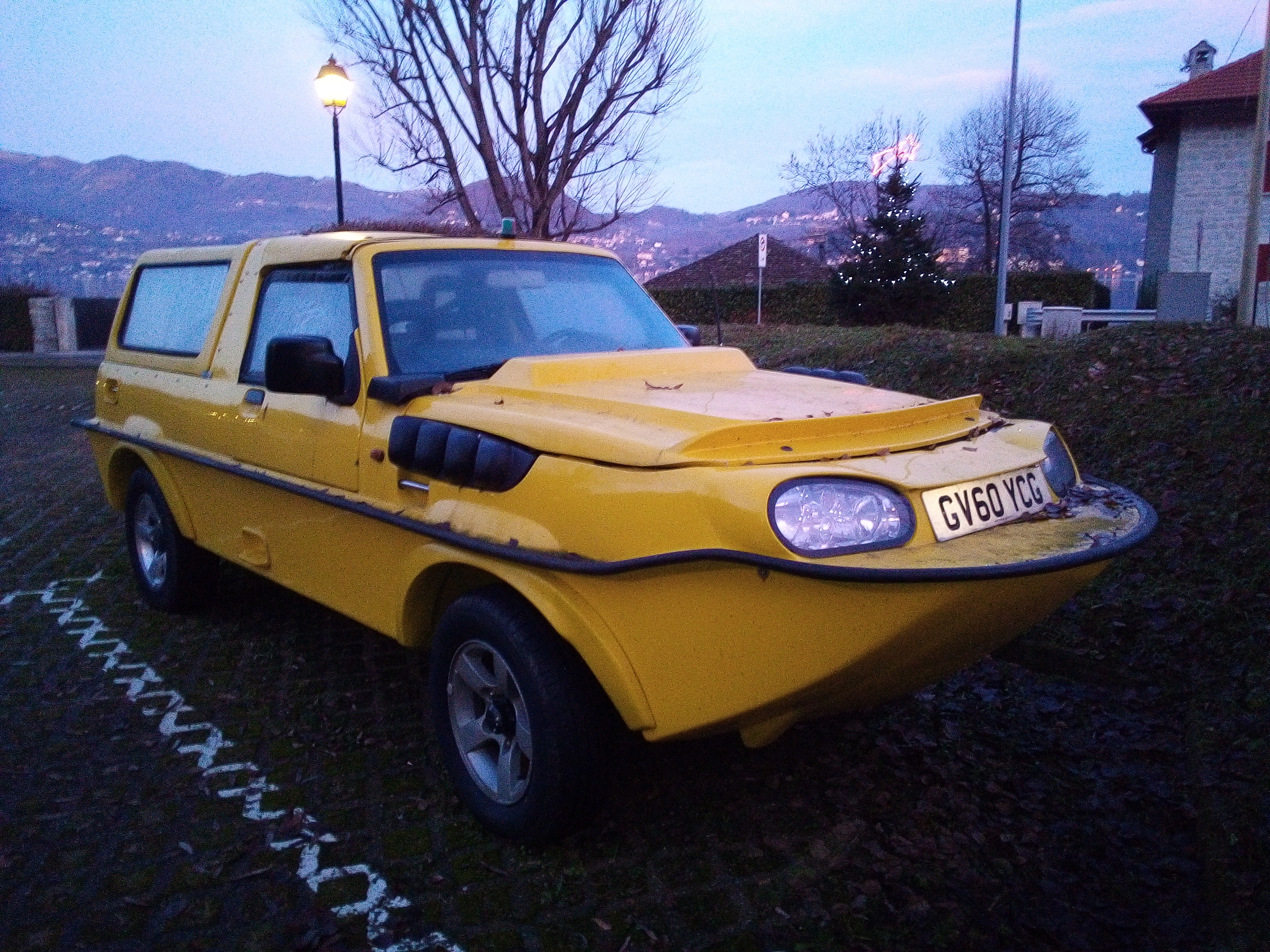
Dutton Surf al Lago d'Orta

Early Dutton kits are now hard to obtain. Most Duttons have already been assembled and are only available to purchase as second-hand cars, usually in need of some restoration. When a Dutton is purchased in kit form, the person building needs a donor car to provide the engine, gearbox, and many other essential components. Fords are the most common donor cars, especially for Duttons. Most people use donor cars that would no longer be roadworthy and use the spares to create a new kit car.

== Models ==
Dutton Cars models
Type	Year	Image	Notes
Dutton P1	1970–71		Lotus 7-like car based on MG Midget mechanical parts, aluminium body panels, glass-fibre wings
Dutton B Type	1971–74		Triumph Herald based, body mainly made from glass-fibre, Ford engine optional
Dutton B Plus	1974–77		Rear axle now Ford Cortina, but with coil springs
Dutton Malaga	1974–77		Front wings moulded in with the body
Dutton Malaga B+	1975–77		Malaga front and B+ rear
Dutton Cantera	1976–77		Coupé version of Malaga B+
Dutton Phaeton Series 1	1977–1981		Updated Malaga B+
Dutton Phaeton Series 2	1980–82		Rear suspension modified to use Cortina springs
Dutton Phaeton Series 3	1981–86		Modified chassis to use Ford Escort components
Dutton Phaeton Series 4	1986–89		Modified body with integral bumpers
Dutton B Plus Series 2	1989		B Plus incorporating Phaeton body style
Dutton Melos	1981–89		Phaeton chassis with new body with more rounded styling, 2+2 seating configuration
Dutton Legerra	1988–89		The first Dutton sports car with opening doors
Dutton Sierra Series 1	1980–84		Ford Escort-based four-seater, estate car/off-road styling, an early, two-wheel-drive SUV
Dutton Sierra Series 2	1984–86		Improved body with some double-skinned panels
Dutton Sierra Series 3	1986–89		New body but very similar in styling to Series 2
Dutton Sierra Drop Head	1983–89		No roof, pick-up version also made
Dutton Rico	1984–89		Escort-based four-seat, two-door saloon
Dutton Rico Shuttle	1986–89		Estate car version of the Rico
Dutton Beneto	1989		"SUV" styled version of the Rico
