= Bristol 406 =

Overview
- Manufacturer: Bristol Cars (then Bristol Aeroplane Co.)
- Production: 1958–1961; 174 units
- Assembly: United Kingdom: Filton

Body and chassis
- Class: Sports car (S)
- Body style: 2-door saloon
- Layout: FR

Powertrain
- Engine: 2,216 cc OHV I6
- Transmission: 4-speed manual with overdrive

Dimensions
- Wheelbase: 2,896 mm (114.0 in)
- Length: 4,978 mm (196.0 in)
- Width: 1,727 mm (68.0 in)
- Curb weight: 1,365 kg (3,009 lb); 1,092 kg (2,408 lb) (Zagato)

Chronology
- Predecessor: Bristol 404 and 405
- Successor: Bristol 407

The Bristol 406 is a luxury car produced between 1958 and 1961 by British manufacturer Bristol Aeroplane Co. Bristol Aeroplane's car division later became Bristol Cars.

It was the last Bristol to use the BMW-derived pushrod straight six engine that had powered all cars built by the company up to that point. In a stopgap measure for the 406 its torque was improved by a 245 cc increase in capacity because it was clearly unable to give a performance comparable to that of newer engines emerging at the time.

== Body ==
A prototype with a body by Carrosserie Beutler of Thun in Switzerland was exhibited in 1957 in both Paris and London Motor Shows. The start of production at Filton was announced in late August 1958. Most of the bodies for the 406 were manufactured by Jones Brothers in London. The styling made the 406 more of a luxury car than a true sports saloon. It was, nevertheless, described as "a delight to drive" by a 1974 reviewer from Car magazine. Buyers also could arrange considerable changes to the specification of their own particular vehicle.

== Engine ==
Compared to the 405, the 406 saw several changes. The most important was that the six-cylinder engine itself was enlarged slightly in both bore and stroke to dimensions of 68.7 by 99.64 mm (2.70 by 3.92 in). This gave an engine displacement of 2,216 cc (135.2 cu in) but the actual power of the engine was no greater than that of the 405. However, the torque was higher than for the smaller engine, especially at low engine speeds.

Manufacture of the 2-litre version continued for supply to AC Cars for their AC Ace and Aceca.

== Suspension and brakes ==
The 406 also featured Dunlop-built disc brakes on all four wheels (making it one of the first cars with four-wheel disc brakes) and a two-door saloon body Bristol were to stick with for a long period after adopting Chrysler V8 engines with the 407.

The rear suspension of the 406 also did away with the outdated A-bracket of all previous Bristols for a more modern Watt's linkage. The 406 was the world's first production car to be thus equipped. However, the outdated front suspension of previous Bristols was retained and not updated until the following model with its more powerful drivetrain.

== Zagato ==
Two short-wheelbase 406s, known as 406Ss, were bodied by Zagato. In all, there were only six 406s with Zagato bodies. Rather than the 105 hp (78 kW) of the standard cars, these received a modified engine with 115 hp (86 kW) and a stainless Abarth exhaust, which combined with the considerably lighter weight to improve the performance of the 406.

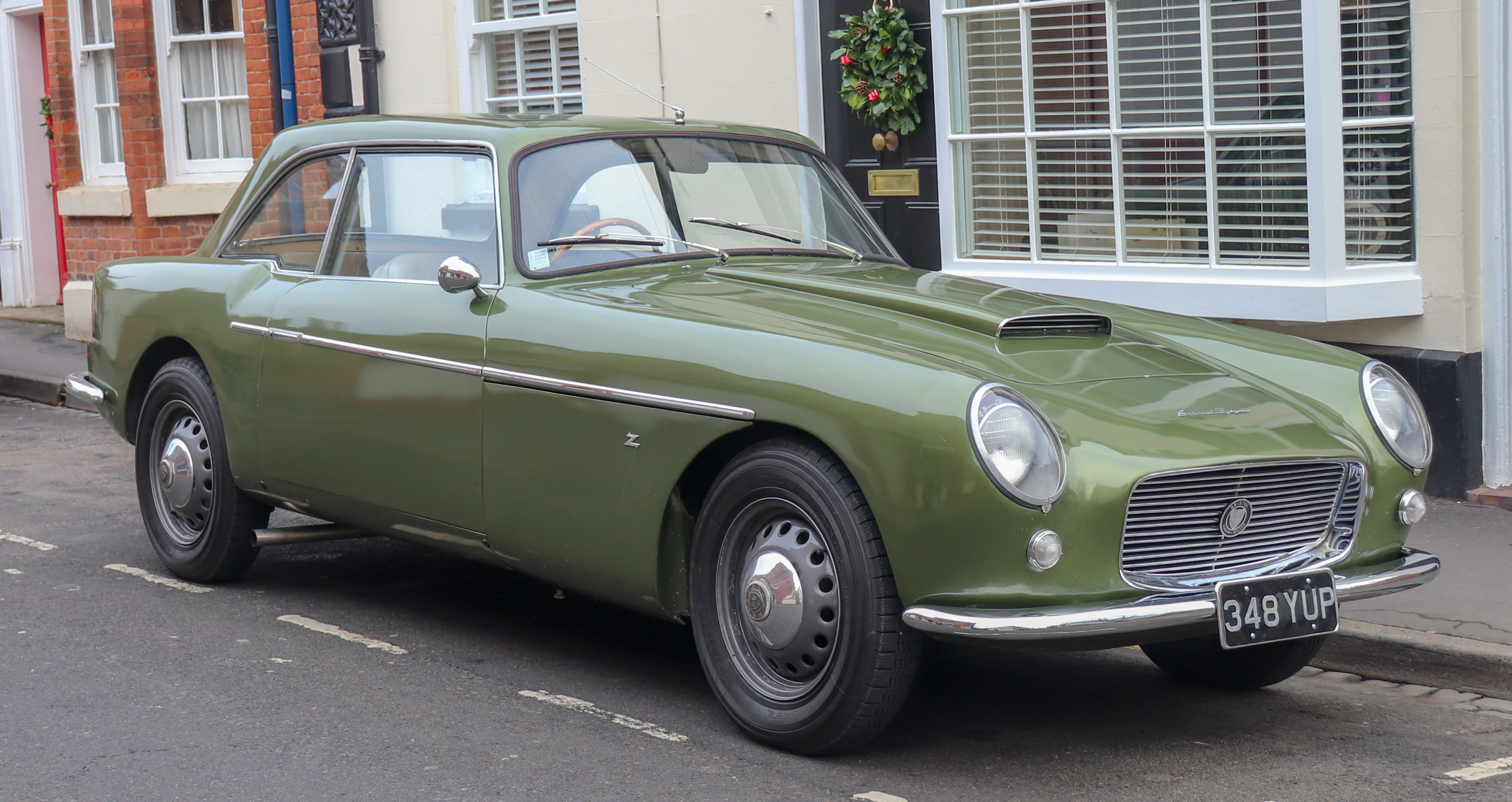
Bristol 406 Zagato

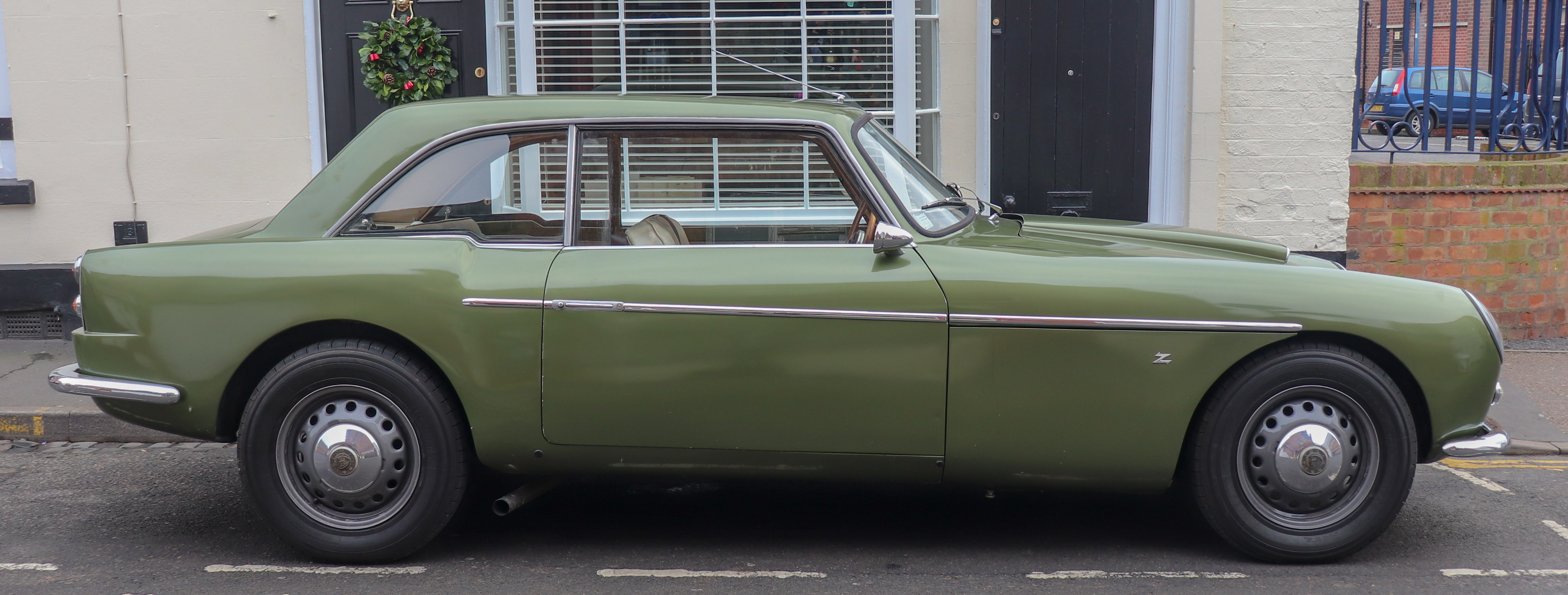
Side

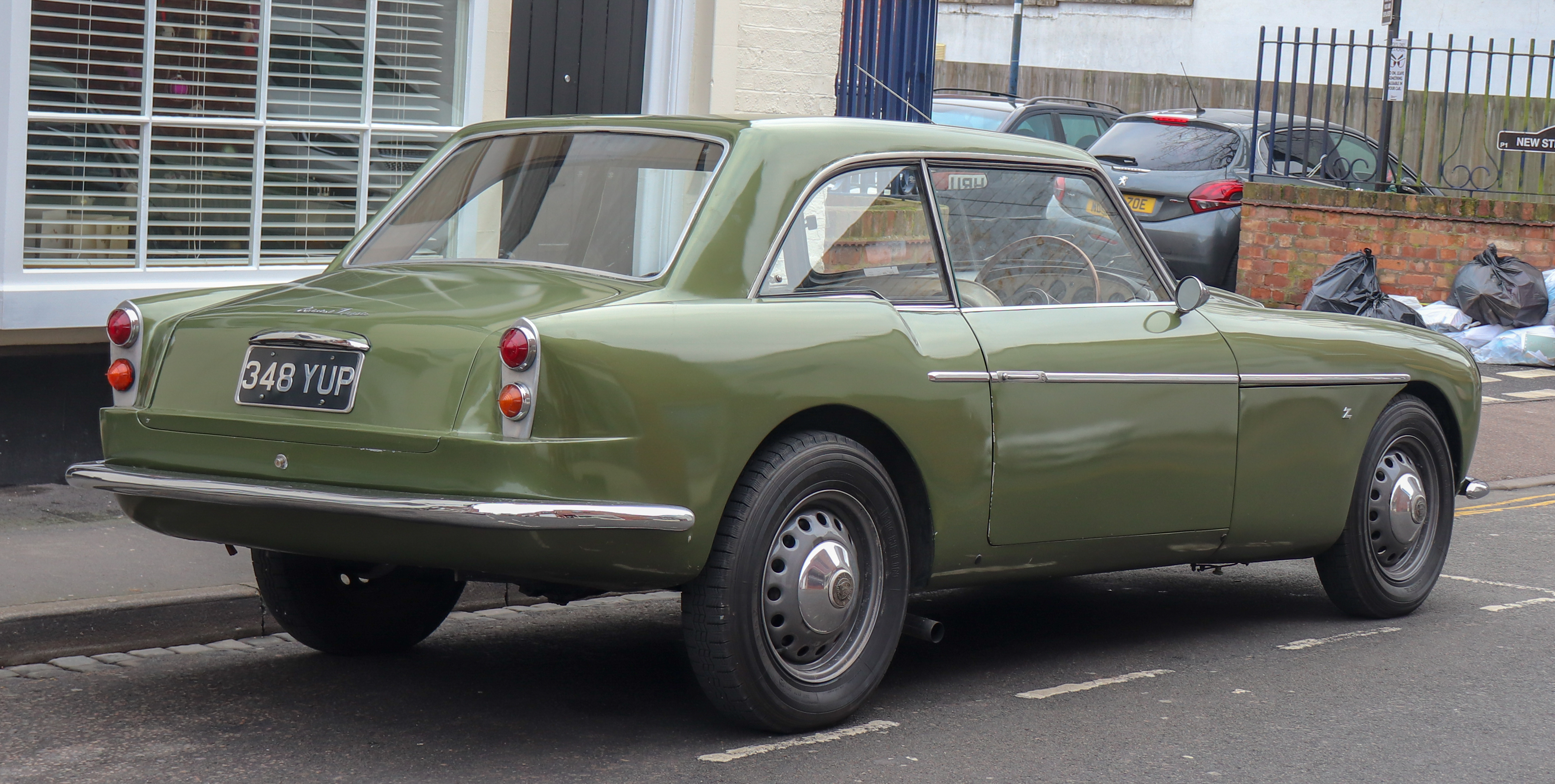
Rear

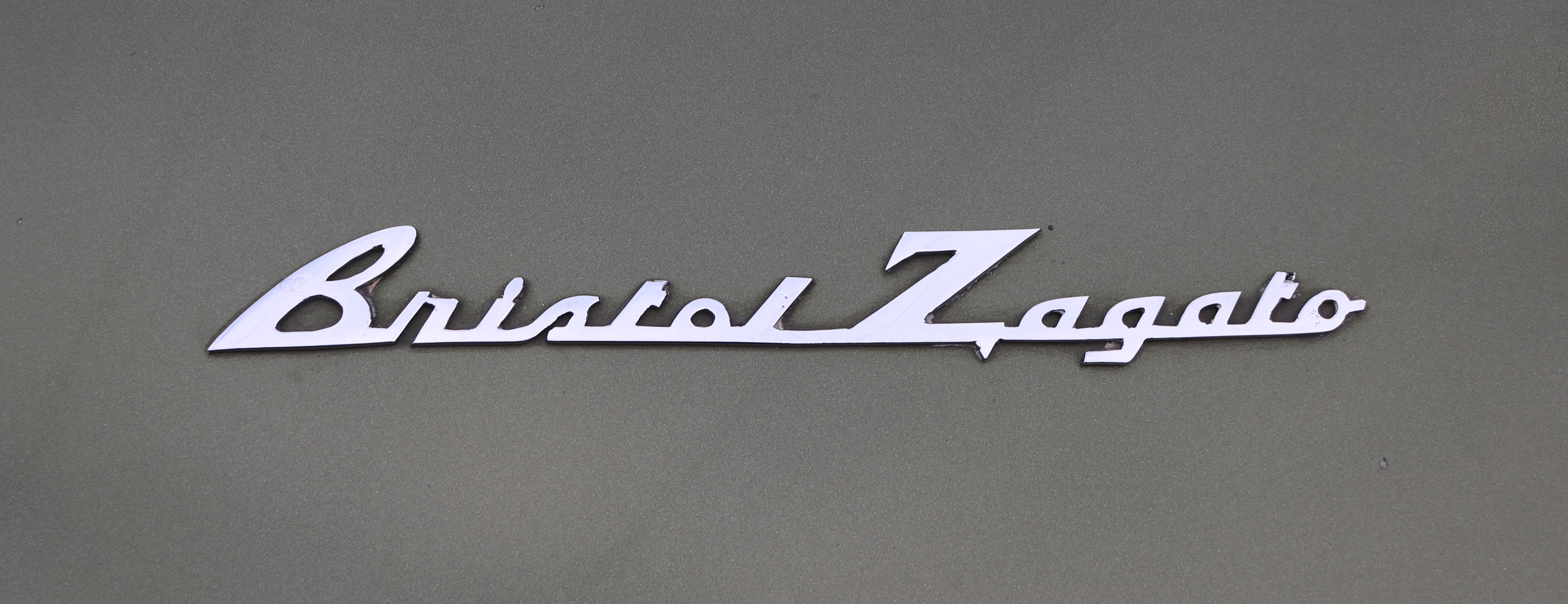
Zagato Badge

== Replacement ==
The engine's ageing design was dealt with in 1961 by replacing it with a 5-litre Chrysler V8. The resulting car was renamed Bristol 407.
