= Honda OSM =

Motor vehicle by Honda

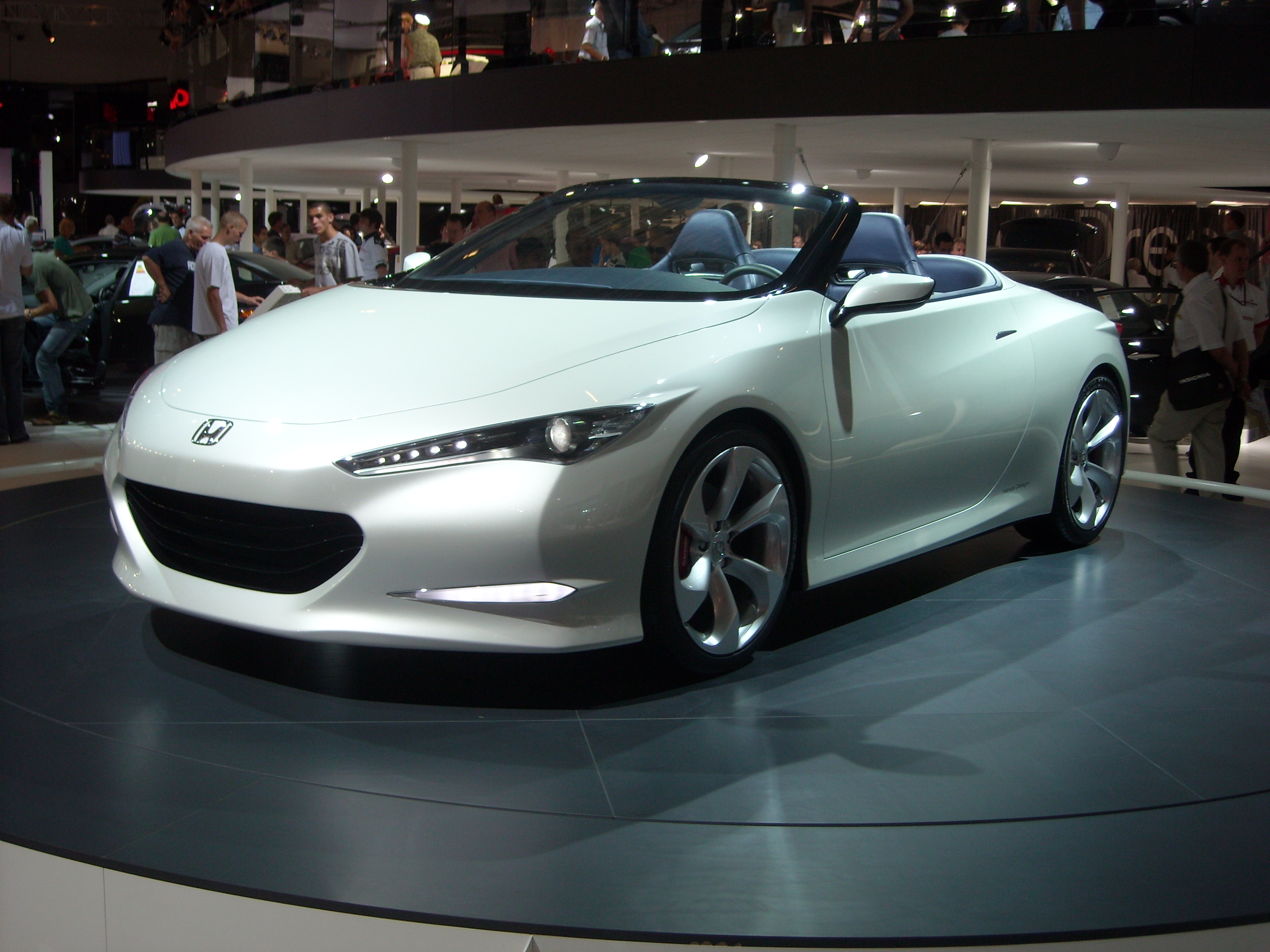

Overview
- Manufacturer: Honda
- Production: 2008
- Designer: Andreas Sittel

Body and chassis
- Class: Concept car
- Body style: 2-door roadster

The Honda OSM (Open Study Model) was a concept car that was revealed at the 2008 London Motor Show. The concept vehicle was designed by Honda's R&D facility in Offenbach, Germany. The lightweight roadster design was to showcase that Honda has the capability of producing a low-emissions car that is sporty and fun to drive. Honda has announced that it has no plan for the car to be released as a production model, despite being speculated by car enthusiasts as a preview for a potential replacement of the aging Honda S2000 convertible. It was also speculated that the similar size and design language hinted at a convertible version of the Honda CR-Z, which was then yet to be released.

== Design and features ==
The dashboard design concept was inspired by the Honda civic (eighth generation), more specifically the European hatchback model, and became a consistent design choice for later Honda sedan models in the following years such as the Honda Insight (second generation) in 2010 and Honda Civic (ninth generation) in 2011.

== Gallery ==
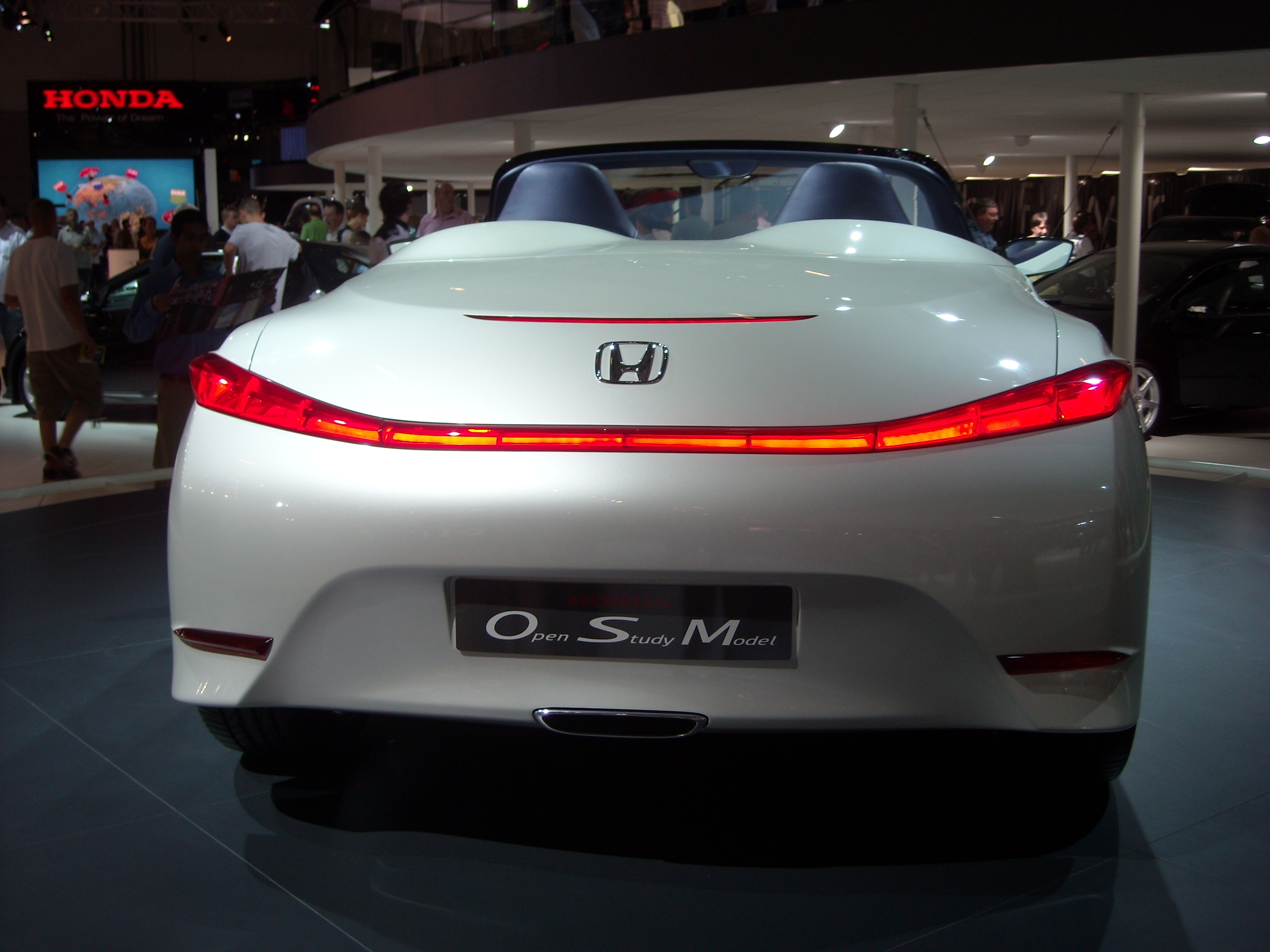
Rear view

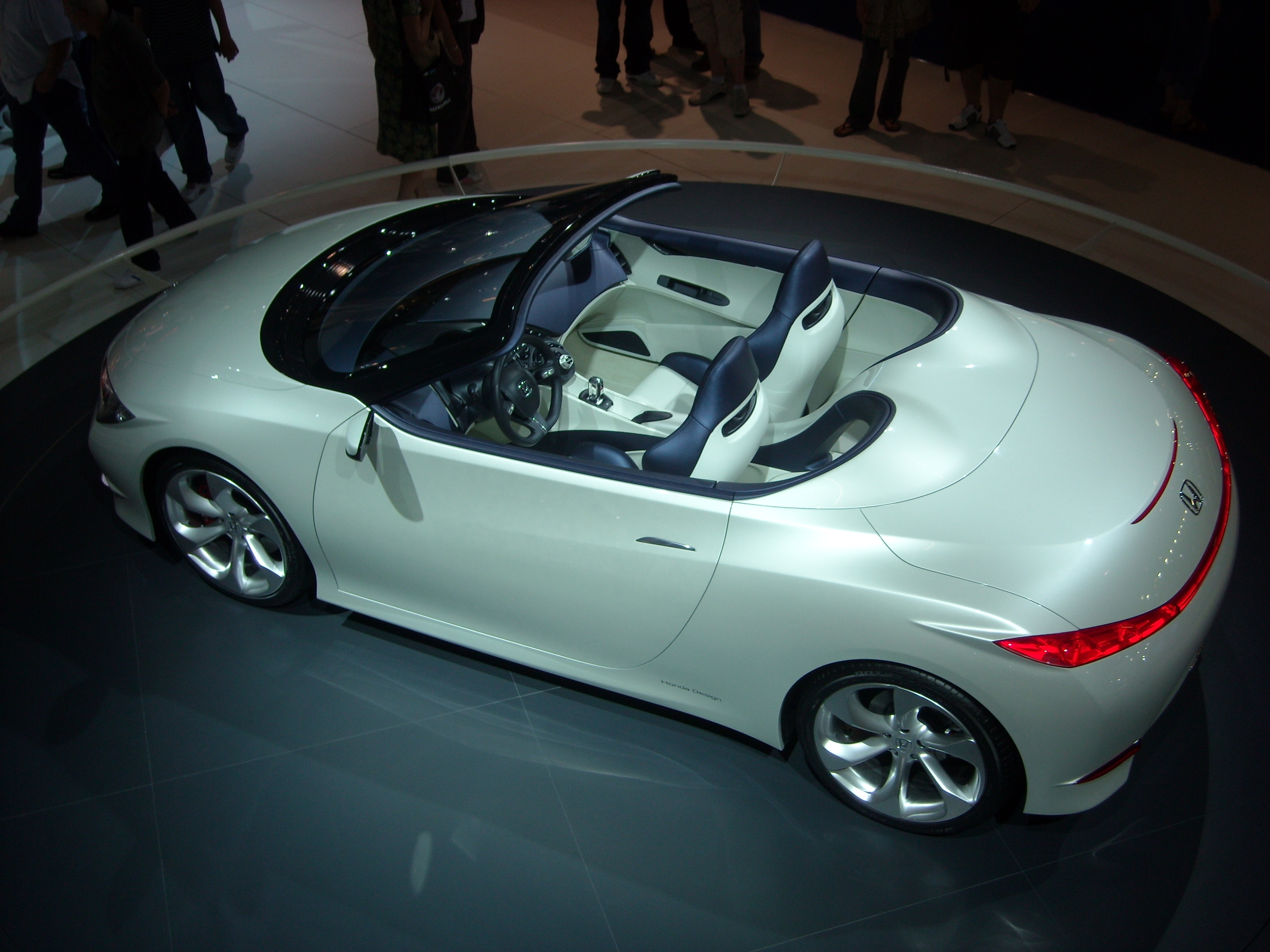
View from above
