= Lanchester Fourteen =

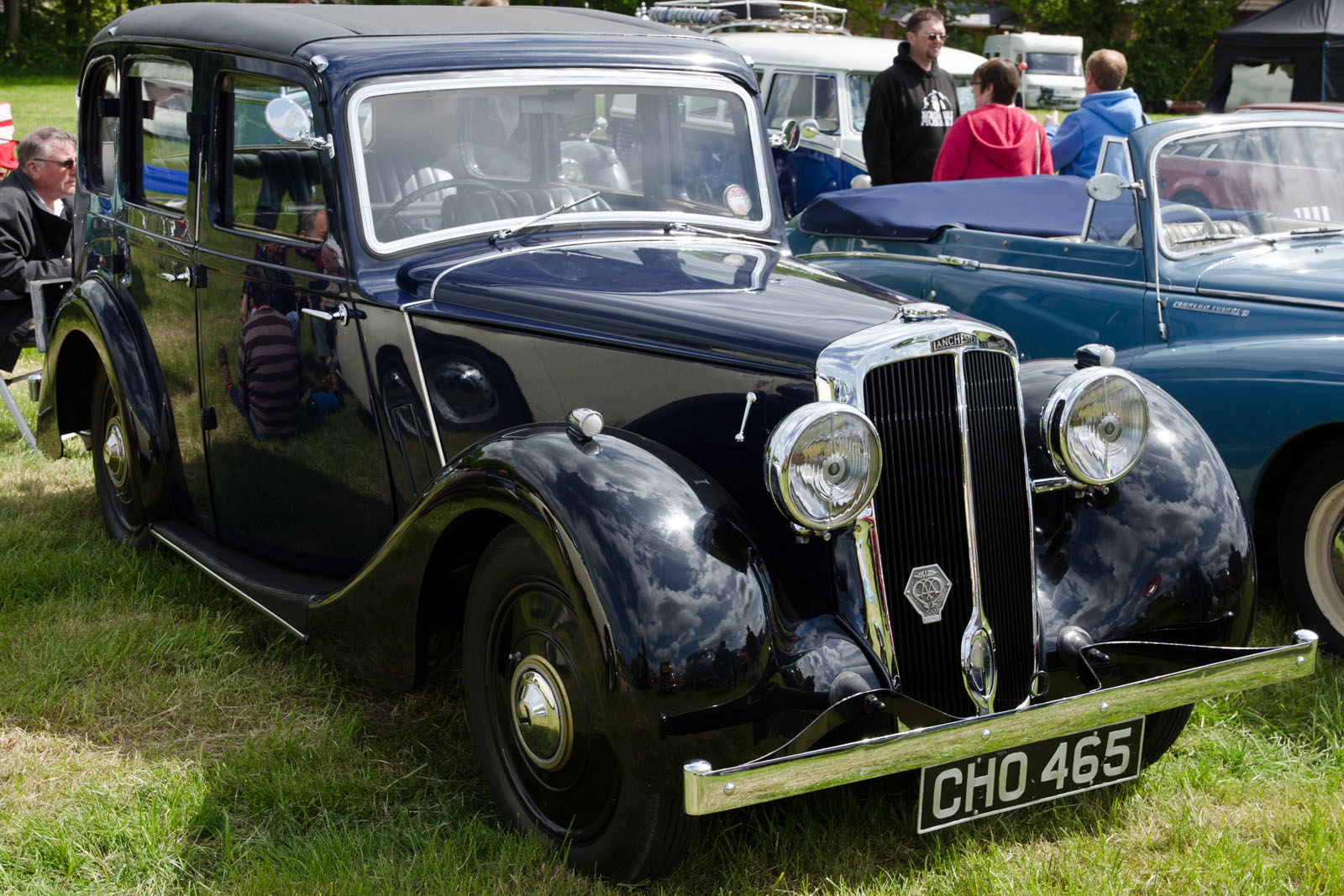
- Fourteen 6-light saloon

Overview
- Manufacturer: The Daimler Company Limited

Body and chassis
- Class: small luxury car
- Body style: 4-door six-light saloon 4-door four-light "razor-edge" sports saloon 2-door four-light four-seater coupé all with fully panelled or leathercloth roofs and quarters.
- Layout: FR layout
- Related: Lanchester Eleven

Powertrain
- Engine: 1,527 cc (93.2 cu in) 6-cylinder in-line ohv
- Transmission: 4-speed preselective self-changing gearbox and Fluid Flywheel

Dimensions
- Wheelbase: 102 1/2 in (2,600 mm) track 48 in (1,200 mm)
- Kerb weight: 25 long cwt (2,800 lb; 1,300 kg)

Chronology
- Predecessor: Lanchester Light Six
- Successor: Lanchester Fourteen

Lanchester Fourteen engine

Overview
- Manufacturer: The Daimler Company Limited

Layout
- Configuration: 6-cylinder in-line
- Displacement: 1,527 cc (93.2 cu in)
- Cylinder bore: 60 mm (2.4 in)
- Piston stroke: 90 mm (3.5 in)
- Compression ratio: 6.5:1

Combustion
- Cooling system: water, pump and fan, thermostatically controlled

Output
- Power output: 43 bhp (32 kW; 44 PS) @4,000 rpm Tax rating 13.4 hp (10.0 kW)

Chronology
- Predecessor: Lanchester Light Six
- Successor: Lanchester Fourteen

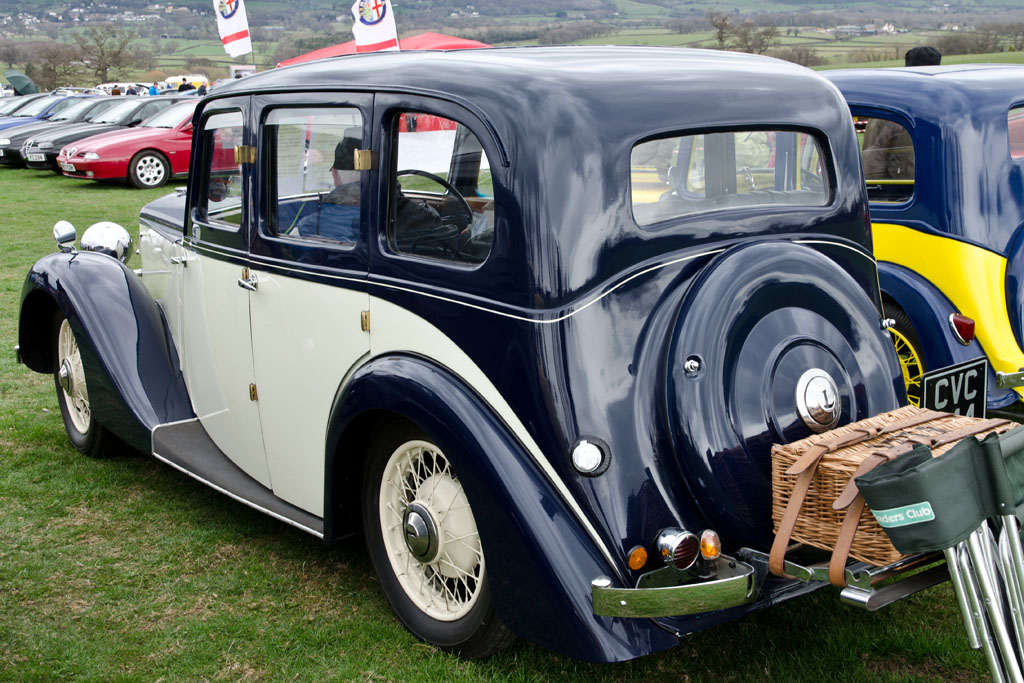
Roadrider 6-light 1937

The Lanchester Fourteen Roadrider is a six-cylinder automobile introduced by the Lanchester Motor Company in the beginning of September 1936. It was named "Roadrider" for its special suspension features, and billed as the lowest-priced six-cylinder Lanchester ever offered. This car replaced the previous 12 hp (tax horsepower) Light Six model with a larger six-cylinder (14 hp tax horsepower) engine again in the Lanchester Eleven chassis and body.

The four-light four-door sports saloon was given a new "razor edge" body. The entirely new Roadrider shape, introduced within twelve months, was similar in appearance.

The Fourteen was continued after World War II, with a coachbuilt body for the home market and, under the Lanchester Leda name for the export market, with a lighter all-steel body.

== Design and specifications ==
=== Chassis, engine, and transmission ===
These followed the customary Lanchester practice and the transmission included the Daimler fluid flywheel and the self-changing pre-selective four-speed gearbox. Final drive was by underslung worm gear.

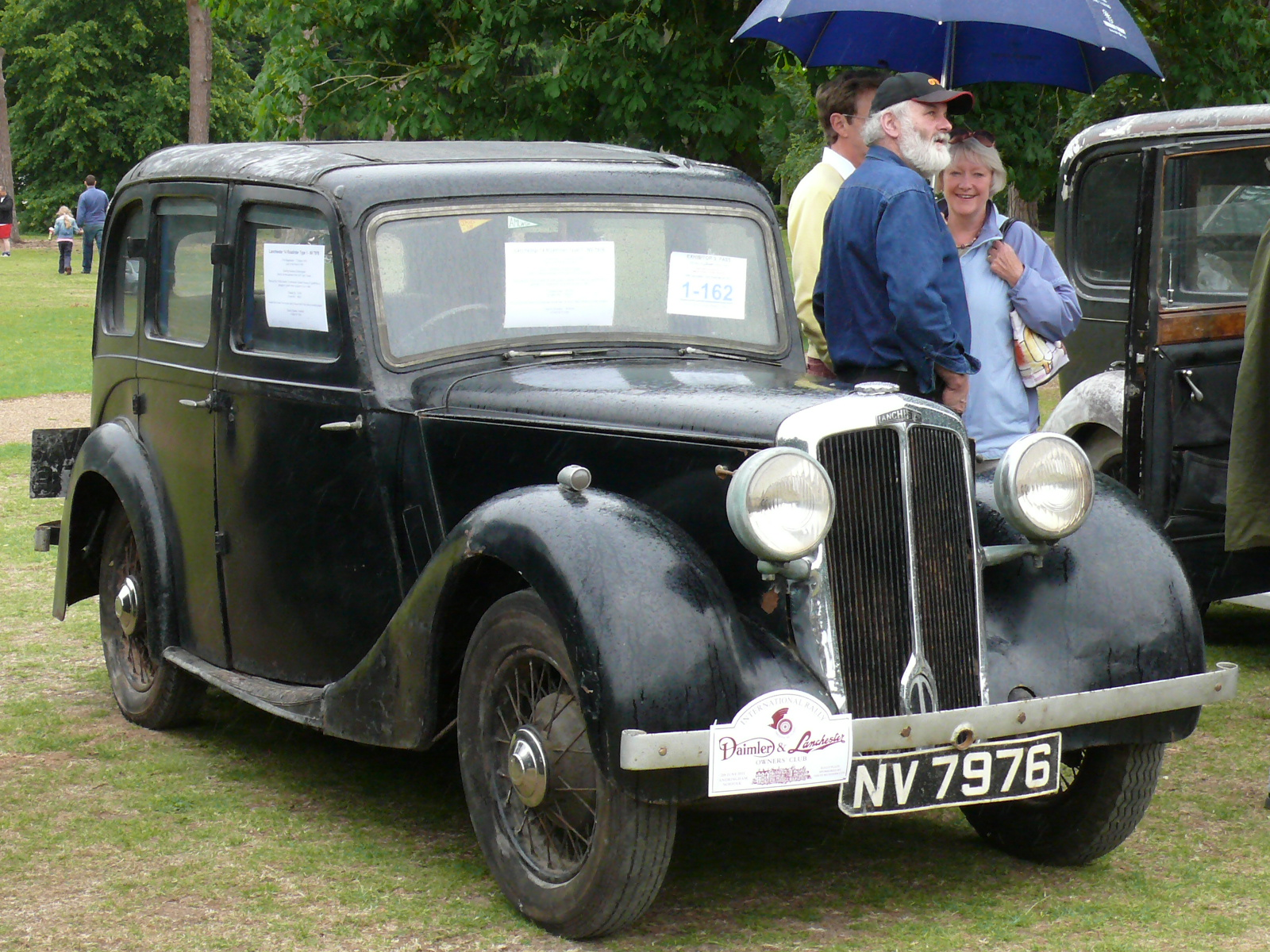
Lanchester 14 saloon 6-light 5917707813 760b3f7800 o

=== Standard body ===
Magna type wire wheels and fully chromium-plated bumpers were standard. There was a new range of coachwork. Upholstery was provided in a new style either in all leather or a combination of leather and cloth. The windscreen had remote-motor dual wipers operating from the bottom.

== Prices ==
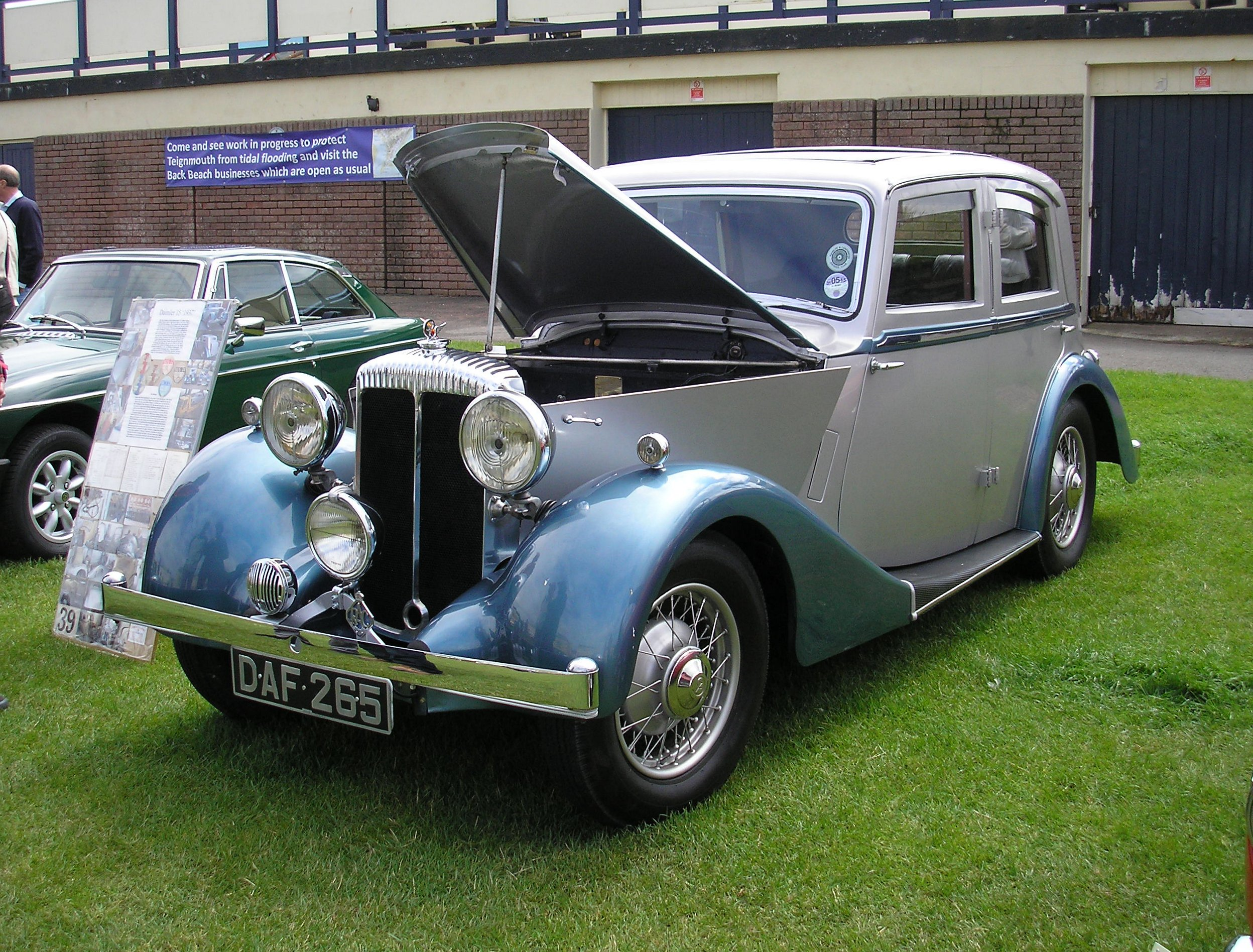
4-light razor-edge sports saloon (shown with the Daimler grille)

- chassis £250
- fabric topped saloon £325
- panelled topped saloon £330
- sports saloon £340
- coupé £330

== New Roadrider ==
Lanchester Fourteen Roadrider
- Roadrider 6-light saloon 1939

Overview
- Manufacturer: The Daimler Company Limited
- Production: 1937–1939
- Model years: 1938–1939
- Assembly: United Kingdom: Coventry

Body and chassis
- Class: medium size luxury car
- Body style: 4-door six-light saloon 4-door four-light sports saloon
- Layout: FR layout
- Related: Daimler New Fifteen

Powertrain
- Engine: 1,809 cc (110.4 cu in) 6-cylinder in-line ohv
- Transmission: 4-speed preselective self-changing gearbox and Fluid Flywheel

Dimensions
- Wheelbase: 110 in (2,800 mm) track 52 in (1,300 mm)
- Length: 180 in (4,600 mm)
- Width: 65 in (1,700 mm)
- Kerb weight: 27.5 long cwt (3,080 lb; 1,400 kg)

Chronology
- Predecessor: Lanchester Fourteen
- Successor: Lanchester Fourteen (post-war)

Lanchester Fourteen Roadrider engine

Overview
- Manufacturer: The Daimler Company Limited

Layout
- Configuration: 6-cylinder in-line
- Displacement: 1,809 cc (110.4 cu in)
- Cylinder bore: 61.47 mm (2.420 in)
- Piston stroke: 101.6 mm (4.00 in)
- Cylinder block material: cast iron
- Valvetrain: OHV pushrod cam-in-block
- Compression ratio: 6.5:1

Combustion
- Fuel system: carburettor
- Fuel type: petrol supplied by mechanical pump
- Cooling system: water, pump and fan, thermostatically controlled

Output
- Power output: 52 bhp (39 kW; 53 PS) @4,200 rpm, Tax rating 14.06

A new Lanchester Roadrider "breaking fresh and important ground" was announced at the beginning of October 1937. Engine, chassis, and body were all different, and larger and independent front suspension was now provided. An optional manual synchromesh gearbox with an ordinary clutch was also available at reduced price. This car was a simpler, less luxurious version of the Daimler New Fifteen, sharing the two standard bodies but using a smaller engine.

=== Design and specifications (Mark II) ===
details in addition to tabled data

==== Engine (Mark II) ====
The crankshaft ran in four bearings The engine unit had bi-axial four-point rubber mountings.

"On the offside are the horizontal carburettor, the manifolds held by brass nuts, the air-cooled dynamo with a belt drive common to the combined fan and impeller and the steering box which has worm and double roller gear.

On the nearside the vertically driven make-and-break and distributor is placed centrally and has a neat easily detachable cover over the top which also hides the sparking plugs and wiring. Here also are the water tap, the coil, pressure oil filter, dip rod, sump drain plug, starter and mechanical fuel pump"

==== Transmission (Mark II) ====
Power was transmitted to the rear wheels with the usual Daimler fluid flywheel and self-changing gearbox but the final drive was now by spiral bevel. A pin roller-bearing propeller-shaft led to a half-floating spiral bevel driven back axle.

==== Chassis (Mark II) ====
Independent front wheel springing was provided in the form of parallel links with coil springs, radius arms and torsion bar damping. The rear half-elliptical springs also were given a torsion bar stabilizer and hydraulic shock absorbers. They were rubber-mounted to minimise vibration. The exhaust system was also insulated.

Wheelbase and track had been extended by 7.5 in (191 mm) and 4 in (102 mm) respectively, providing more body space and inter-axle seating. Steering was now by worm and double roller.

Tyres 5.75 x 16 inches.

Bendix mechanical brakes were on all four wheels.

==== Standard body (Mark II) ====
The radiator case was carried well forward of the front axle which lengthened the bonnet and, with the sweeping lines of the body, gave a big car appearance. "Easy clean" wheels were fitted, the front seats were adjustable, and the steering wheel column was telescopic.

A luggage boot was added at the back with a separate lockable compartment for a spare wheel. Other additions were footrests for the back passengers, an electric cigarette lighter, a sunshine roof, double screen wipers, sun visors, and a new pistol-grip handbrake lever on the dash.

=== Performance (Mark II) ===
Lanchester estimated the fuel consumption to be 22 mpg. Maximum speed 70 mph.

=== Prices (Mark II) ===
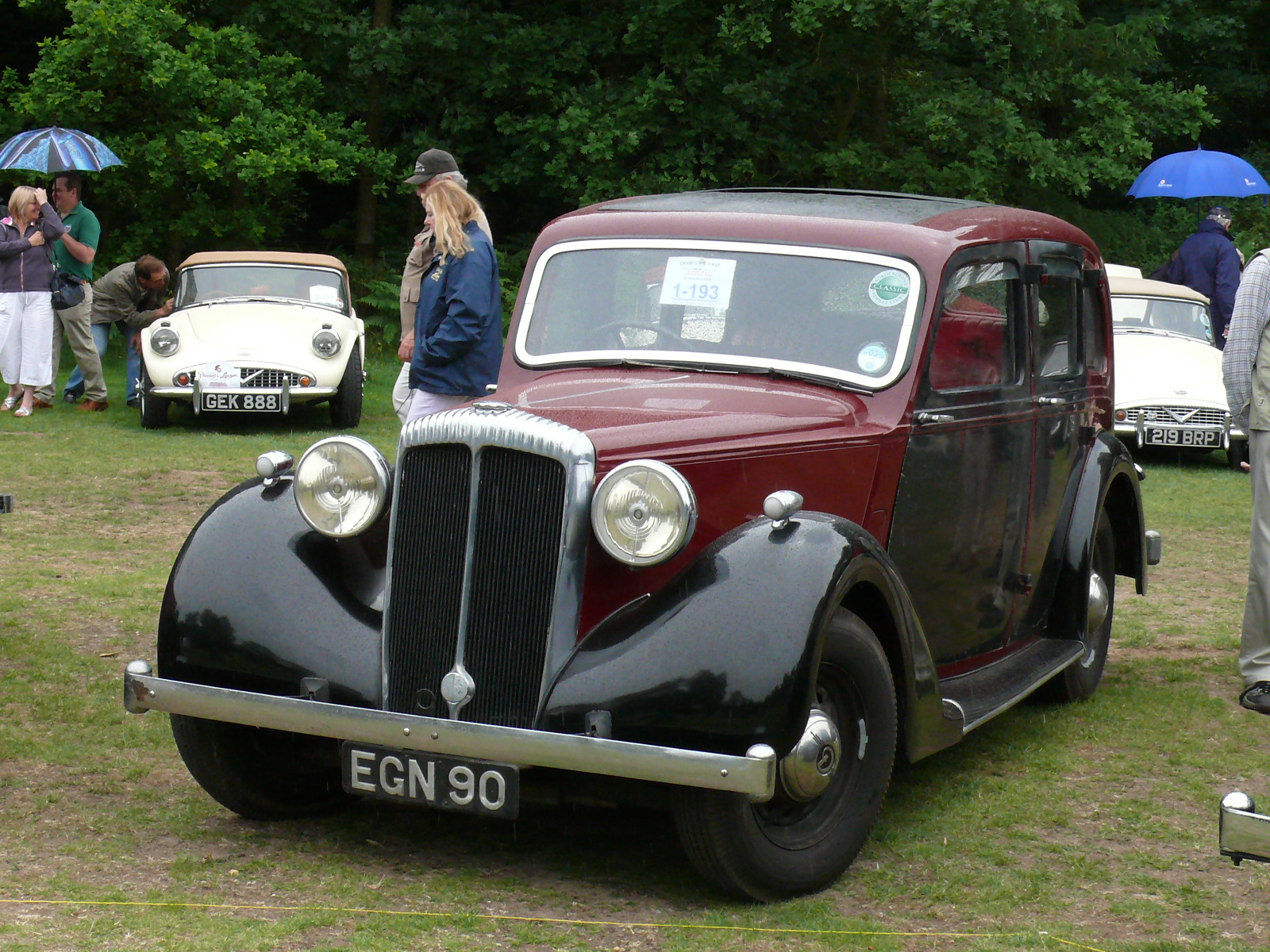
Roadrider 6-light saloon (illustrated with Daimler grille, 1937)

- saloon £375
- sports saloon £375

either car might be had with four-speed synchromesh gearbox and friction clutch for £350

== Post-war Fourteen and Leda ==
Lanchester Fourteen and Leda LJ200
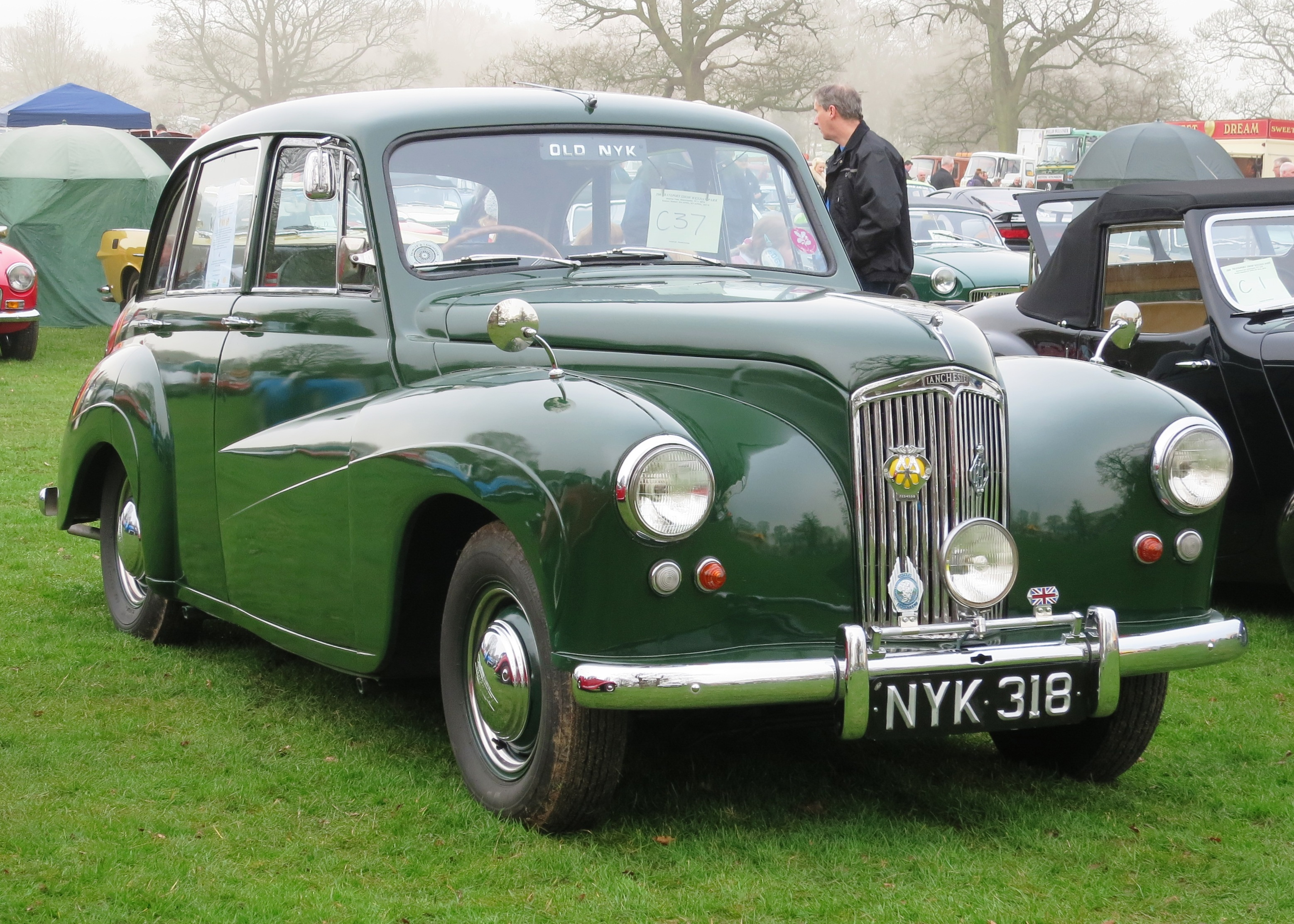
- 1953 Lanchester Fourteen

Overview
- Manufacturer: The Daimler Company Limited
- Model years: 1950–1953
- Assembly: United Kingdom: Coventry

Body and chassis
- Class: small luxury car
- Body style: 4-door six-light saloon (coachbuilt = Fourteen) (all-steel = Leda); 2-door drophead coupé
- Layout: FR layout
- Related: Daimler Conquest

Powertrain
- Engine: 1,968 cc (120.1 cu in) 4-cylinder in-line ohv
- Transmission: 4-speed preselective self-changing gearbox and Fluid Flywheel

Dimensions
- Wheelbase: 104 in (2,600 mm) track 52 in (1,300 mm)
- Length: 175 1/2 in (4,460 mm)
- Width: 66 in (1,700 mm)
- Kerb weight: 28 long cwt (3,100 lb; 1,400 kg)

Chronology
- Predecessor: Lanchester Fourteen Roadrider
- Successor: none, Sprite withdrawn

Lanchester Fourteen and Leda engine

Overview
- Manufacturer: The Daimler Company Limited

Layout
- Configuration: 4-cylinder in-line
- Displacement: 1,968 cc (120.1 cu in)
- Cylinder bore: 76.2 mm (3.00 in)
- Piston stroke: 107.95 mm (4.250 in)
- Cylinder block material: cast iron
- Valvetrain: OHV pushrod cam-in-block
- Compression ratio: 6.7:1

Combustion
- Fuel system: Zenith downdraught carburettor
- Fuel type: petrol supplied by AC mechanical pump
- Oil system: submerged gear type pump, Tecalemit full-flow oil filter with safety by-pass
- Cooling system: water, pump and fan, thermostatically controlled

Output
- Power output: 60 bhp (45 kW; 61 PS) @4,200 rpm

The new Lanchester Fourteen was displayed to the press on 9 October 1950, the day before the public announcement. The only familiar feature was the fluid flywheel and pre-selective gearbox. It was planned that, when the factory space destroyed in the Coventry raids was completed, the coachbuilt body would be replaced with an all-steel body which would reduce the car's weight, enable a price reduction, and permit shipment in a form suitable for assembly overseas. The Times regarded the new car's only features of technical interest to be the laminated leaves (usually bars) of the front suspension's springing and the automatic lubrication every time the car was started and warmed up. Aside from the front suspension, the new chassis differed little from its pre-war version. The engine was new, a 1968 cc four replacing the 1809 cc six.

=== Design and specifications (post-war) ===
details in addition to tabled data

==== Engine (post-war) ====
The engine was flexibly mounted to isolate torque reactions. It was fitted with a statically and dynamically balanced three bearing crankshaft; big ends fitted with steel-backed white-metal liners; three bearing camshaft with steel-backed white-metal liners; air silencer; and automatic advance and vacuum control of the distributor with over-riding hand adjustment for varying grades of fuel.

==== Transmission (post-war) ====
The usual Daimler transmission with fluid flywheel and pre-selective 4-speed epicyclic gearbox was provided. Hardy Spicer open propeller shaft with needle roller universal joint and hypoid bevel rear axle linked the engine and rear wheels.

==== Chassis (post-war) ====
The frame was of box section and cruciform braced. Suspension was independent in front using laminated torsion bars with a torsional stabilising bar. At the rear there were half-elliptic springs. Girling hydraulic shock absorbers and Girling hydro-mechanical brakes were fitted.

Disc type bolt-on wheels were fitted with 6.7" x 15" low pressure cushion tyres.

==== Standard body (post-war) ====
The post-war Fourteen had an entirely new coachbuilt body. When supplied for export with the lighter all-steel body, the car was known as the Lanchester Leda.

=== Price (post-war) ===
Standard coachbuilt 4-door six-light body £895

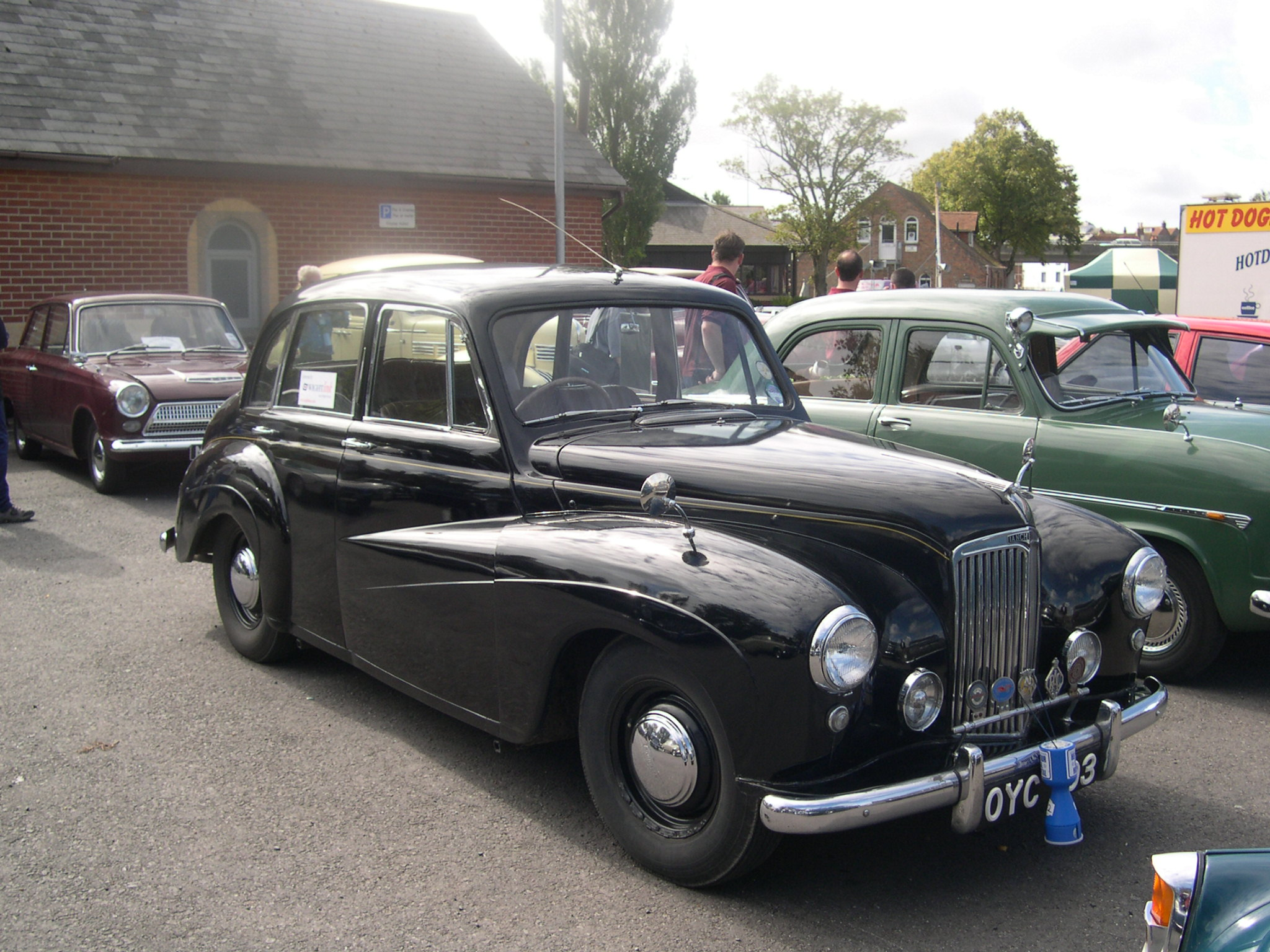
1953 Lanchester Leda
