= Kia Kee =

2007 South Korean concept car

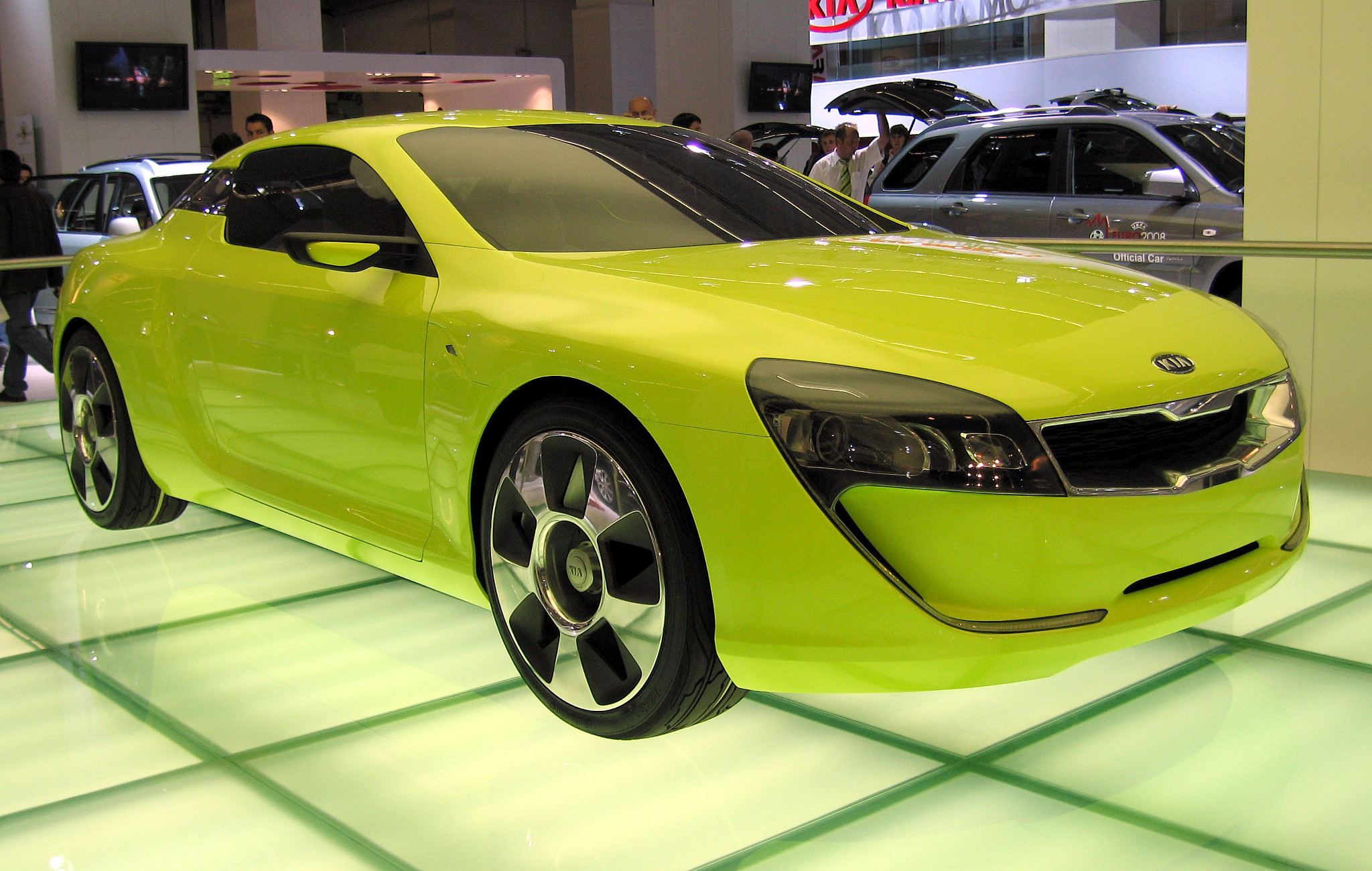
Kia KEE

The Kia Kee was a South Korean concept car designed by Peter Schreyer for Kia Motors.

== Basic Info ==
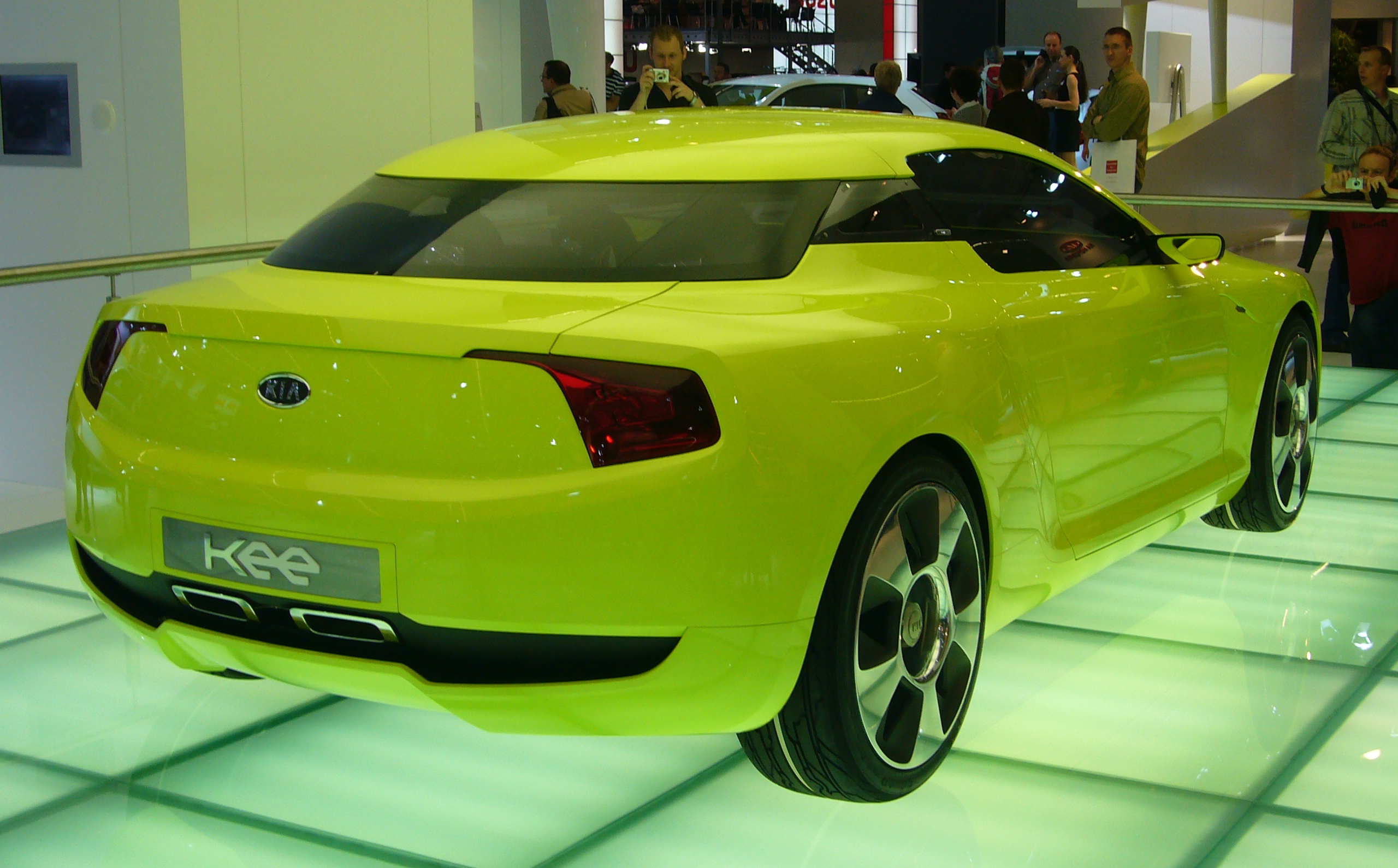
Rear end

The Kia Kee coupe concept was a compact, rear-driven, affordable production sports car, which was based on Hyundai recycled platform technology, it was first revealed at the 2007 Frankfurt Motor Show, in 2007. The Kee was heavily damaged while on its way to the LA Auto Show after it broke free of its cargo restraints and smashed its front end. It was shipped back to Italy for repairs.

== Styling ==
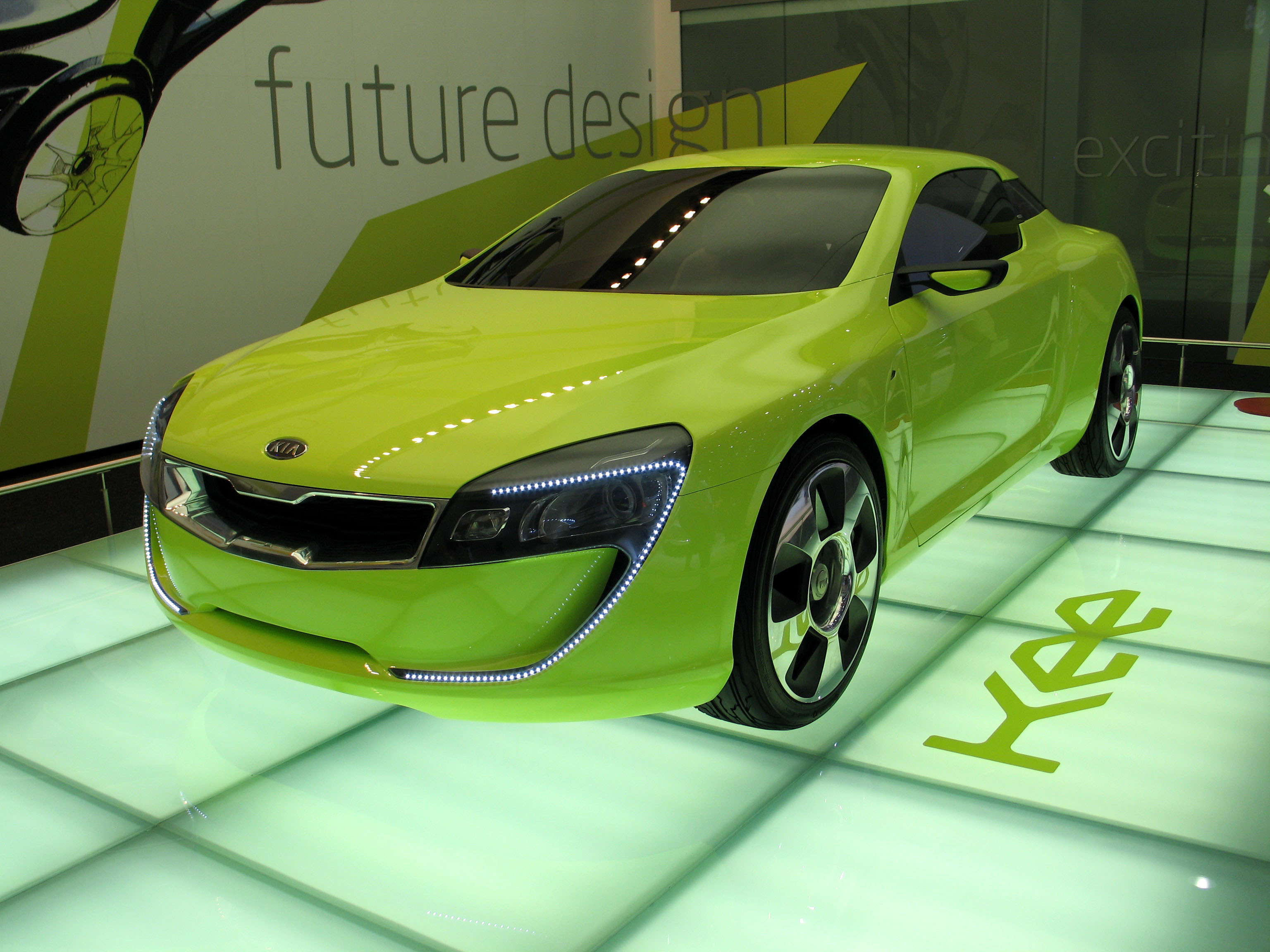
With the front lights on

The Kee was one of the first Kia vehicles along with the Kia Soul to have the tiger nose design. It was a 4.3 meter long car which was a 4-seater, 2-door coupe. It used light-weight aluminium or plastic panels and components wherever possible in order to reduce weight and further improve performance.

== Engine ==
The Kee was powered by a ‘next generation’ 2-litre, V-6 gasoline engine producing 200 hp (149 kW), mated to a six-speed automatic transmission, sending power to the front wheels.
