= Jensen 541 =

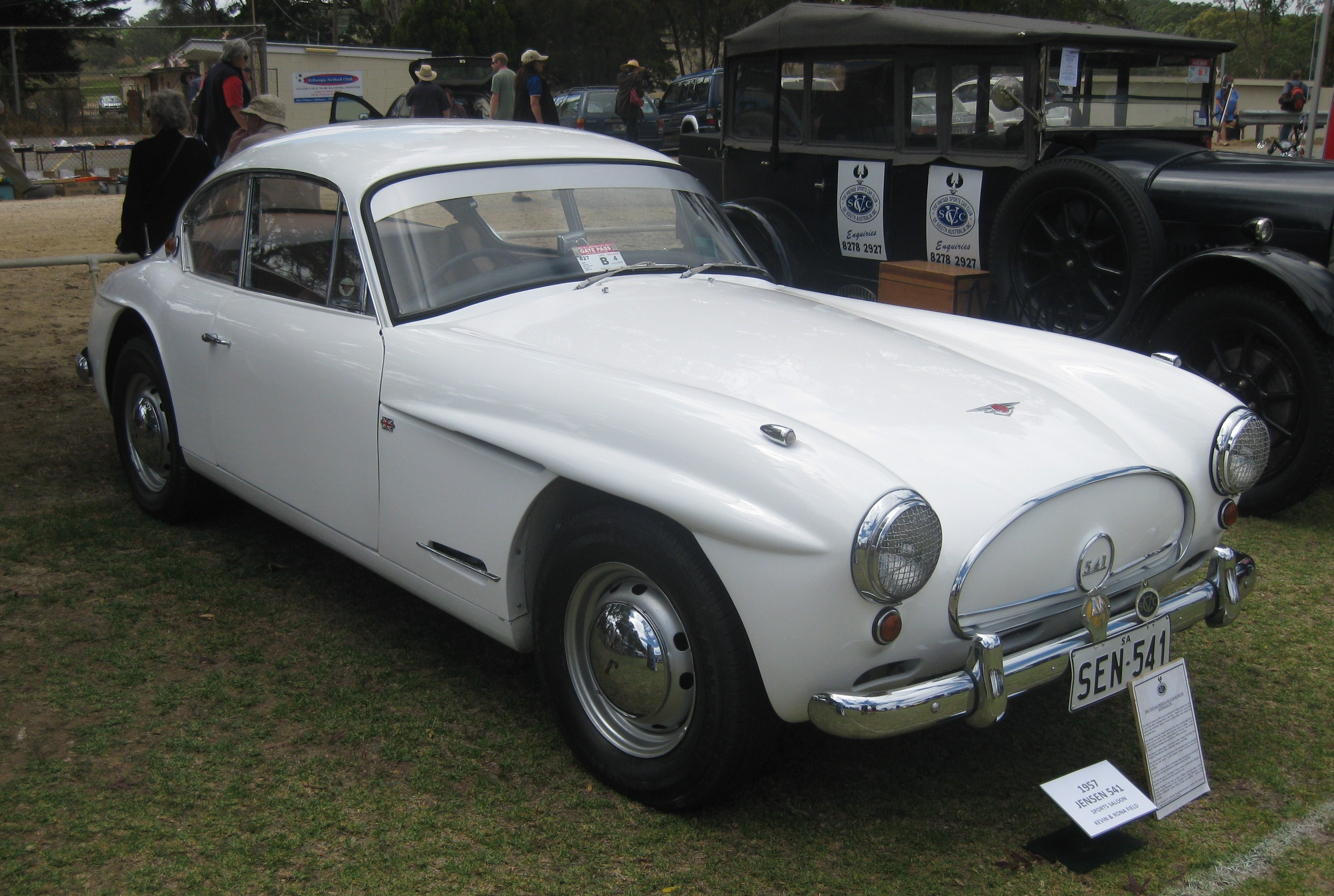
- Jensen 541 Deluxe of 1957

Overview
- Manufacturer: Jensen
- Production: 1954–1959; 226 made
- Designer: Eric Neale

Body and chassis
- Class: Grand tourer
- Body style: 2-door, 4-seat coupé

Powertrain
- Engine: 4.0 L Austin D-Series I6
- Transmission: 4-speed manual

Dimensions
- Wheelbase: 105 in (2,667 mm)
- Length: 176 in (4,470 mm)
- Width: 63 in (1,600 mm)
- Height: 54 in (1,372 mm)
- Kerb weight: 1,220 kg (2,690 lb)

Chronology
- Predecessor: Jensen Interceptor
- Successor: Jensen 541R

The Jensen 541 is an automobile which was produced by Jensen Motors from 1954 to 1959. It was first exhibited at the London Motor Show in October 1953, and production started in 1954.

The 541 used fibreglass bodywork mounted on a steel chassis. It was fitted with a 4-litre Austin D-Series engine with three SU carburettors, mated to a four-speed manual transmission with optional Laycock de Normanville overdrive.

The body consisted of three major mouldings. The entire front was rear-hinged and could be raised for engine access. The doors were aluminium. Suspension was independent at the front using coil springs, with a Panhard rod located rigid axle and leaf springs at the rear. A choice of wire-spoked or steel disc wheels with centre lock fitting was offered. Early cars had servo assisted 11 in (279 mm) drum brakes but from 1956 on, the newly introduced 541 Deluxe version featured Dunlop disc brakes both front and rear—the first British four seater thus equipped.

It was considered a luxurious car, with leather seats as standard. The individual seats in front were separated by a high transmission tunnel, and the rear seats had a small centre armrest and could be tilted forwards to increase luggage space. Standard colours (1955) were black, ivory, imperial crimson, moonbeam grey, Boticelli blue, deep green and Tampico beige.

By employing lightweight materials, Jensen managed to make the car significantly lighter than its contemporary Interceptor model, with a dry weight of 1,220 kg (2,690 lb), against the older design's 1,370 kg (3,020 lb). Performance benefitted.

In 1957, the 541 R was introduced, and in 1960, the 541 S arrived with wider bodywork and revised grille styling. Production of the Jensen 541 ended in 1959, and the 541 S early in 1963 when the range was replaced by the C-V8.

== Performance ==
The Jensen 541 was a fast car with a claimed 135 bhp (101 kW) and top speed of 109 mph (175 km/h) (both subsequently increased) at launch.

A car with overdrive tested by the British magazine The Motor in 1955 had a top speed of 115.8 mph (186.4 km/h) and could accelerate from 0-60 mph (97 km/h) in 10.8 seconds. A fuel consumption of 20.6 miles per imperial gallon (13.7 L/100 km; 17.2 mpg_{‑US}) was recorded. The test car cost £2146 (with the optional overdrive) including taxes. In 1957 Richard Jensen had a 541 deluxe built with a Chrysler Hemi engine but no performance or fuel consumption figures are known for this vehicle.

The basic car cost £1821.

== Drophead coupés by Abbott of Farnham ==
Two 541s were converted into drophead coupés by Abbott of Farnham.

== Gallery ==
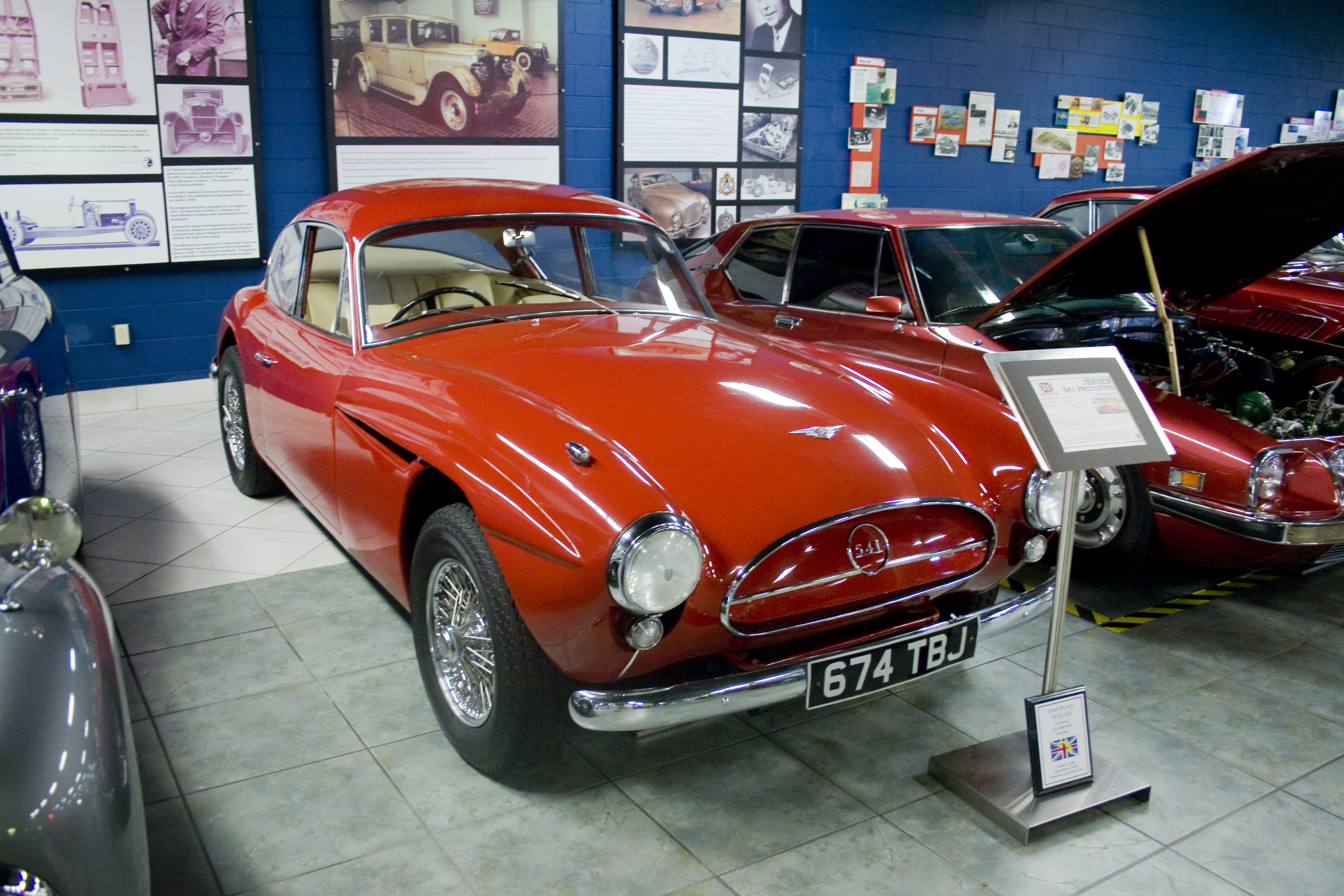
Jensen 541 prototype with aluminum bodywork

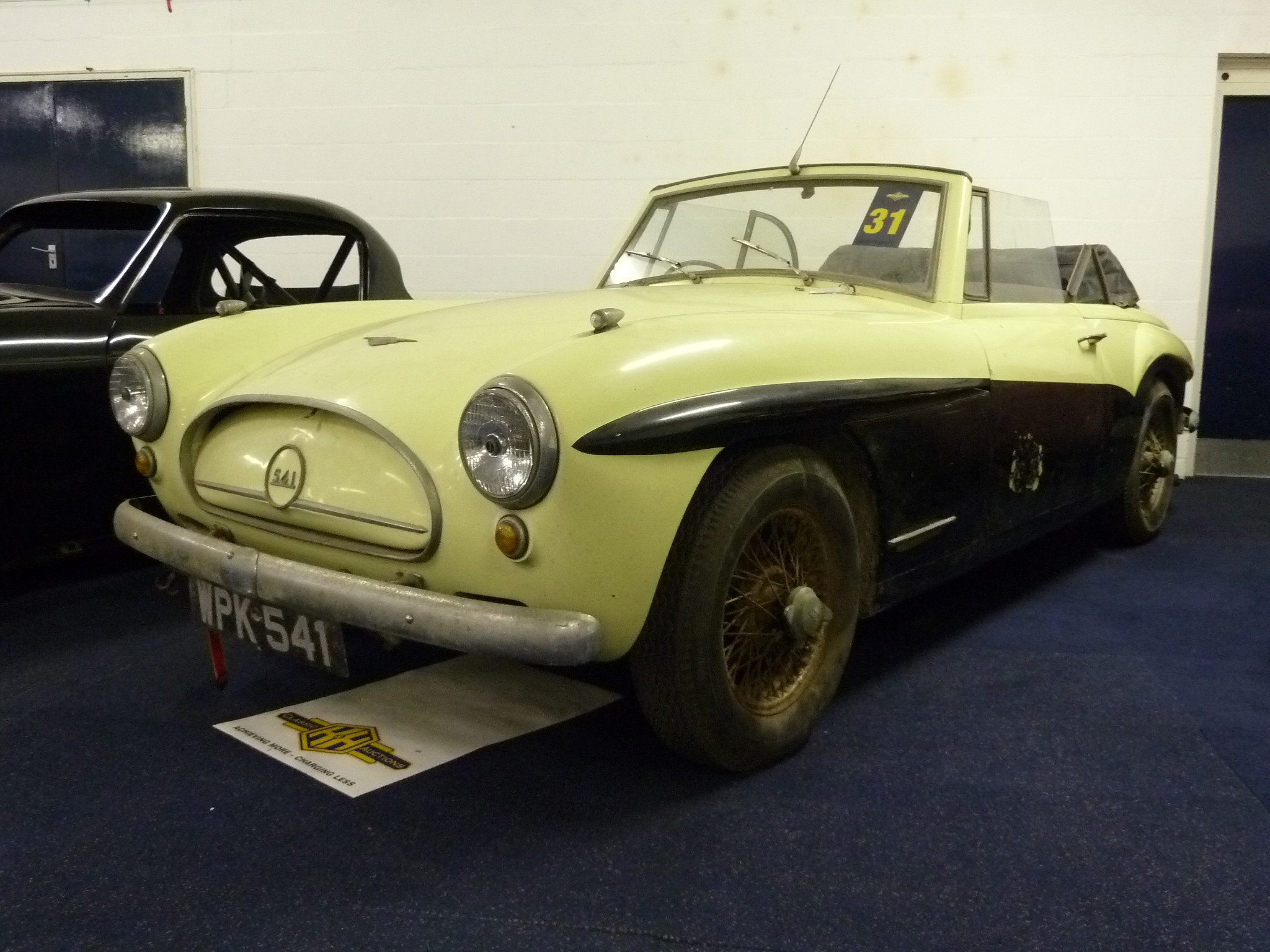
One of the two Jensen 541s converted into drophead coupés by Abbott of Farnham

== See also ==
- Jensen 541R
- Jensen 541S
