= Jensen 541R =

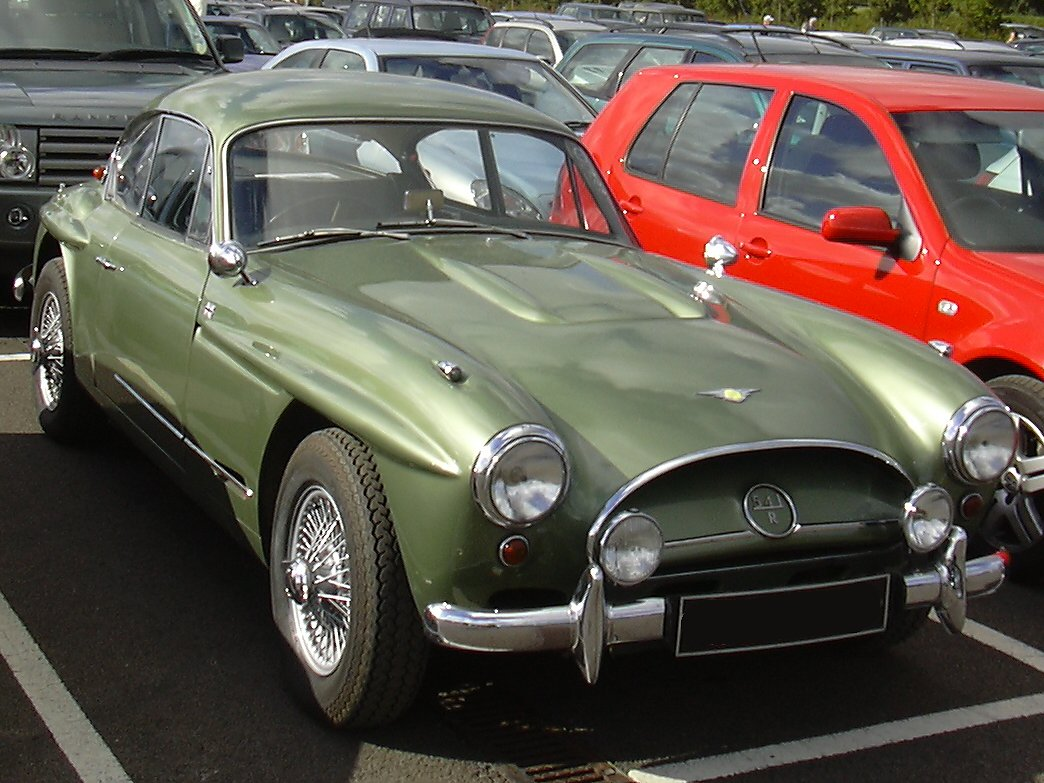

Overview
- Manufacturer: Jensen
- Production: 1957–1960; 193 made
- Designer: Eric Neale

Body and chassis
- Class: Grand tourer
- Body style: 2-door, 4-seat coupé

Powertrain
- Engine: 4.0 L Austin D-series I6
- Transmission: 4-speed manual

Dimensions
- Wheelbase: 105 in (2,667 mm)
- Length: 176 in (4,470 mm)
- Width: 63 in (1,600 mm)

Chronology
- Predecessor: Jensen 541
- Successor: Jensen 541S

The Jensen 541R is a closed four-seater GT-class car built in the United Kingdom by Jensen between 1957 and 1960.

The original aluminium prototype appeared in 1953 as the 541 at the London Motor Show, but production cars used glassfibre. Within a year, the new 541 had earned rave reviews from magazines, notably Autocar, whose testers drove the grand tourer to a top speed of over 125 mph (201 km/h). It was the fastest four-seater the magazine had ever tested at the time.

The 541R employed a low-revving 4.0 L (3,993 cc; 243.7 cu in) Austin D-Series straight-six engine from the Austin Sheerline. The suspension system came from the Austin A70, with independent suspension at the front via coil springs and a live axle with semi-elliptic springs at the rear. The 541R, introduced in 1957, differed from the 541 by using rack-and-pinion steering instead of a cam-and-roller system and large disc brakes on all four wheels.

The car's styling was by Jensen designer Eric Neale, and was not only considered attractive but also aerodynamically efficient; a Cd figure of only 0.39 was recorded, which became the lowest at Jensen. The body covered a chassis built by bracing 5-inch (12.7 cm) tubes with a mixture of steel pressings and cross-members, creating a platform.

The 1957 model carried the DS7 version of the Austin Sheerline's four-litre motor equipped with twin carburetors on its right side. The cylinder head was reworked for the increased compression ratio of 7.6:1 and a "long dwell". Engine output was raised to 150 hp (112 kW) at 4100 rpm and 210 lb⋅ft (285 N⋅m). Only 53 cars were built with the engine.

Jensen built 193 541Rs before it was succeeded by the Jensen 541S in 1961. The 541S was similar to the 541R, but with a larger body and a GM-licensed Rolls-Royce hydramatic gearbox. Only 127 cars were built before that model was discontinued, to be replaced by the Jensen C-V8.

== Performance ==
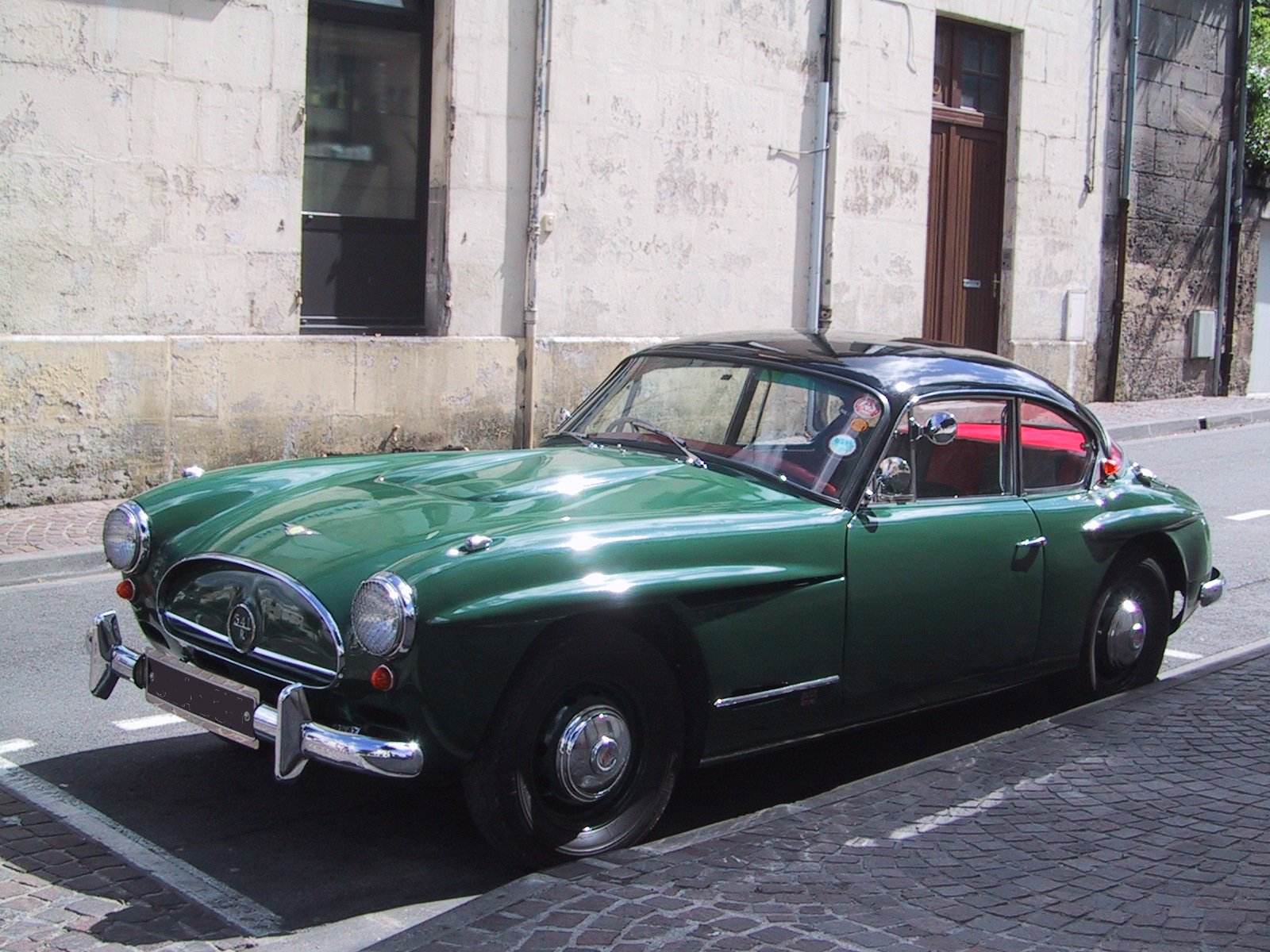
Jensen 541R

When the Jensen 541R was tested by Autocar magazine in January 1958 it achieved their highest maximum speed for a four-seater car at 127.5 mph (205.2 km/h). It was conducted in below-freezing conditions with a "stiff diagonal breeze". 0–60 mph was recorded at 10.6 seconds with fuel consumption at 18 mpg_{‑imp} (16 L/100 km; 15 mpg_{‑US}) overall, with the normal range given as 15–24 mpg_{‑imp} (19–12 L/100 km; 12–20 mpg_{‑US}).
