= Jensen 541S =

Jensen 541 S
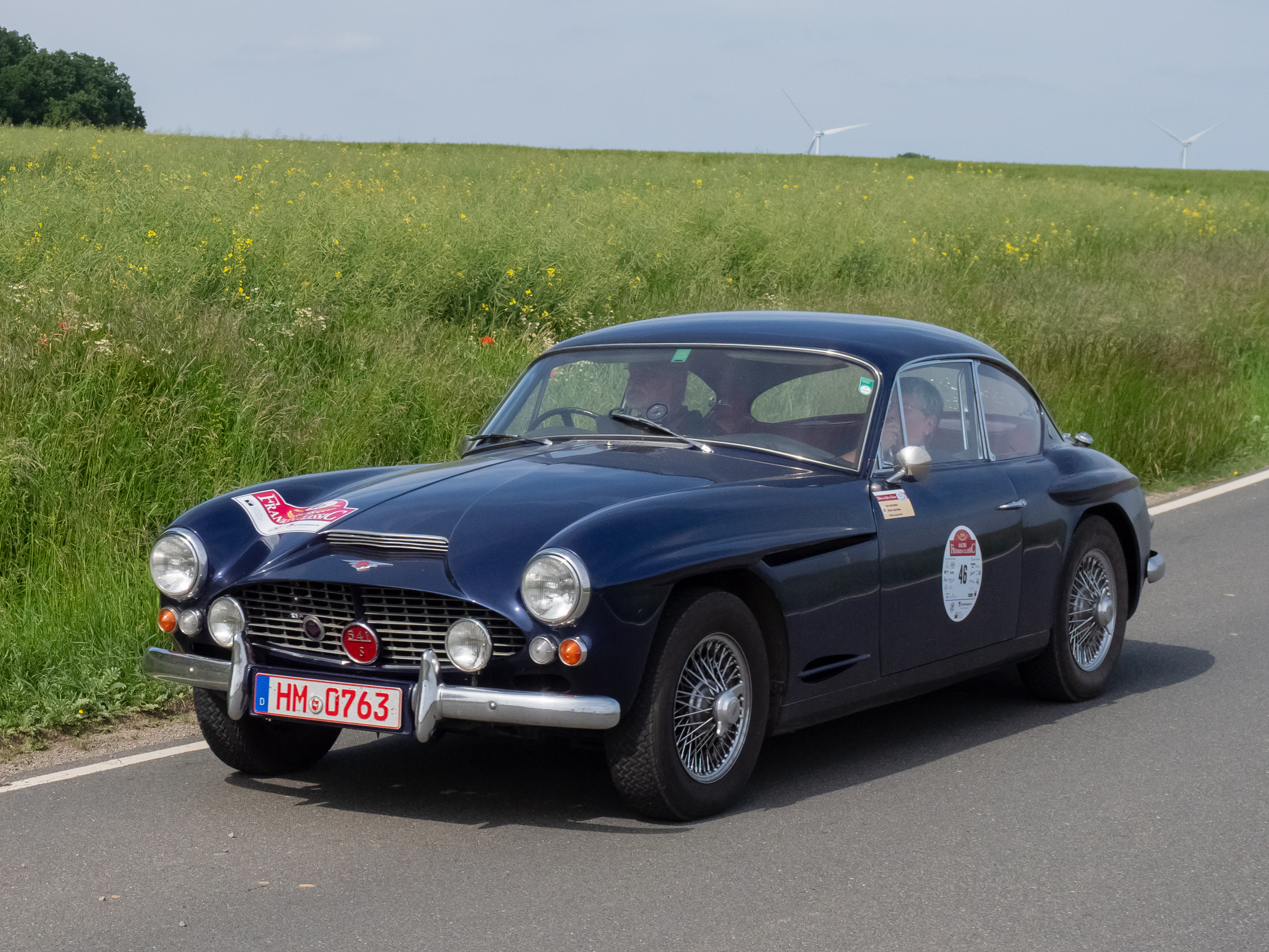

Overview
- Manufacturer: Jensen Motors Limited
- Production: 1960–1963; 127 made
- Designer: Eric Neale

Body and chassis
- Class: Grand tourer

Powertrain
- Engine: 4.0 L Austin I6; 5358 cc V8
- Transmission: 4-speed automatic 4-speed manual + overdrive

Dimensions
- Wheelbase: 105 in (2,667 mm)
- Length: 178 in (4,521 mm)
- Width: 67 in (1,702 mm)

Chronology
- Predecessor: Jensen 541R
- Successor: Jensen C-V8

The Jensen 541S was Jensen Motors luxury GT model of the Jensen 541. Announced in mid-October 1960, the Jensen 541S was four inches wider than the 541R. The increased track allowed the new car's interior to be roomier and improved the roadholding. The 541S had a conventional radiator grille (as opposed to the flap of the 541), and a Salisbury limited-slip differential for extra traction.

Jensen used their own powerful version of the Austin DS5 4-litre straight-six engine , featuring triple H4 type SU carburettors, a high compression Weslake head with custom-made twin exhaust manifolds and an alloy baffled sump/oil cooler in the 541S. (although one was fitted with a Chevrolet 327 V8 at Donald Healey's request.)

A total of 127 cars were hand-built between 1960 and 1962 at Jensen's West Bromwich factory, most having GM-licensed Rolls-Royce hydramatic gearboxes. This was innovative at the time, as performance cars mainly had manual gearboxes. It also met the criteria of effortless speed and luxurious long-distance driving that Jensen set for their new car, although twenty-two were fitted with Moss manual gearboxes at the request of their prospective owners.

The Jensen 541S is notable for being the first British car to have seat belts fitted as standard equipment. Another first for the 541 series was the use of Dunlop disc brakes on all four wheels. A rack and pinion steering system was employed, giving the car very positive steering. Other safety equipment included a padded windscreen surround, fire extinguisher, and first-aid kit. Each car was also fitted with a Motorola radio.

The 541 S was superseded by the Chrysler Golden Commando V8 powered Jensen C-V8 model, which inherited from the 541 S the same wheelbase and track dimensions, as well as the Jensen ethos of safe, easy, comfortable and fast inter-continental travel while the groundbreaking 1966 Jensen FF used a perimeter tube style chassis first tried on the 541 series of cars.

== Gallery ==
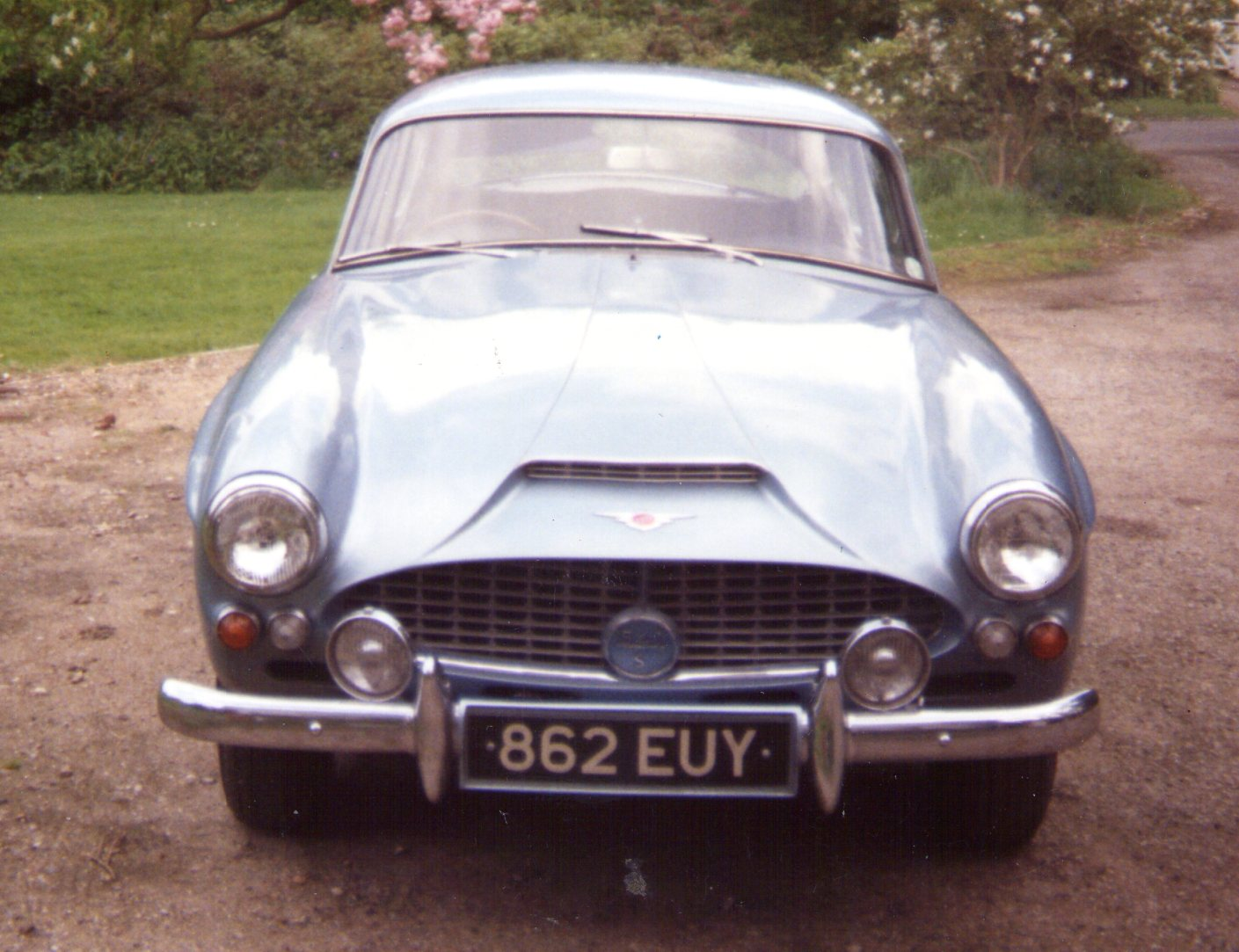

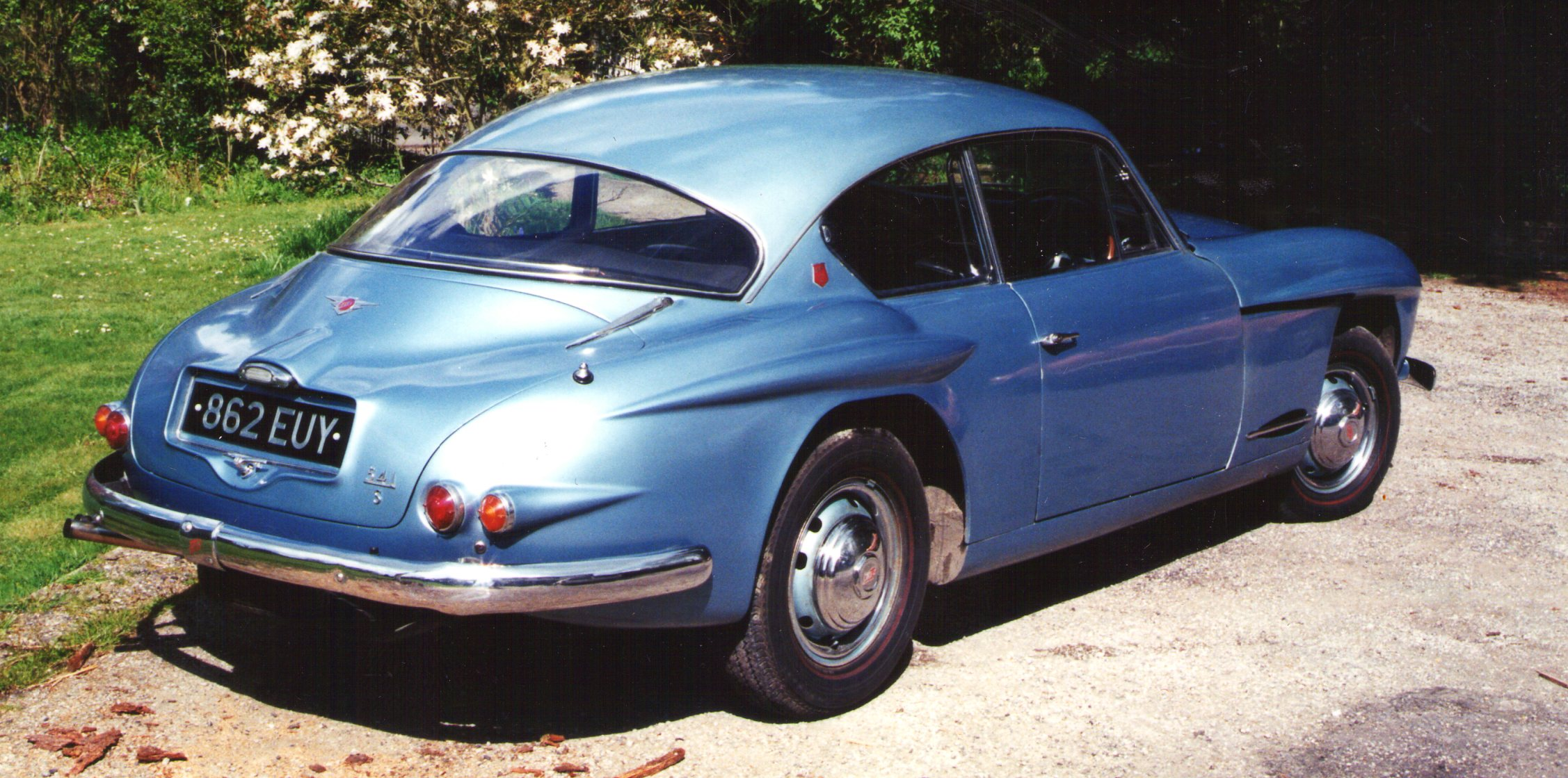

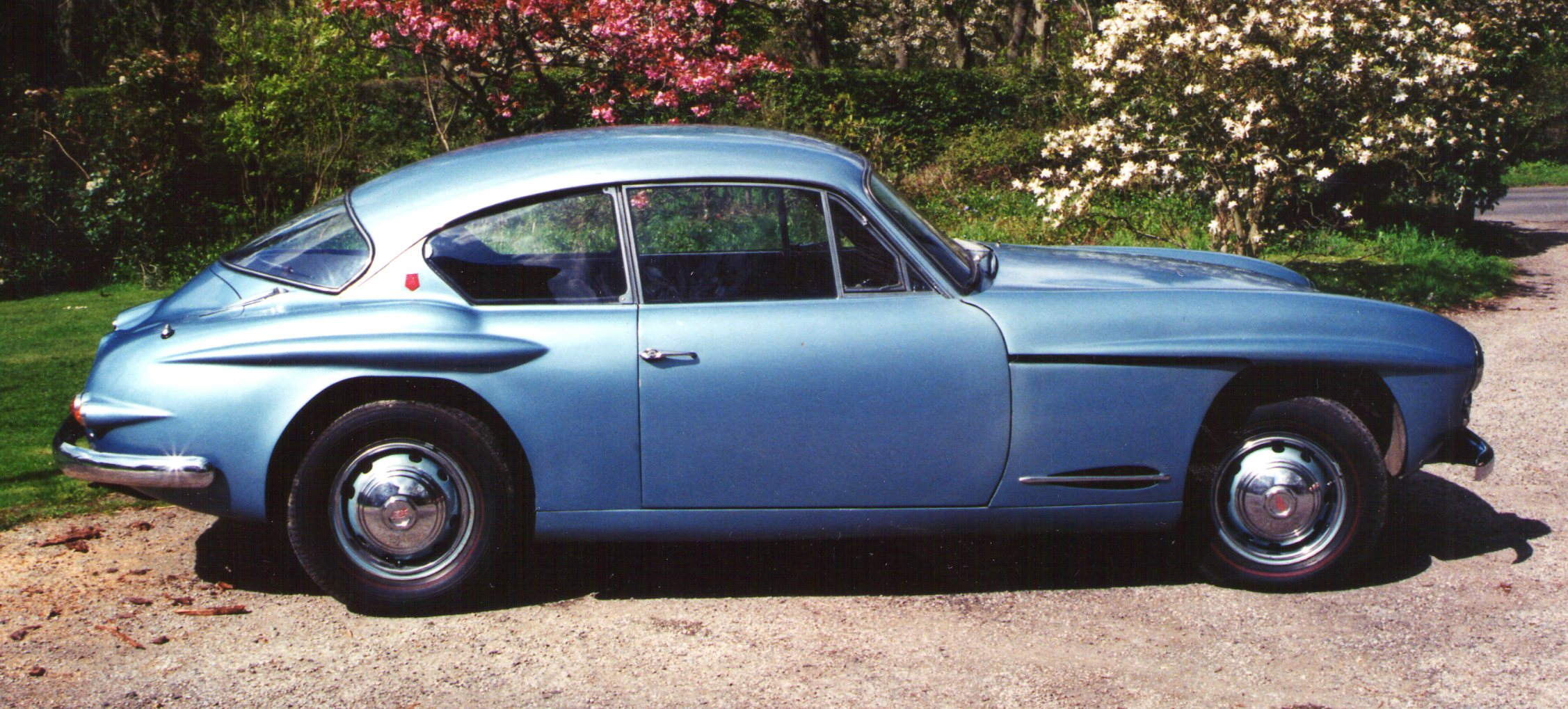
