= CV8 =

CV8 may refer to:

- USS Hornet (CV-8), an aircraft carrier operated by the United States Navy from 1941 until 1942 when she was sunk at the Battle of the Santa Cruz Islands
- Jensen CV8, a sports car produced by Jensen Motors from 1962 until 1966
