= FF Developments =

British transmission engineering company

FF (Ferguson Formula) Developments Limited (FFD) was a British company founded by Major A.P.R. (Tony) Rolt to exploit the 4WD technology begun originally at Dixon-Rolt Developments in partnership with Freddie Dixon and, from 1950 at Harry Ferguson Research. Rolt became Technical Director at Harry Ferguson Research until 1971, when the company was closed down.

According to Ward's Auto World the influence that FFD had on all wheel drive (AWD) development transcended its size.

== History ==
The company was founded in Coventry in 1971 by Tony Rolt. to exploit the 4WD technology begun originally at Dixon-Rolt Developments in partnership with Freddie Dixon and, from 1950 at Harry Ferguson Research.

FFD developed a number of prototype cars with the aim of selling the technology to car makers, much as Harry Ferguson Research had done after Ferguson's death. This included one of two Triumph Stags. One of their first successful conversions was for the Opel Admiral and Opel Senator cars used by BRIXMIS in Berlin, followed by Vauxhall-Bedford approved conversions of the Bedford CF van. The company also engineered the prototype AMC Eagle, the first mass-produced car in the world to feature full-time 4WD.

In 1981 Rolt's son, Stuart, joined the company as marketing director, becoming Chief Executive in 1986.

In 1983, FFD teamed up with the management of the British branch Schuler Presses to develop an aftermarket conversion for the Range Rover. The result was the Schuler Super Ranger, which could outperform the standard Range Rover on and off-road. The car subsidiary was bought out of the parent company subsequently renamed Overfinch

The arrival of the Audi Quattro opened the word's eyes to the advantages of 4WD. This prompted Ford's Bob Lutz to commission a 4WD Ford Sierra, which led to subsequent 4WD Ford models and to licensing of the Ferguson Formula world-wide through patents holder GKN and mass production of the components by GKN German subsidiary Viscodrive

Ferguson Formula 4WD was a key element in four Group B rally cars, the Peugeot 205 T16, the Lancia Delta S4, the Ford RS200 and the MG Metro 6R4. It was also used in the Lancia Delta Integrale.

In 1990 the company opened an engineering centre in Detroit.

Following its sale to the automotive consultancy group Ricardo in 1994, the company was renamed Ricardo-FFD. Stuart Rolt remained the CEO until 1996.

== Projects ==
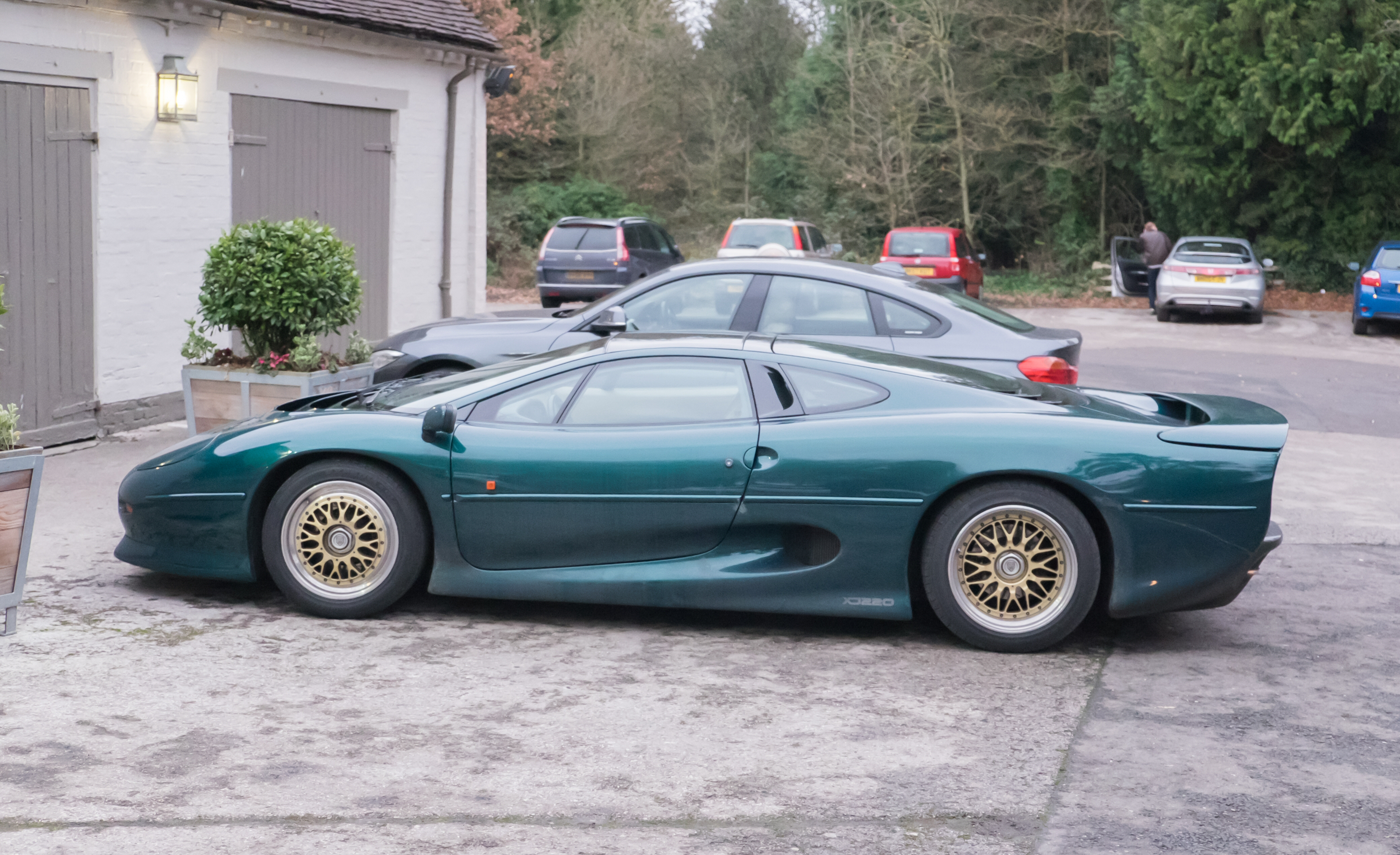
1997 Jaguar XJ220

- Ford RS200 - FFD built the driveline for all 200 cars
- Ford Sierra XR4x4 - FFD partnered with Ford Europe to develop the drivetrain
- Jaguar - FFD designed and developed the AWD system used on the Jaguar XJ220 220 mph supercar prototype which was shown for the first time at the 1988 British International Motor Show. Produced the transmission for the production 2WD car.
- Bedford CF2 4x4 - This was a joint collaboration between Vauxhall Motors and FFD offering automatic four wheel drive, a two speed transfer box and high rise option.
- General Motors - FFD designed and developed the AWD system used on the 1990 Chevrolet Astro/GMC Safari van.
- McLaren Cars - FFD manufactured the transmission system for the McLaren F1 supercar.
