= Ferguson Research =

British car designer and developer

Harry Ferguson Research Limited was a British company founded by Harry Ferguson who was mostly known as "the father of the modern farm tractor". He was also a pioneer aviator, becoming one of the first to build and fly his own aeroplane in Ireland, and also went on to develop four-wheel drive systems for cars including pioneering their use in Formula One racing cars. The company was based in Siskin Drive, in Coventry, England.

== History ==
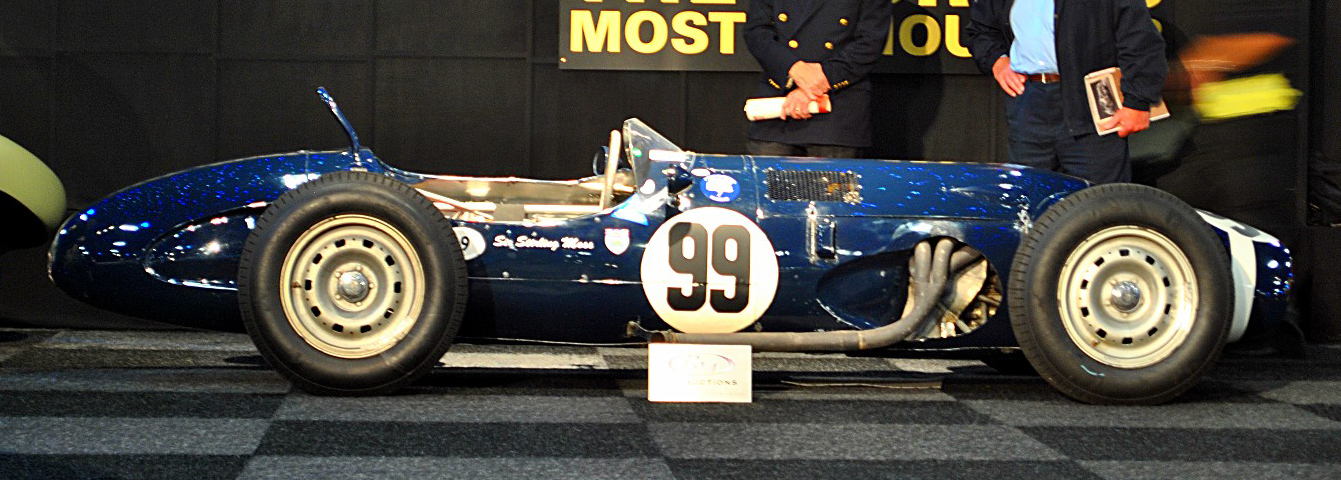
Ferguson P99 Formula One car from 1961

In the 1930s, racing driver Freddie Dixon began to develop the idea of producing a super-safe family car, with four-wheel drive and four-wheel steering. When Dixon was racing in the Ulster TT, he met Harry Ferguson, who garaged his car for him. Ferguson had developed the Ferguson System of tractor implements for reasons of safety and Dixon's ideas interested him. Army officer and racing driver Tony Rolt, who had engaged Dixon to maintain his ERA racing car became interested in Dixon's ideas and between them formed Dixon-Rolt Developments Ltd.

After the war, Rolt and Dixon persuaded Harry Ferguson to invest money in their company. Ferguson had sold out Massey-Harris, which became Massey Ferguson. He had also won a substantial lawsuit for patent infringement with the Ford Motor Company in the US and now had money to invest.

Porsche between 1946–47 developed the Type 360 Cisitalia Grand Prix, a single-seater 1.5-litre supercharged race car for the postwar Grand Prix class (later F1). The advanced design not only had Rear mid-engine, rear-wheel-drive layout like the Auto Union racing cars, but also four-wheel-drive.

In 1950, Harry Ferguson Research Ltd. was formed, with premises in Redhill, Surrey. Ferguson was chairman and Rolt and Dixon were directors. The plan was to design a four-wheel drive family car and sell the manufacturing rights to a big car maker. Ferguson moved the business to his premises in Coventry, a move which Dixon resisted and he left the company. Soon after, Ferguson broke with Massey Ferguson and eventually built new premises for Harry Ferguson Research Ltd at Siskin Drive, Coventry. Despite huge efforts, nobody was interested in the cars.

To promote the company's technology, Tony Rolt set in motion the development of a Coventry-Climax powered 4WD Formula One car rather late, in 1960. Already the 1959 Formula One season had been dominated by the low nimble mid-engine cars that had good traction even with 2500cc engines. For the 1961 Formula One season, the capacity was limited to 1500cc.

Despite the death of Ferguson in October 1960, the Ferguson P99 was raced during 1961 in UK F1 races by Rob Walker's team. The car raced only once in the World Championship at the July 1961 British Grand Prix. However the car won a non-championship race, the September 1961 International Gold Cup at Oulton Park with Stirling Moss as the driver. As of today, this is the only victory of a four-wheel drive car in F1 (and incidentally the last race won by Moss in Europe), with the technology banned in 1983. Despite its promising beginnings this front-engined car was soon made obsolete by mid-engined cars.

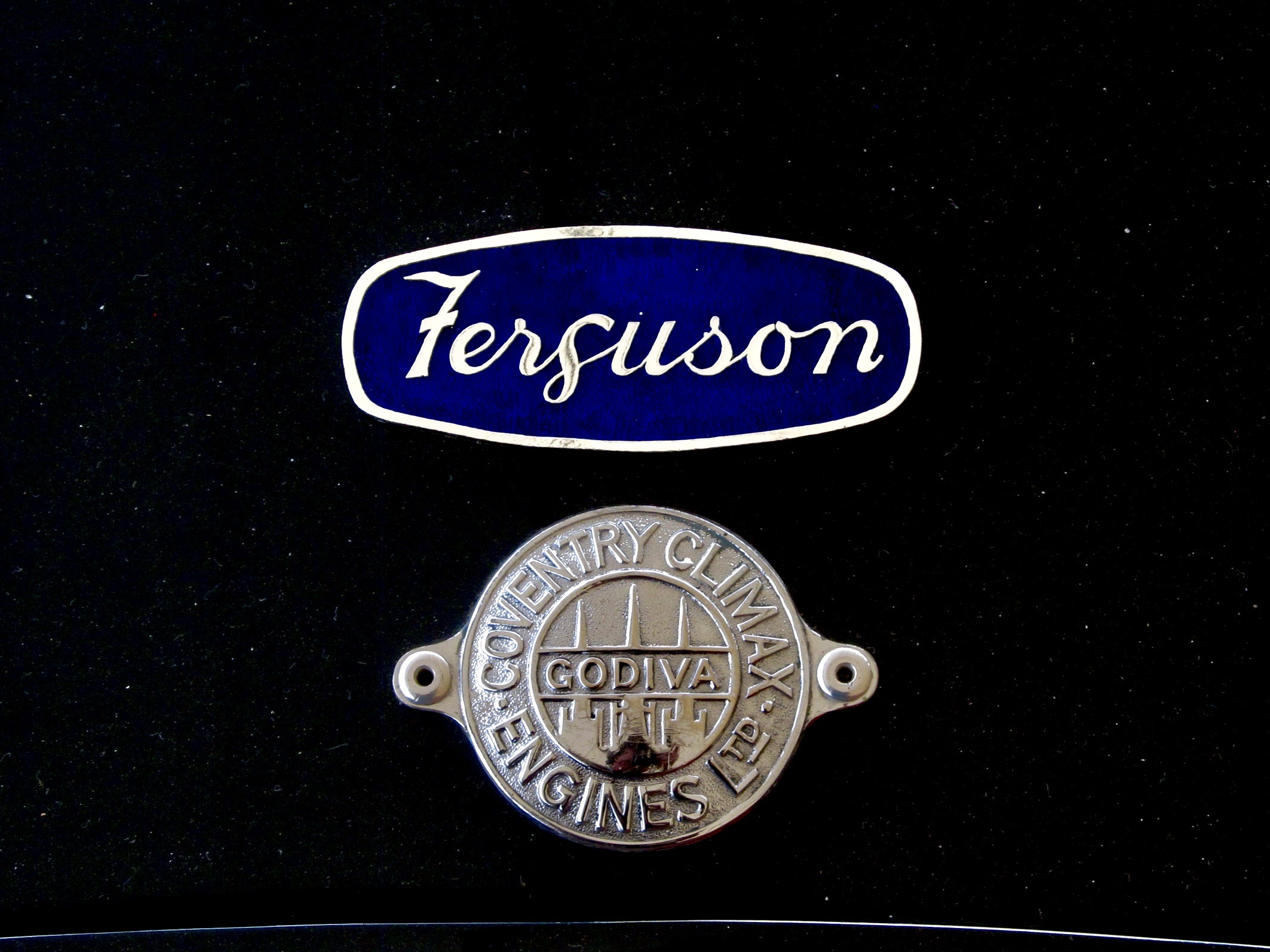
Ferguson and Coventry Climax badges on the former's P99 Grand Prix car, Goodwood Members' Meeting 2014

Ferguson Research went on in racing, supplying the Novi engine-powered P104 to the STP team for Indianapolis. In 1964 the Ferguson P99, by then fitted with a 2.5 litre Climax engine, was lent to Peter Westbury who used it to win the British Hillclimb Championship that year. Westbury built two 4WD sports racing cars, Felday 4, powered by a BRM V8 and Felday 5, powered by a 7-litre Holman Moody Ford V8. In 1964, Harry Ferguson research built a Novi-powered car for the Indianapolis 500 for Andy Granatelli's STP team, the 4WD Formula One BRM P67 car for BRM in 1964, provided the 4WD system for the Lotus 56 turbine Indy car and 56B turbine Formula 1 car.

=== Ferguson Formula 4WD ===
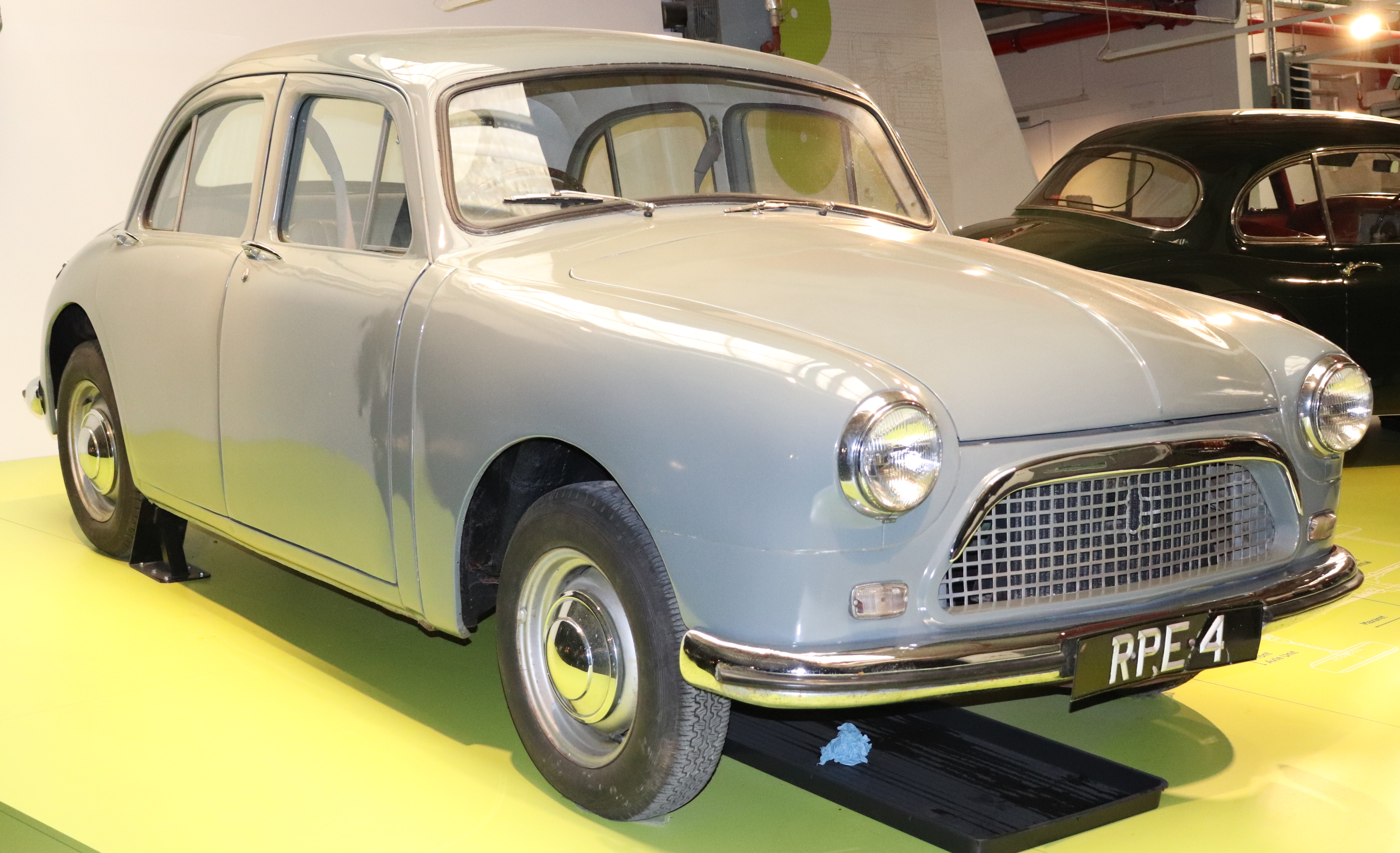
1959 Ferguson R3F 4WD prototype

Soon after Ferguson's death, his son-in-law Tony Sheldon took over the chairmanship of Harry Ferguson Research and changed the company policy to one of developing 4WD systems that could be adopted by car makers for their own models. Jensen Motors took up the idea, stretching the Interceptor by 5 in (130 mm) to create the FF (for Ferguson Formula, Ferguson's term for 4WD). It appeared in 1966. The high cost of its hand-built 4WD system kept it from being a commercial success. The company also converted a number of Ford Mustangs to 4WD with the aim of getting Ford in the US to make them as a production model. In 1969 the company converted a fleet of Ford Zephyr MkIV police vehicles for assessment by the UK government, with interests in possible military use.

In 1968, GKN took a stake in the company, with the intention of mass-producing 4WD systems for production cars. The first company to be interested was Ford of Britain, who. examined the idea of a 4WD Capri. Production issues prevented a 3-litre 4WD model from being manufactured.

In 1969, there was a 4WD boom in F1 with the top teams of the era with Matra, Lotus and McLaren among others building 4WD cars. Only Matra used the Ferguson system. (Cosworth also built a 4WD car but using their own system). The 1968 seasons had seen many wet races and the constructors were searching for means to increase the grip of the cars. The 1969 British Grand Prix, saw a record number of four 4WD cars entered, with John Miles in a Lotus 63 achieving the best finish of 10th. Tyre technology had vastly improved and 1969 also saw the introduction of wings in F1 and as there was no wet race that year, all the competitors ceased developing 4WD F1 cars as wings appeared as an easier way to increase grip. 4WD no longer presented any advantage in F1, if it ever did. Team Lotus made a last attempt with the Ferguson system on the gas turbine powered Lotus 56B in 1971, but the car was uncompetitive. Eventually, in 1971, Tony Sheldon decided that too much money had been pumped into research with no real result and closed down Harry Ferguson Research Ltd.

Tony Rolt was convinced of 4WD's future in road cars and in 1971 formed a new company called FF Developments to develop Ferguson's four-wheel drive systems.

== Complete Formula One World Championship results ==
(key)

Year	Entrant	Chassis	Engine	Driver	1	2	3	4	5	6	7	8	Pts.	WCC
1961	Rob Walker Racing	Ferguson P99	Climax L4		MON	NED	BEL	FRA	GBR	GER	ITA	USA	0	–
1961	Rob Walker Racing	Ferguson P99	Climax L4	Jack Fairman/ Stirling Moss					DSQ				0	–

== See also ==
- Ferguson Company
