= Jensen Interceptor =

British grand touring car made 1966-1976

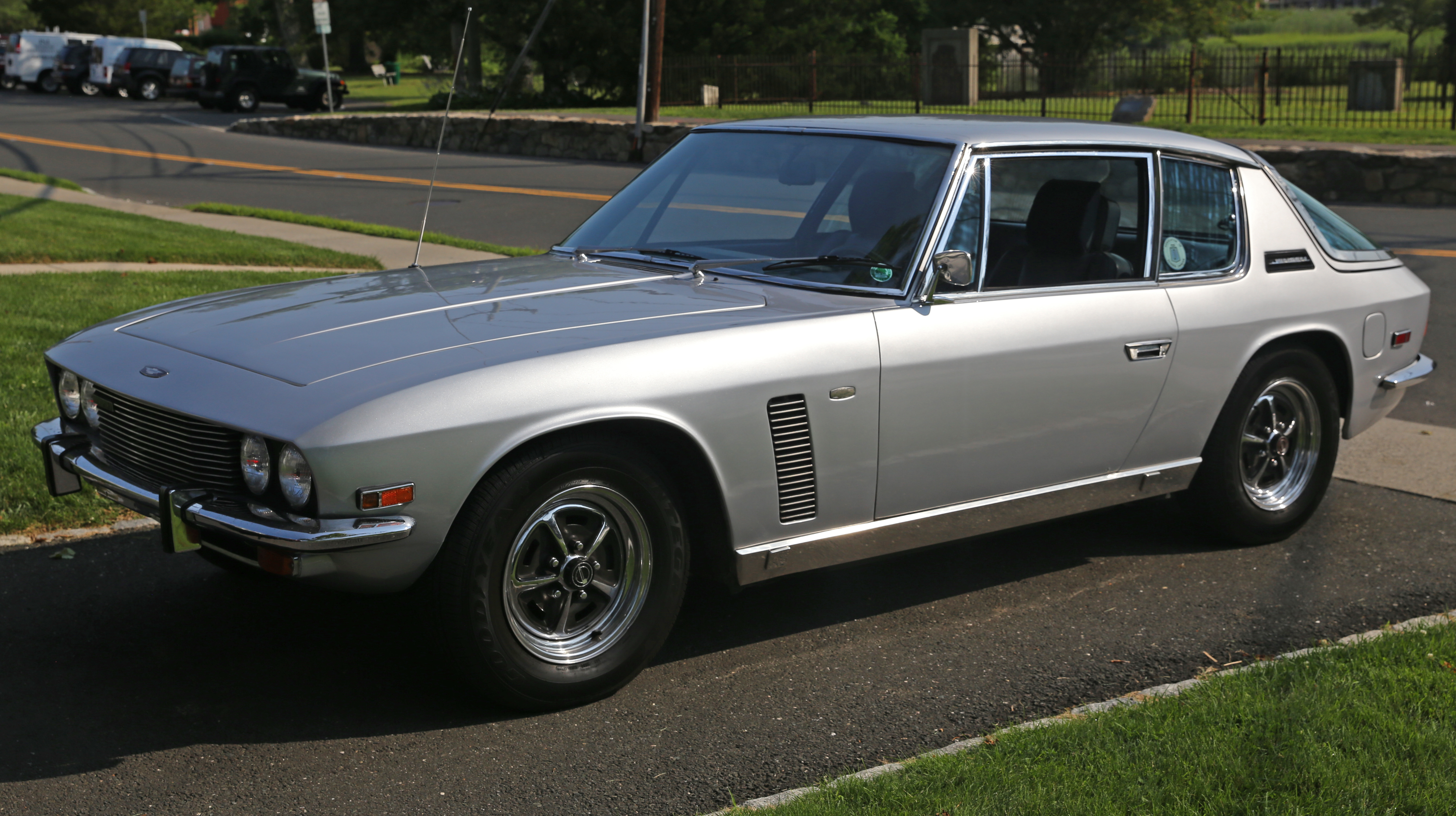
- 1971 Jensen Interceptor MkII (US)

Overview
- Manufacturer: Jensen
- Production: 1966–1976; 6,408 produced
- Assembly: West Bromwich, England
- Designer: Federico Formenti of Carrozzeria Touring

Body and chassis
- Class: Grand Tourer
- Body style: 3-door 4-seat hatchback; 2-door 4-seat convertible; 2-door 4-seat coupé
- Layout: Front-engine, rear-wheel-drive
- Related: Jensen FF

Powertrain
- Engine: 383 cu in (6.3 L) low deck big block V8 (1966-1971); 440 cu in (7.2 L) high deck big block V8 (1971-1976); 360 cu in (5.9 L) small block LA V8 (S4)
- Transmission: 4-speed manual; 3-speed Torqueflite A727 automatic

Dimensions
- Wheelbase: 105.3 in (2,675 mm)
- Length: 186 in (4,724 mm)
- Width: 69 in (1,753 mm)
- Height: 53 in (1,346 mm)
- Curb weight: 3,500 lb (1,588 kg)

Chronology
- Predecessor: Jensen CV8

The Jensen Interceptor is a grand touring car that was hand-built at the Kelvin Way Factory in West Bromwich, near Birmingham, England, by Jensen Motors between 1966 and 1976. The Interceptor name had been used previously by Jensen for the Jensen Interceptor made between 1950 and 1957 at the Carters Green factory. Jensen had extensively used glass-reinforced plastic to fabricate body panels over the preceding two decades, but the new Interceptor was a return to a steel body shell. The body was designed by an outside firm, Carrozzeria Touring of Italy, rather than the in-house staff. The early bodies were built in Italy by Vignale, before Jensen took production in-house, making some subtle body modifications.

== History and specifications ==
Jensen Motors used Chrysler V8 engines for the Interceptor, starting with the 6.3 L (6,276 cc; 383.0 cu in) with optional manual (Mark I, 22 built) or TorqueFlite automatic transmissions driving the rear wheels through a limited slip differential in a conventional Salisbury rear axle. In 1970, the 383 c.i. produced 335 hp SAE gross, or 270 hp SAE net. Since this engine was detuned by Chrysler for use with low octane petrol, and only produced 250 hp SAE net in 1971, Jensen chose to use the 440 in^{3} (7,200 cc) Chrysler engine for 1971.

For 1971, two 440 ci engines were offered. One had a four-barrel carburetor and produced 305 hp SAE net. The other, which had three 2-barrel carburetors and produced 330 hp SAE net, was only available in 1971. Only 232 cars were built with the 440 "six pack", called the Jensen SP (with no "Interceptor" badging), and it had the distinction of being the most powerful car ever to have been made by Jensen.

For 1972, the 440 c.i. engine with three 2-barrel carburetors was no longer produced by Chrysler. The 440 ci engine that remained was detuned to 280 hp SAE net. Chrysler continued to offer a high-performance 440 c.i. engine through to 1976 when it only produced 255 hp SAE net.

The Interceptor may have taken some styling cues from the Brasinca Uirapuru, with a distinctive large, curving wrap-around rear window that doubled as a tailgate. The original specification included electric windows, reclining front seats, a wood rimmed steering wheel, radio with twin speakers, reversing lights and an electric clock. Power steering was included as standard from September 1968.

The Mark II was announced in October 1969, with slightly revised styling around the headlamps, front grille and bumper, and revised rear lights. The interior was substantially revised in order to meet US regulations, and air conditioning was an option.

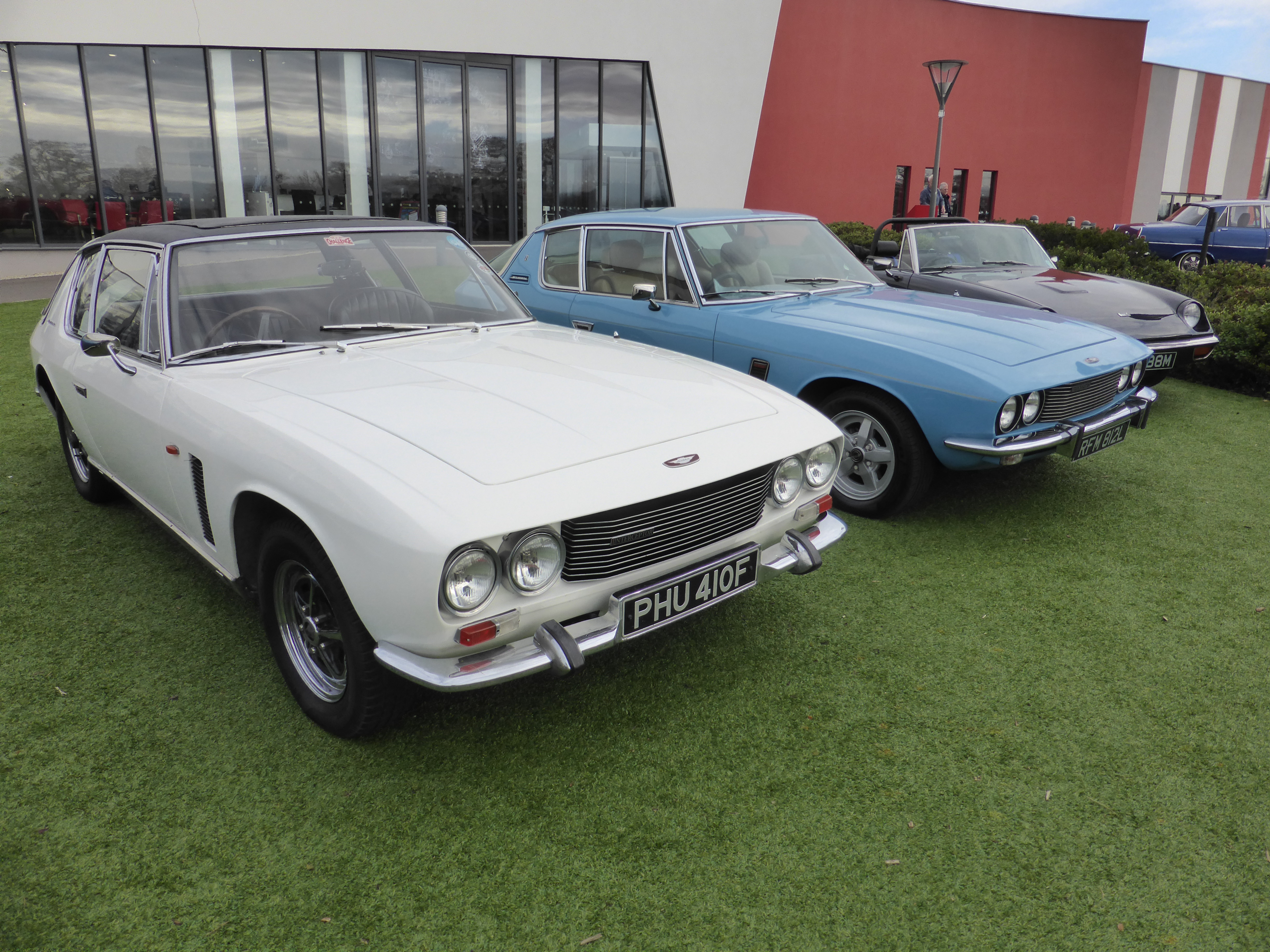
1967 Interceptor, 1973 Interceptor III & 1973 Jensen-Healey

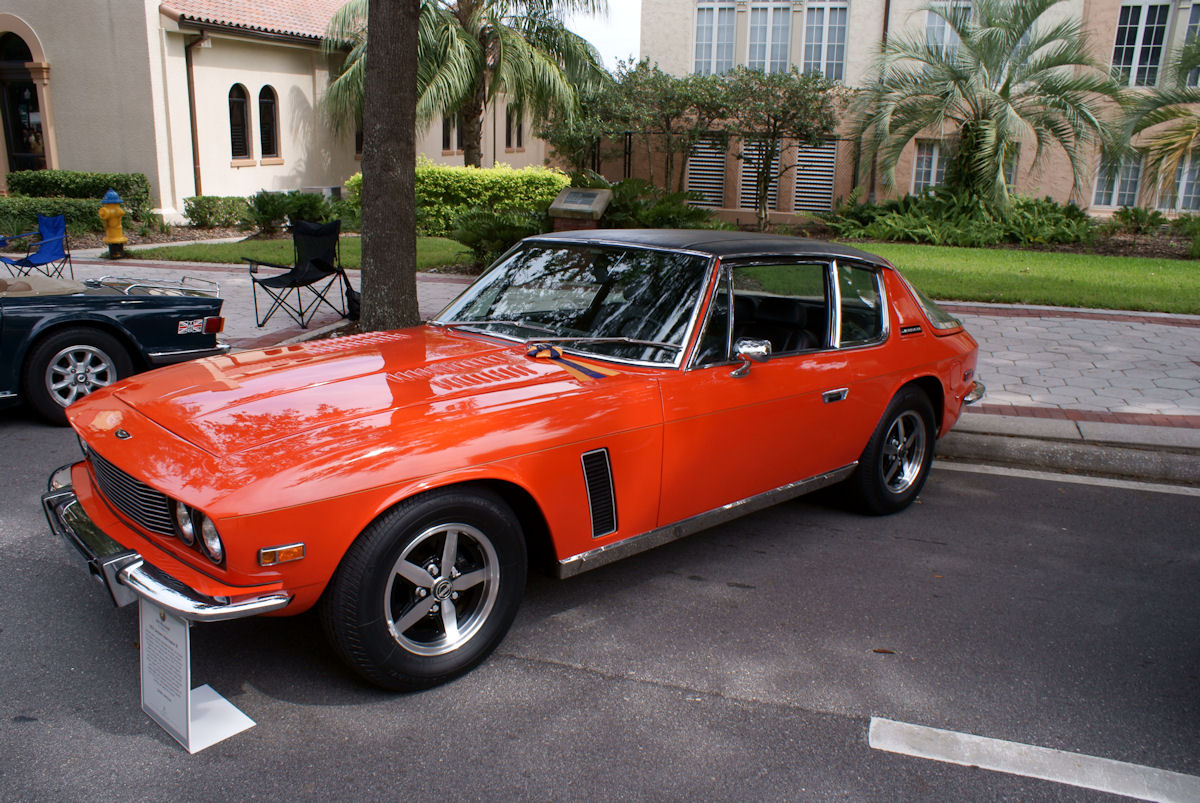
1974 Interceptor III US model

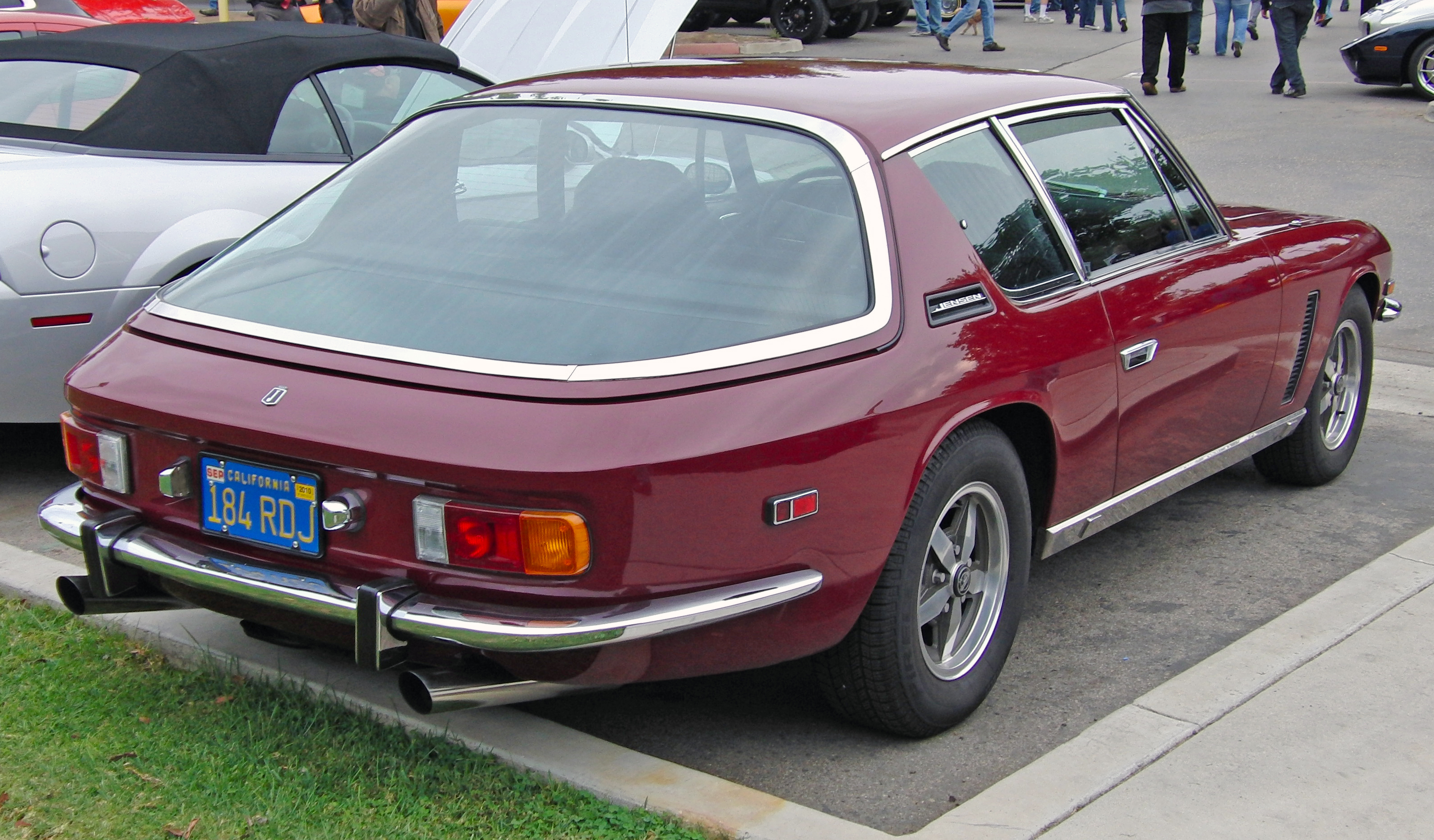
Interceptor III - rear view

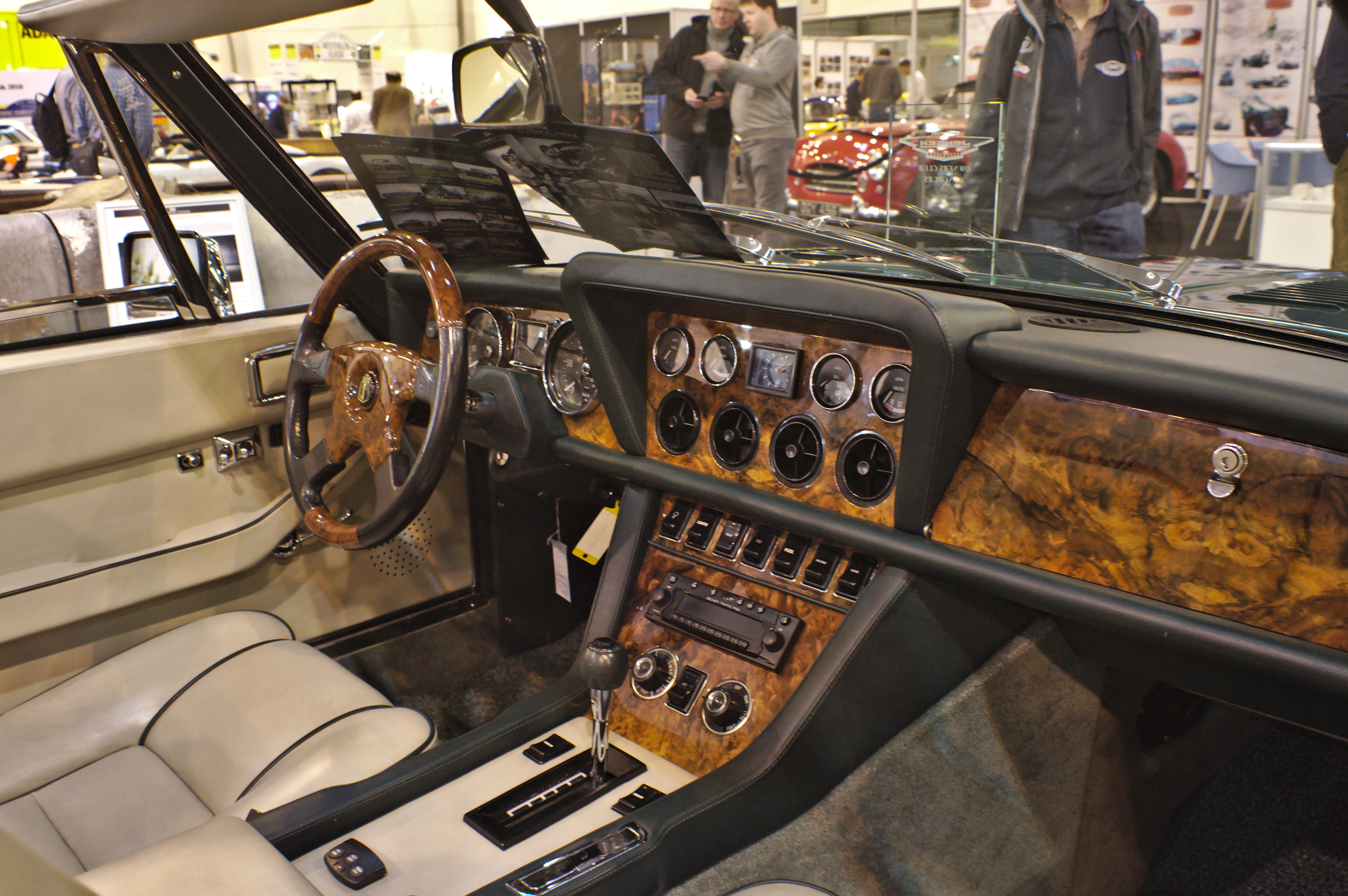
Interior of an Interceptor III convertible

The Mark III, introduced in 1971, revised the front grille, headlamp finishers and bumper treatment again. It had GKN alloy wheels and air conditioning as standard, and revised seats. It was divided into G-, H-, and J-series depending on the production year. The 6.3-litre 383 ci engine was superseded by the 7.2-litre 440 ci in 1971.

Jensen had fallen on hard times by 1975, owing to the then world-wide recession, and to problems with its Jensen-Healey sports car. The company was placed into receivership, and the receivers allowed production to continue until the available cache of parts was exhausted. Production of the Interceptor ended in 1976.

Later, a group of investors trading under the new Jensen Cars Limited brand name stepped in and relaunched production of the 1970s Interceptor, which was briefly re-introduced in the late 1980s as the Series 4 (S4) which was an updated version of the original Interceptor V8 series giving a new lifespan for the Jensen brand and its car production was resumed. The car came back as a low-volume hand-built and bespoke affair, marketed in a similar way to Bristol, with a price of £70,000. Though the body remained essentially the same as the last of the main production run of Series 3, the engine was a much smaller, Chrysler-supplied, 360 cubic inch (5.9-litre) which used more modern controls to reduce emissions comparatively and still producing about 250 bhp. In addition, the interior was slightly re-designed with the addition of modern "sports" front seats as opposed to the armchair style of the earlier models, as well as a revised dashboard and electronics.

The then owner sold up in 1990 to an engineering company believed to be in a stronger position to manufacture the car; this lasted until 1993 with approximately 36 cars built, and while work commenced on development of a new Interceptor Series 5 (S5) for the 1990s however the receivers were called in for a second time and the company was liquidated.

== Variants ==
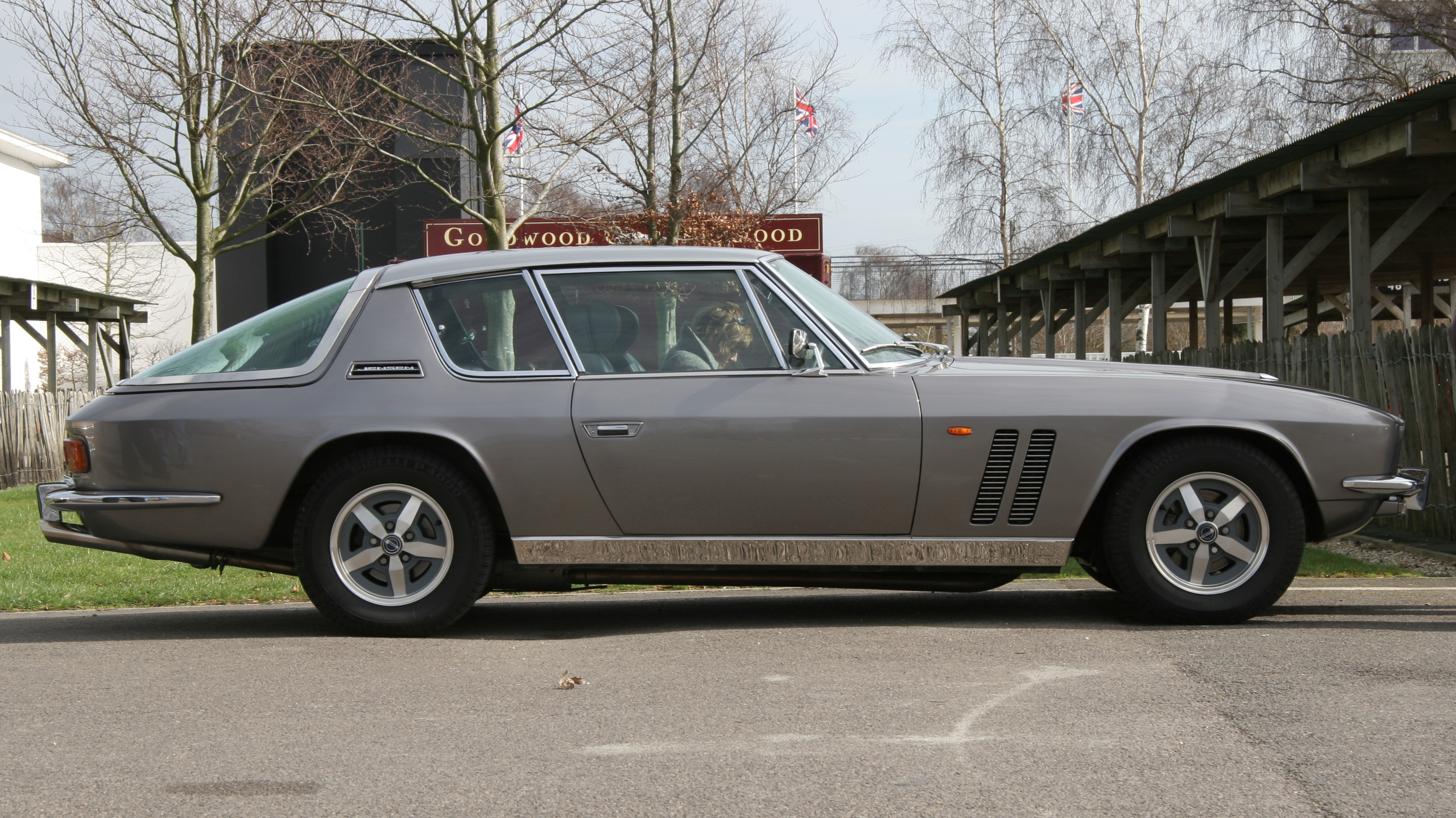
1971 FF - with dual side intakes

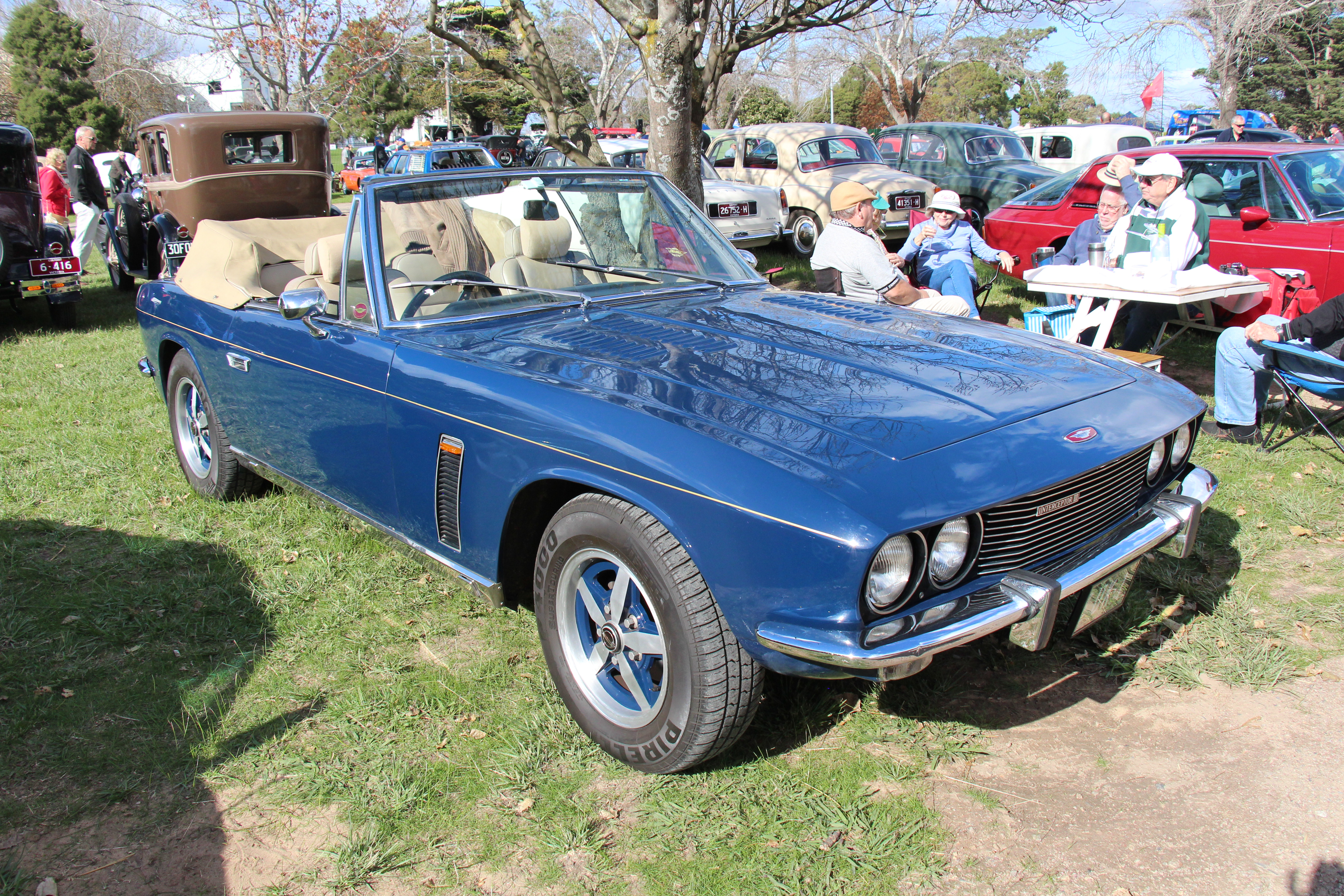
1973 Interceptor III convertible

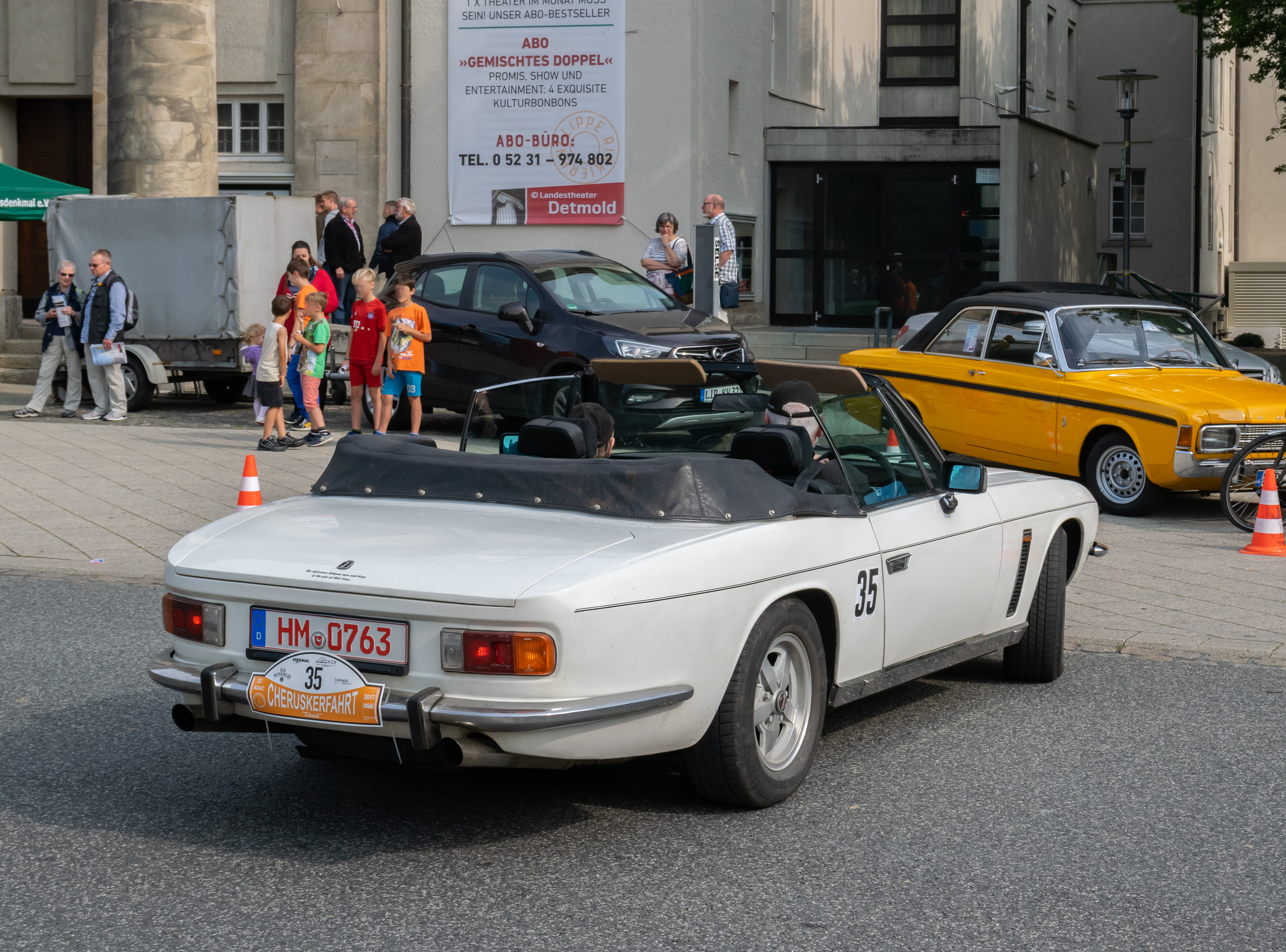
1974 convertible - rear view

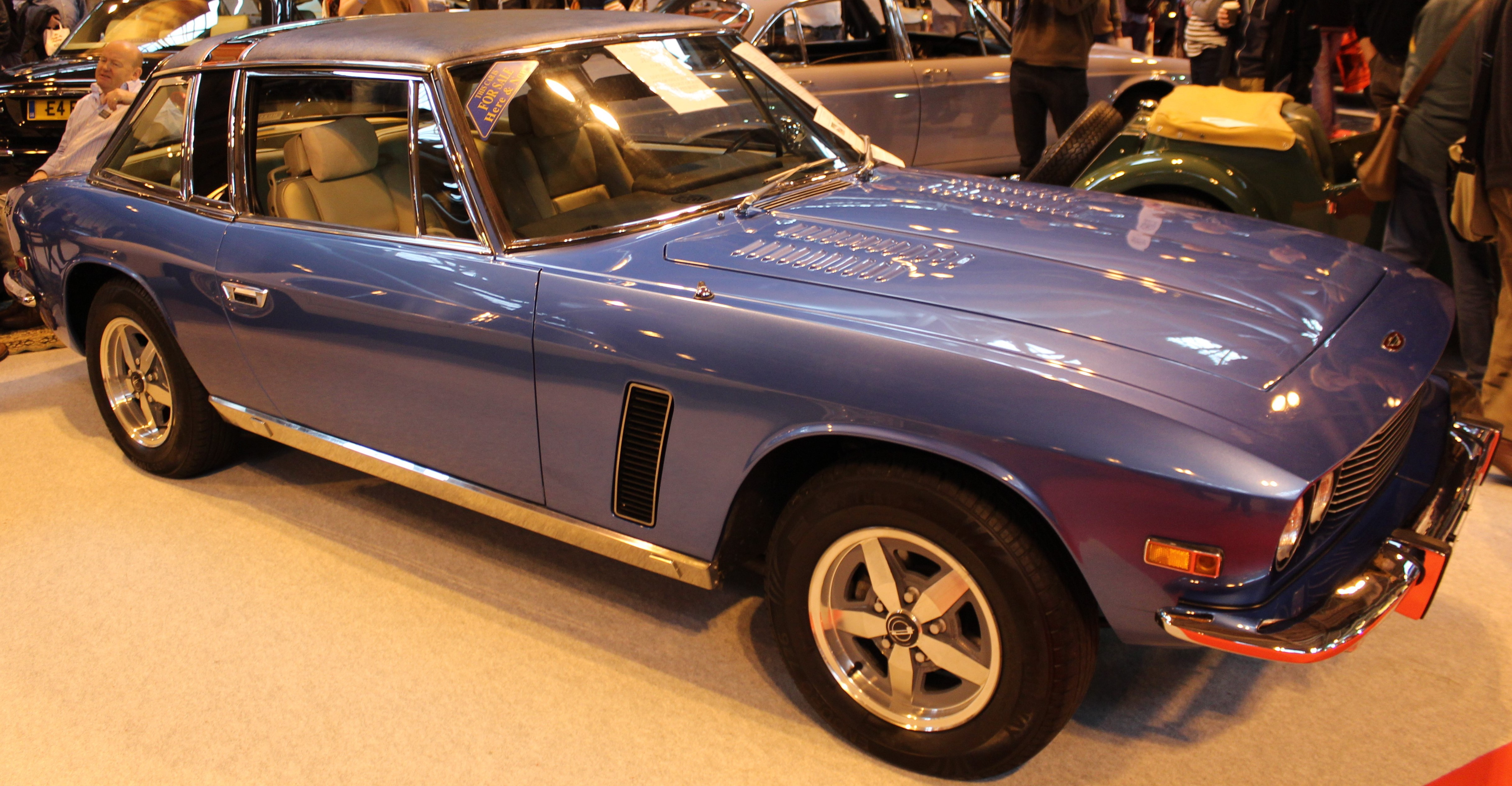
1975 coupé

=== Jensen FF four wheel drive ===
Jensen was one of the first manufacturers to equip a production car with four-wheel drive, in the 1967 Jensen FF (Ferguson Formula). At the time it was hailed as a remarkable development, coming also with Dunlop Maxaret mechanical anti-lock brakes and traction control. The car is five inches (127 mm) longer than the Interceptor. Although looking virtually the same, the extra length can be seen from additional side vent ahead of the doors on the front flanks, and an additional swage line in the leading edge of the front wing. Press articles from the time quote "drag-strip" performance when describing the car. In total 320 FFs were produced; 195 Mark I, 110 Mark II and 15 Mark III.

=== SP ===
The Jensen SP, with a Six-Pack carburettor system, was launched in 1971, as the company's new flagship replacing the FF and was one of the most powerful road cars anywhere in the world. This came with a vinyl roof, Learjet 8-track and a full louvred bonnet as standard. The 440 SP engine with its six pack carburettor produced 385 B.H.P. and a top speed of 147 mph (237 kph). SPs could be more economical than standard four-barrel Interceptors; 16–18 mpg could be achieved. Two hundred and thirty-two SPs were made, 219 in RHD and 13 in LHD.

=== Convertible ===
A convertible with powered soft top was introduced in 1974, mainly intended for the American market but also sold in Europe. Two hundred sixty-seven convertibles were made.

=== Coupé ===
Rarer still is the Coupé version introduced in 1975; just 60 were made in the one year before the company's demise. The coupé was derived from the convertible and therefore lacks the distinctive rear window of the regular car.

=== Jensen Interceptor R ===
A Jensen specialist JIA based in Banbury Oxfordshire, England, rebuilds original Interceptors using modern components, with General Motors supplied LS 6.2-litre naturally aspirated or supercharged engines and six-speed automatic or manual transmissions.

In May 2010, Jensen International Automotive was set up, with the financial backing of Carphone Warehouse founder and chairman Charles Dunstone who joined its board of directors. A small number of Jensen Interceptor Ss, which had started production under a previous company, were completed by Jensen International Automotive (JIA), in parallel with JIA's own production of the new Jensen Interceptor R; deliveries of the latter started at the beginning of 2011.

=== Jensen Interceptor GTX (upcoming) ===
As of April 2026, Jensen International Automotive has planned the return of the Interceptor under the name Interceptor GTX which will be an all-new vehicle with modern styling drawn from the original Interceptor. It is intended to be built in low numbers with a V8 engine, an aluminium chassis and body, and a promised 'analogue' high-performance driving experience.

== In popular culture ==
The Interceptor's styling and motor attracted many celebrity buyers including Lynda Carter, Cher, Winthrop Paul Rockefeller, and Frank Sinatra.

In the 1970s ATV series The Protectors, the lead character Harry Rule (Robert Vaughn) drove an Interceptor.

The 1980s Seven Network film series of The Saint starring Simon Dutton in the title role drove a 1975 Interceptor MKIII.

In both the 2001–2008 BBC One series The Inspector Lynley Mysteries, and the 2025 Lynley reboot, the eponymous Inspector Lynley character drives an Interceptor MKII.
