= Jensen FF =

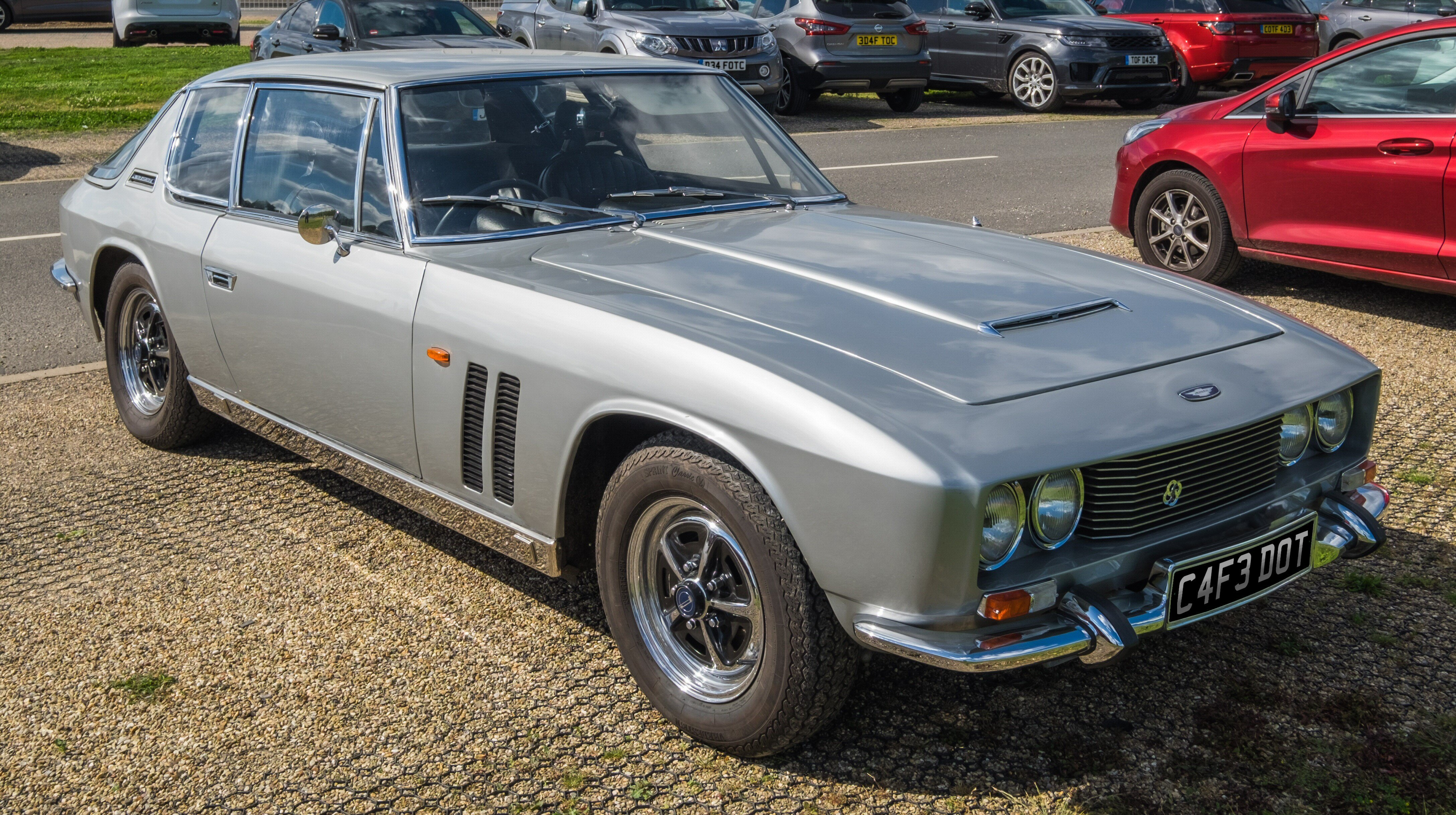

Overview
- Manufacturer: Jensen Motors
- Production: 1966–1971; 320 produced
- Assembly: West Bromwich, England
- Designer: Federico Formenti at Carrozzeria Touring Superleggera

Body and chassis
- Class: Grand tourer
- Body style: 3-door 4-seat hatchback
- Layout: Front-engine, four-wheel-drive
- Related: Jensen Interceptor

Powertrain
- Engine: 6,277 cc (6.3 L; 383.0 cu in) Chrysler 383 V8
- Transmission: 3-speed TorqueFlite A727 automatic

Dimensions
- Wheelbase: 109 in (2,769 mm)
- Length: 191 in (4,851 mm)
- Width: 69 in (1,753 mm)
- Height: 55 in (1,397 mm)
- Kerb weight: 3,808 lb (1,727 kg)

The Jensen FF is a four-wheel drive grand tourer produced by British car manufacturer Jensen Motors between 1966 and 1971. It was the first non all-terrain production car equipped with four-wheel drive and an anti-lock braking system. The powertrain was sourced from Chrysler, installing the second generation 6,277 cc (6.3 L; 383.0 cu in) V8 engine and 3-speed TorqueFlite A727 automatic transmission.

The use of four-wheel drive in a passenger car preceded the successful AMC Eagle by thirteen years, the Audi Quattro by fourteen years, and the Subaru Leone by five years. The Dunlop Maxaret mechanical anti-lock braking system had previously been used only on aircraft, lorries, and racing cars. An experimental version was first fitted to the earlier Jensen C-V8, but this did not go into production.

The letters FF stand for Ferguson Formula, after Ferguson Research Ltd., who invented the car's four-wheel drive system. The FF is related to the similar-looking, rear-wheel drive Jensen Interceptor, but is 127 mm (5.0 in) longer, and mechanically very different.

Standard FF features included front seat belts, a tachometer, and map pockets.

== Reception and sales ==
Although it was a highly innovative vehicle in a technical sense, the FF was not commercially successful. Its price was high — about 30% higher than the Jensen Interceptor, and more than that of luxury GTs from much more prestigious makers. In the UK, a reputed 320 to 330 examples of the Jensen FF V8 model were made by Jensen Motors Limited, according to The Jensen Owners Club.

The FF also suffered from a design problem, and not one easily cured: the system was set up for a driver in the right-hand seat, and no consideration had been given to making it left-hand drive. In particular, the central transfer case and both propeller shafts protruded into the left-hand seat space. The steering gear and brake servo were fitted on the right-hand side, and there was no space for them on the left. By the early 1970s, Jensen's primary markets were overseas markets where cars were driven on the right-hand side of the road. The FF could not be sold in the United States.

== Appearance ==
The FF may be distinguished from the Interceptor by a few styling cues, the most obvious being the twin (rather than single) diagonal air vents on the front wing, just rear of the wheel-arches. The frontal appearance was revised in September 1968.

Only coupés were made; there were no convertibles.

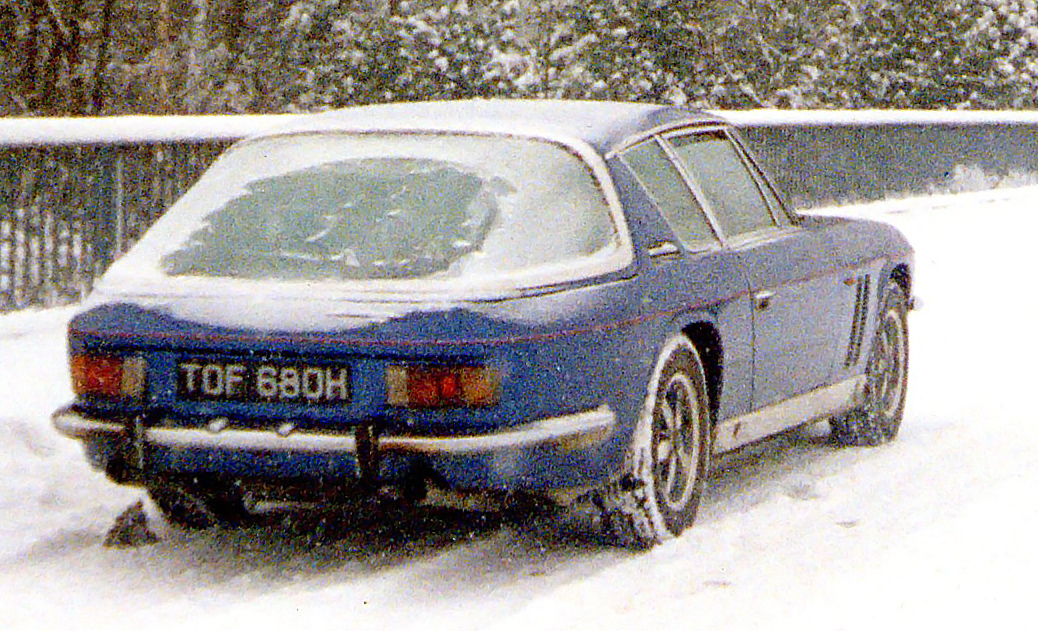
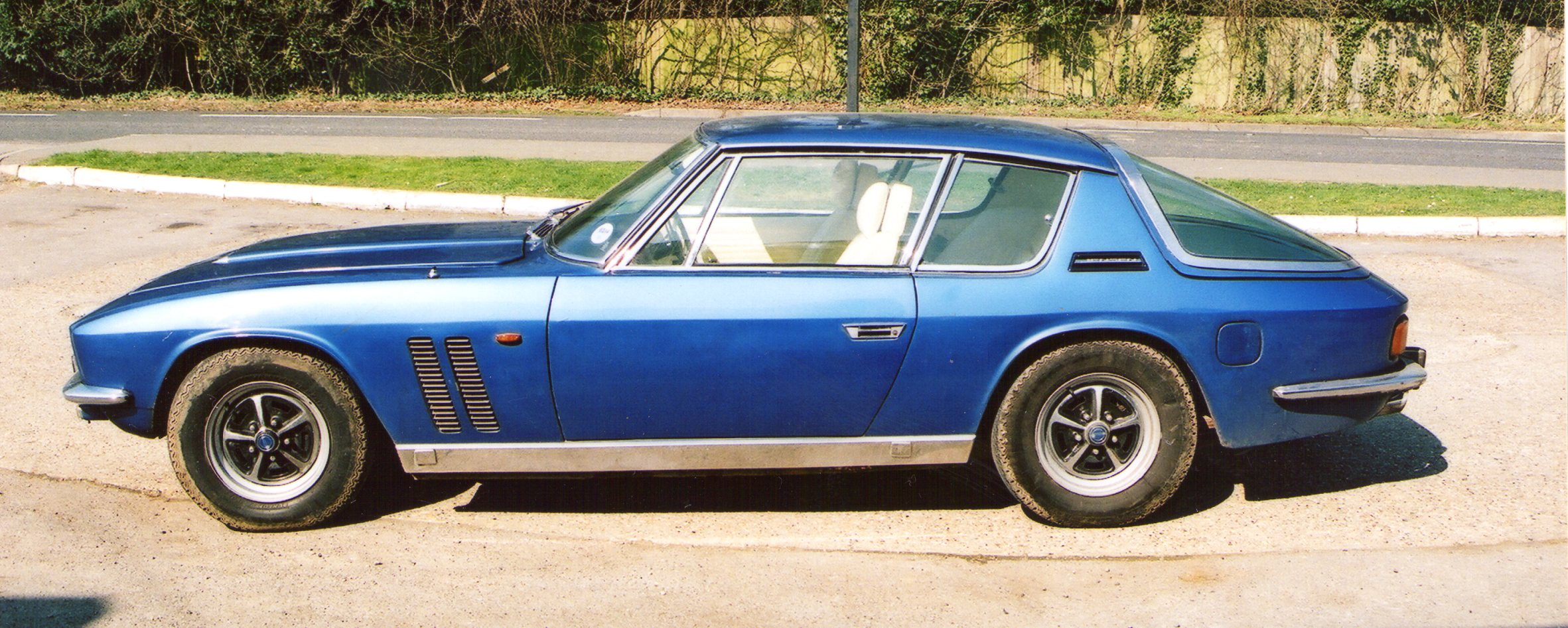

== Derivatives ==
One experimental Ferguson FF was built in 1968 with a 7-litre (430-cubic-inch) Hemi engine imported from Chrysler in the U.S. Further Hemi engine equipped models were not built, due to the limits of the suspension at extremely high speeds, and the cost of importing the Hemi engine into Britain, which was deemed too great.

This version was equipped with a 7.2-litre (440-cubic-inch) engine with a "Six Pack" induction system (three 2-barrel carburetors) as well as four-wheel drive. Less than ten are thought to have been built.

== Models ==
Dinky Toys produced a die-cast model of the FF, available in both ready-constructed and kit form. Playart also produced a 1:64 scale FF, possibly scaled down from the Dinky model. Corgi produced a small-size range of cars branded 'rockets', with removable chassis & axles (using a special key supplied) that included an interceptor variant.

The Dinky car had opening doors and both the Playart and Dinky models featured an opening bonnet (hood).
