= Brasinca Uirapuru =

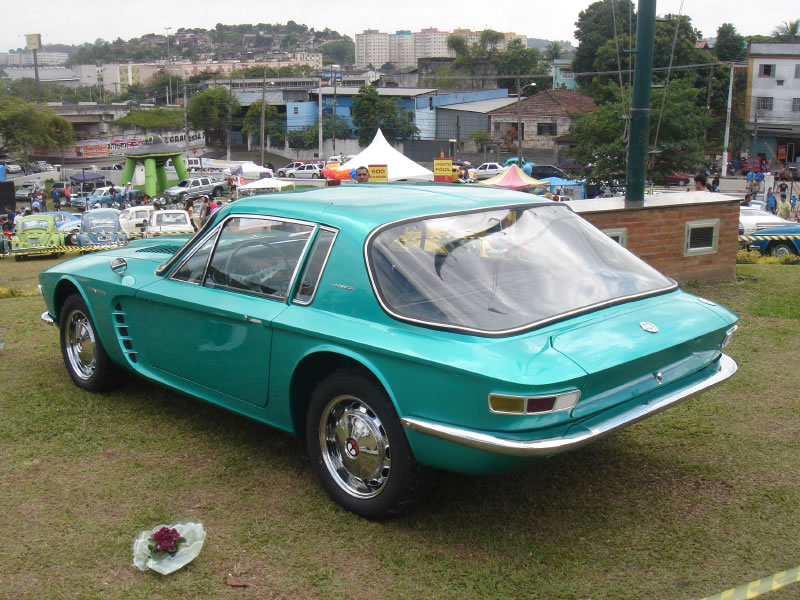

Overview
- Manufacturer: Brasinca SA
- Also called: Brasinca 4200
- Production: 1964-1966 (77 produced)
- Designer: Rigoberto Soler Gisbert

Body and chassis
- Layout: Front-engine, rear-wheel-drive

Powertrain
- Engine: 4,271 cc Chevrolet I6
- Transmission: 3-speed manual; 4-speed manual

The Brasinca Uirapuru was a GT-class sports coupe manufactured in Brazil between 1964 and 1966. Due to high production costs, only 77 units were made.

== History ==
Originally named the 4200 GT, the Uirapuru was developed to showcase and promote the capabilities of Brasinca, who built trucks and stamped car parts for other manufacturers. 77 cars were made from 1964 to 1966, including three convertibles, when Brasinca shut it down due to high manufacturing costs.

The Uirapuru bears a strong resemblance to the Jensen Interceptor, which entered production the same year that Uirapuru production ended, and took styling cues from the Uirapuru.

== Performance ==
Unlike other sports cars of its time that used fiberglass bodies, Uirapuru had a hand-built sheet steel body placed on a bespoke monoblock frame. The Uirapuru was one of the first Brazilian cars to undergo wind tunnel testing in the Aeronautical Technological Institute (ITA), in São José dos Campos. The original 4200 GT was powered by a 6-cylinder 4271 cc Chevrolet truck engine that used three SU carburetors and produced 155 hp (116 kW).

The later 4200 S had 163 hp (122 kW) thanks to Iskenderian valve control and the 4200 GTS had 170 hp (127 kW). The 4200 GT accelerated from 0–100 km/h (0–62 mph) in 10.4 seconds with a top speed of around 200 km/h (120 mph).
