= Playart =

Toy company

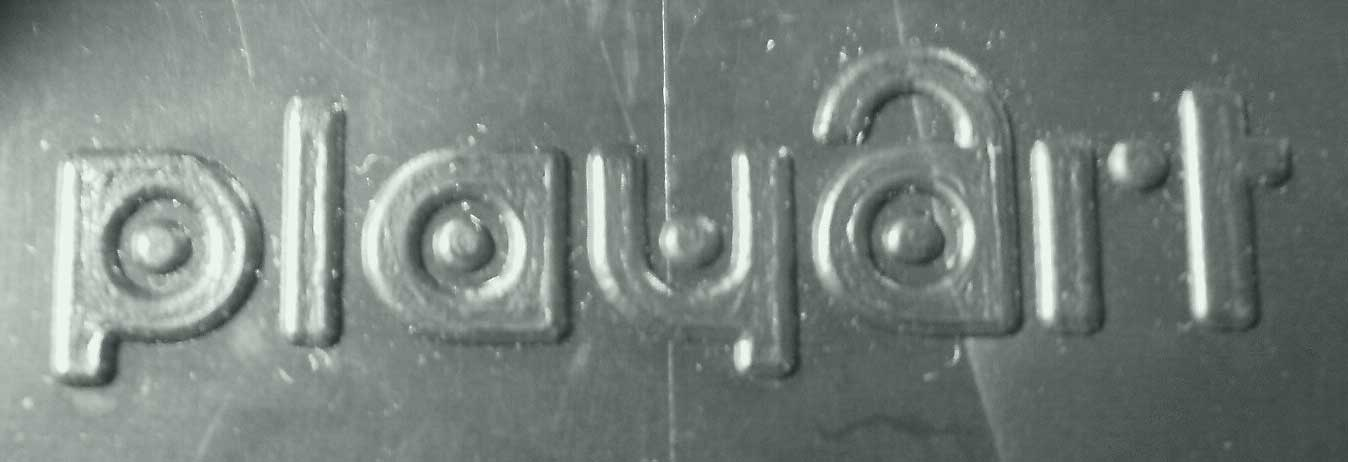
Playart toys were made in Hong Kong.

Playart was a toy company owned by Hong Kong industrialist Duncan Tong (唐鼎康) that specialized in die-cast toy cars, similar in size and style to Hot Wheels, Matchbox or Tomica. Cars were well done, but were often diecast seconds from other companies like Yatming or Tomica. Cars were made from 1965 to 1983 at the factory in San Po Kong, Kowloon, Hong Kong. Plastic cars and trucks of 1:43, and 1:24 scale were also made, while trains and other theme toys also appeared.

== Diverse marketing approaches ==
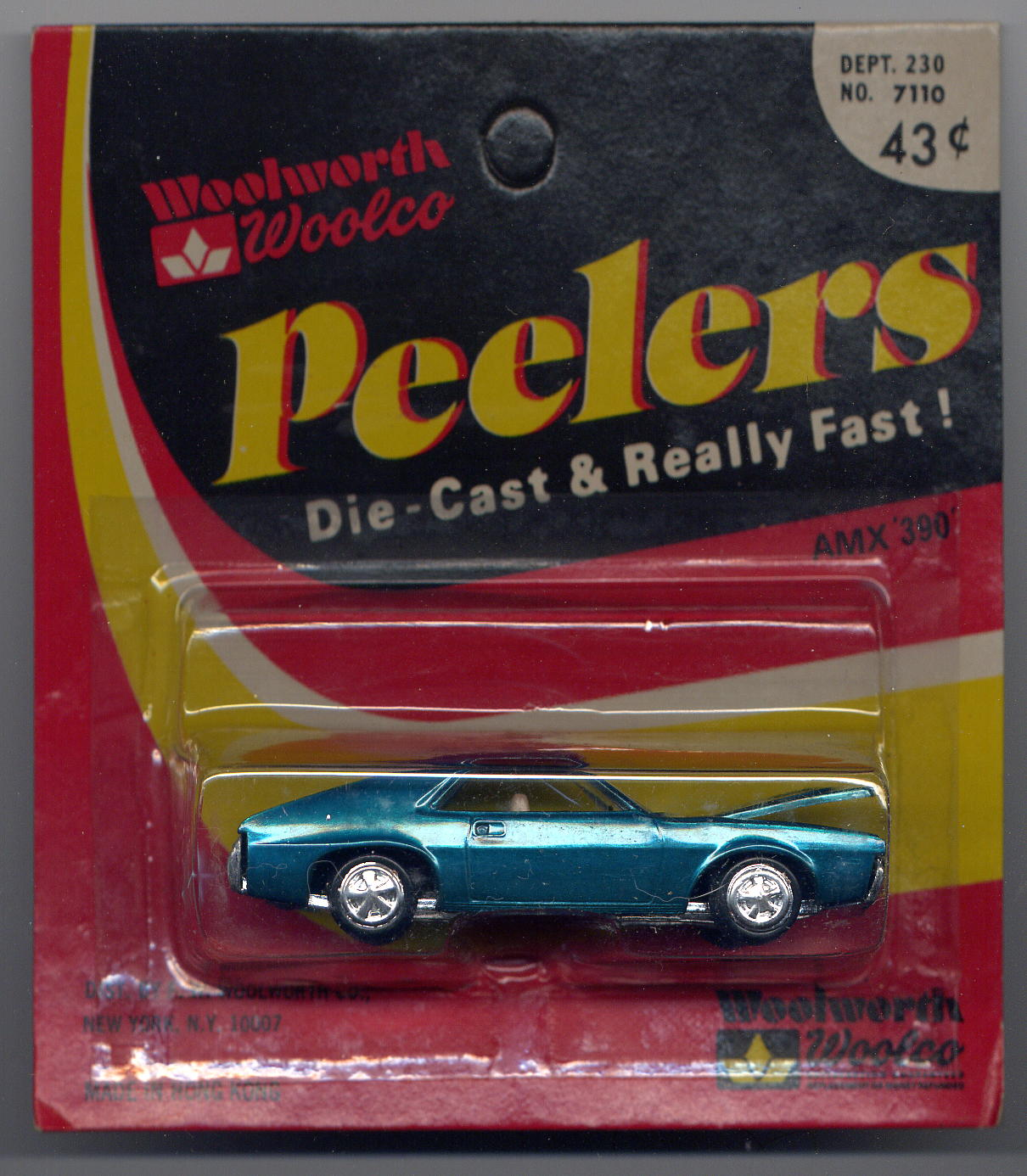
An example of a Playart AMC AMX in Woolworth's "Peelers" packaging.

Playart (the name in all lower case with a larger "a" in "art" and dots in the bowls of the letters) die-cast cars were made in Hong Kong and mostly were distributed with the name Peelers, the in-house brand of toy cars for Woolworth. During the late 1970s and early 1980s, Sears sold blister packaged Playarts as Road Mates. McCrory stores had a line of Playart vehicles called Freewheelers. They were blister-packaged on a blue, white and yellow card. Another Playart blister package stated "Die cast metal - En metal moule", perhaps for the French market. In another twist the American distribution company for Playart was Model Power which focused on train accessories. The small sized cars were packaged under this name as Road Kings.

On another Playart series, the name was printed with each letter a separate color, on bright packages marketed as FASTWHEEL (see photo). The phrase "really fast - die cast" was also printed on these blister-paks and boxes with the checkered black and white background. Playart diecast cars were also packaged as Charmerz for New York distributor Charles Merzbach. These were marketed as Charmerz Super Singles and packaged in a blue blister card with many different vehicles listed on the back. The Playart name, however, did not accompany all toy packaging. Vehicle offerings were more clever than those of other Hong Kong and Chinese makers of the 1970s and 1980s. Marques such as a 1967 Eldorado, a Fiat X 1/9, a Rolls-Royce Corniche coupe, and a Lotus Elite were not necessarily unique in the diecast world, but taken as a whole the series was creative and model selections unique. Despite tooling origins, however, one gets the feeling that the makers of Playart cars were auto enthusiasts perhaps more than other toy manufacturers. For example, the Playart Plymouth Barracuda (a former Hot Wheels casting) is realistically labeled a Barracuda Formula S on its base, showing a more refined automotive knowledge by the model creators. On the other hand, however, the 1969 Mustang Coupe only says "Mustang" on its base.

== Diecast details ==
Playart's 1/64 scale diecast line had a complex identification system. Numbers can be found on Playart display posters, blister-paks, and, infrequently, on the vehicle base - which also carries the name of the vehicle. The existence of 48 vehicles have been confirmed from the above sources and examination of the bases of the earliest editions (see Appendix 1 below). These 48 were the original line-up. All of these vehicles can be found with one or both types of the "hub-cap" style wheel, inside a black plastic tire. The 'hub-cap' design was later replaced with an oversized, simpler, one-piece wheel with five silver triangular 'spokes'. A couple of other wheel styles were a thin, ridged, one-piece design with five trapezoids outlined in silver and a one-piece form with two concentric circles outlined in silver. These were designs for cars, but wheels on trucks and other vehicles were often distinct from these patterns. Most of the models in Appendix 2 are number above 7147 and can be found with the 5 spoke wheel.

Like Hot Wheels and Matchbox "Superfast", Playart cars had thin axle, fast spinning 'mag' wheels. Models released during the 1970s had metal bodies as well as metal bases which were usually painted 'chrome' with the unmistakable Playart script. Later 1970s models were released with glossy black enamel bases. Late 1970s and early 1980s releases mostly had plastic bases. Two notable rounded rivet heads affix the chassis to the body. The name of the car was present and the text said, "Made in Hong Kong".

Though the models were entirely unique castings, the appeared to be influenced by other diecast brands. The Thunderbird, Barracuda, and AMX are very similar to earlier Mattel Hot Wheels offerings. The Porsche 910, Man from Uncle Oldsmobile, Carabo and Alfa P33 are also similar to the Husky/Corgi Jr. dies or to larger-scale Corgi castings, as are the later Chevrolet Caprice and Opel Senator. The Jensen FF looks like a scaled-down version of the larger Dinky model, as is the Cadillac Eldorado. The designers may have referenced plastic model kits. One of these, the Mazda Rotary Coupe was initially identified on its base as Yamada Super Discmatic Rotary Coupe - the same name as the model kit series - apparently copying the brand name from the Yamada box instead of the Mazda name. It appears the Singapore firm Mandarin may have used some Playart dies for some of its truck models.

== Other cars and trucks ==
Playart offered other sizes of cars and various vehicles. A series of fire trucks in approximately HO scale was made, some of which were American LaFrance and Mack 4 to 6 inch in diecast often with ladders with as many as four segments. These ladders could extend to twice the length of the truck. Many Playart trucks including many of these fire vehicles, later ended up as selections as Model Power toy models which were often sold intended for use with train sets. On Model Power packaging, there was usually no reference to Playart.

A range of 1:43 scale cars was offered. Some of these were a bit more crude than the smaller sized cars. For example, a late 1970s Toyota Celica fastback was a bit more rough and toy-like than other Playart offerings.

Some offerings were in plastic. Cars in 1:20 scale (or about 8 inches long) were also produced. One was a Porsche 914, which, as seen above, also appeared in the small scale. Another nice car was an almost promo-like 1:24 scale plastic 1968-1970 Rover V8 which appeared in both police and fire car versions. Body detail was slightly generalized, but the proportions were near perfect. The car was motorized with a front rotating wheeled motor and illuminated headlights. Tires were rubber. A couple of slot cars with track were also produced.

== Trains and planes ==
Uniqueness in offerings and choice of individual vehicles was always interesting. A line of miniature tanks was produced. Playart trains were mostly HO scale. Models varied from coal-fired steam engines from the late 1800s to modern engines from the 1950s and 1960s, including electric coaches. A variety of passenger coaches from varied eras were also featured. This included replicas of the Japanese hi-speed Shinkansen. Many were copies of Lima brand trains from Italy. These trains were also sold under the brand names of Model Power and Tomy (Japan).

Playart's airplane line was the 'Fastwing' series. These were mostly diecast. There was a larger (1/148 scale) and a smaller (1/215 scale) size. Several creative models were made from different eras, like the German Bf 110 and ME 410. Apparently, replicas of the McDonnell-Douglas DC-8, Boeing 314 Clipper, Boeing 727, and Vickers VC-10 were also produced. Other World War II planes were the Lockheed P-38 Lightning, German Stuka fighter, British Spitfire, and the F4U Corsair.
