= Jensen C-V8 =

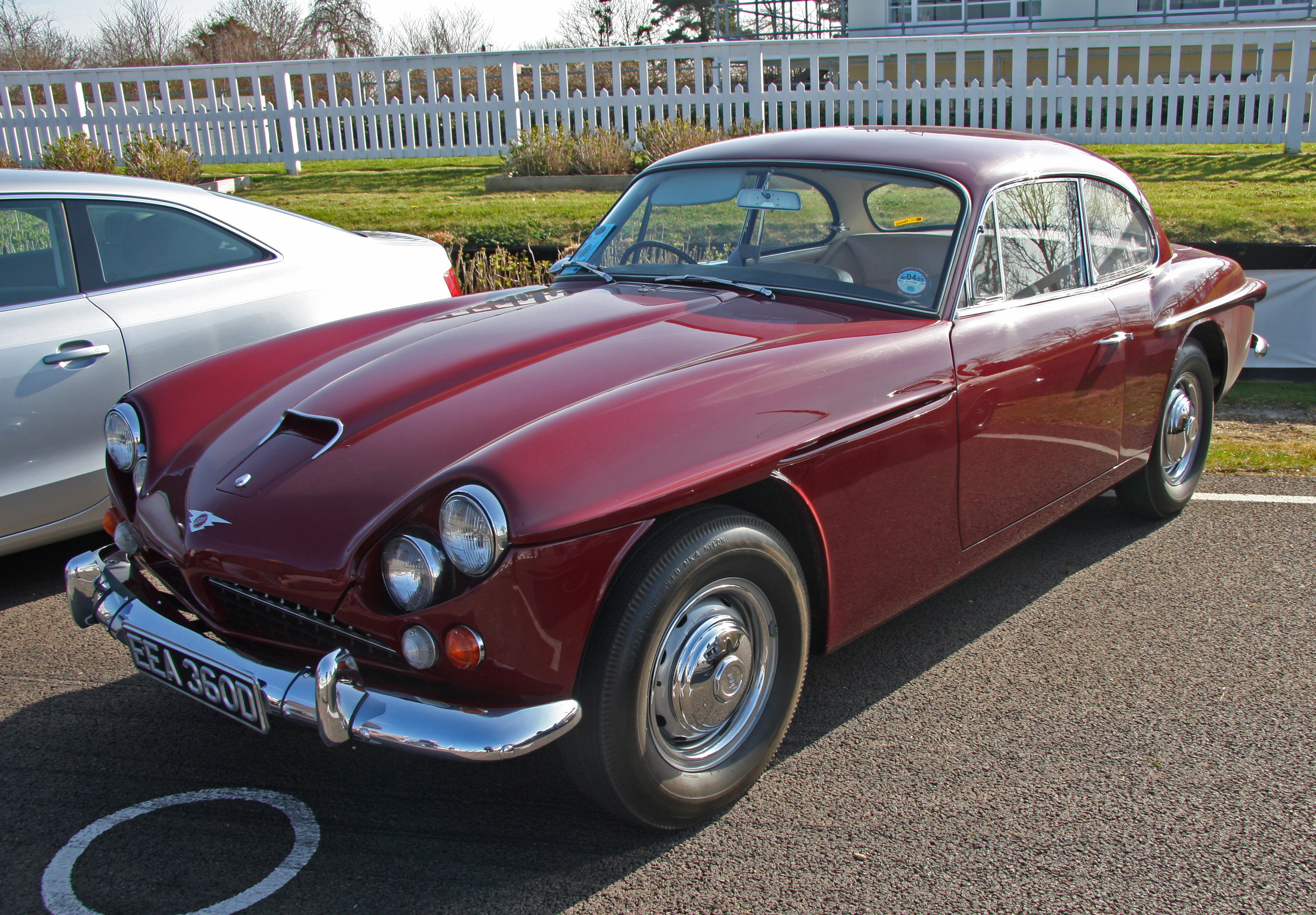

Overview
- Manufacturer: Jensen
- Production: 1962–1966; 499 built
- Assembly: West Bromwich, England
- Designer: Eric Neale

Body and chassis
- Class: Grand tourer
- Body style: 2-door coupé
- Layout: Front mid-engine, rear-wheel-drive

Powertrain
- Engine: 361 cu in (5.9 L) Golden Commando V8; 383 cu in (6.3 L) Golden Commando V8
- Transmission: 4-speed manual; 3-speed automatic

Dimensions
- Wheelbase: 105 in (2,667 mm)
- Length: 184 in (4,674 mm)
- Width: 67 in (1,702 mm)

Chronology
- Predecessor: Jensen 541S
- Successor: Jensen Interceptor

The Jensen C-V8 is a four-seater GT car produced by Jensen Motors between 1962 and 1966.

Launched in October 1962, the C-V8 series had fibreglass bodywork with aluminium door skins, as did the preceding 541 series.

All C-V8s used big-block engines sourced from Chrysler; first the 361 and then, from 1964, the 330 bhp (246 kW) 383 in³. Most of the cars had a three-speed Chrysler Torqueflite automatic transmission, but seven Mk2 C-V8s were produced with the 6-litre engine and four-speed manual gearbox, followed by two manual Mk3s. The engine is entirely set back behind the front axle line, which makes the C-V8 a front-mid-engined car. While the great majority of C-V8s were made in right-hand drive (RHD), ten were made in left-hand drive (LHD).

The C-V8 was one of the fastest production four-seaters of its era. The Mk II, capable of 136 mph (219 km/h), ran a quarter-mile (≈400 m) in 14.6 seconds and accelerated from 0–60 mph (97 km/h) in 6.7 seconds. This 0-60 mph time was roughly as quick as the Lamborghini Miura, and quicker than many performance cars of the period such as the Aston Martin DB5 and Jaguar E Type.

The upgraded Mk II, introduced in October 1963, had Armstrong Selectaride electronically adjustable rear dampers and minor styling changes. Changes on the Mk III, the final version of the series, which was introduced in June 1965, included a minor reduction in overall length, a deeper windscreen, equal-sized headlamps without chrome bezels, improved interior ventilation, a wood-veneer dashboard, the addition of overriders to the bumpers, and a dual-circuit braking system.

The factory made two convertibles: a cabriolet, and a sedanca that opened only above the front seats. The 1963 Sedanca was featured in an article by Paul Walton in the June 2008 issue of Ruoteclassiche, an Italian classic car magazine.

The front of the C-V8 was initially styled with covered headlamps as a key element of the design, similar to those on the Ferrari 275 GTB and Jaguar E-type Series 2. However, because of concerns that they might reduce the effectiveness of the headlamps, the covers were deleted for the production cars. Consequently, the C-V8's front-end appearance was considered compromised and controversial for decades. Some owners have since fitted headlight covers to their cars to return them to the original styling intended by the car's designer, Eric Neale. The model was discontinued in 1966 after a total production run of 500. The fibreglass body and the fact that the twin-tube frame was set in from the car's perimeter have contributed to the model's comparatively high survival rate.

One prototype C-V8 FF was fitted with four-wheel drive and an anti-lock braking system. It was used for development of the Jensen FF which was the first non-all-terrain production car equipped with four-wheel drive

== Motorsport ==
The C-V8 was little used in motorsports, although a factory Jensen used the services of a team of racing drivers, including Roy Salvadori to take the Commanders Cup 4-hour endurance events at Snetterton race course in MKIII C-V8 in 1965. More recently a Jensen C-V8 has been one of the most awarded cars in Tarmac Classic Rallying, with over 120 trophies including multiple wins and podiums in Targa Tasmania, Classic Adelaide and Targa High Country (Outright and Handicap) and several championship series wins.

In 2015 a Jensen C-V8 Mk II started to be modified with the aim of becoming the first Jensen to set a speed record on Speed Week 2018.

In 1964 a Jensen C-V8 towed a 400, Alpine and Musketeer Caravan at over 100 mph at Duxford Aerodrome. The Musketeer tow set the world Record at just over 102 mph as stated in Caravans: The Illustrated History from 1960 By Andrew Jenkinson

== In popular culture ==
A C-V8 Mk II was featured in the 1965 to 1966 ITC television series The Baron. Famous owners of Jensen C-V8s include actor Sean Connery of James Bond fame who owned a MKII Reg AUW 70B, the pop star Susan Maughan, the guitarist Dave Hill from the glam-rock band Slade whose car carried the registration YOB 1 and Sir Greg Knight MP, the Chair of the All Party Parliamentary Historic Vehicles Group.

A C-V8 was featured in the 2015 BBC television series London Spy driven by the character Scottie. One was also featured in series 4 episode 5 of Minder. It was driven by Jimmy Nail and had registration number 324 PE.

== Gallery ==
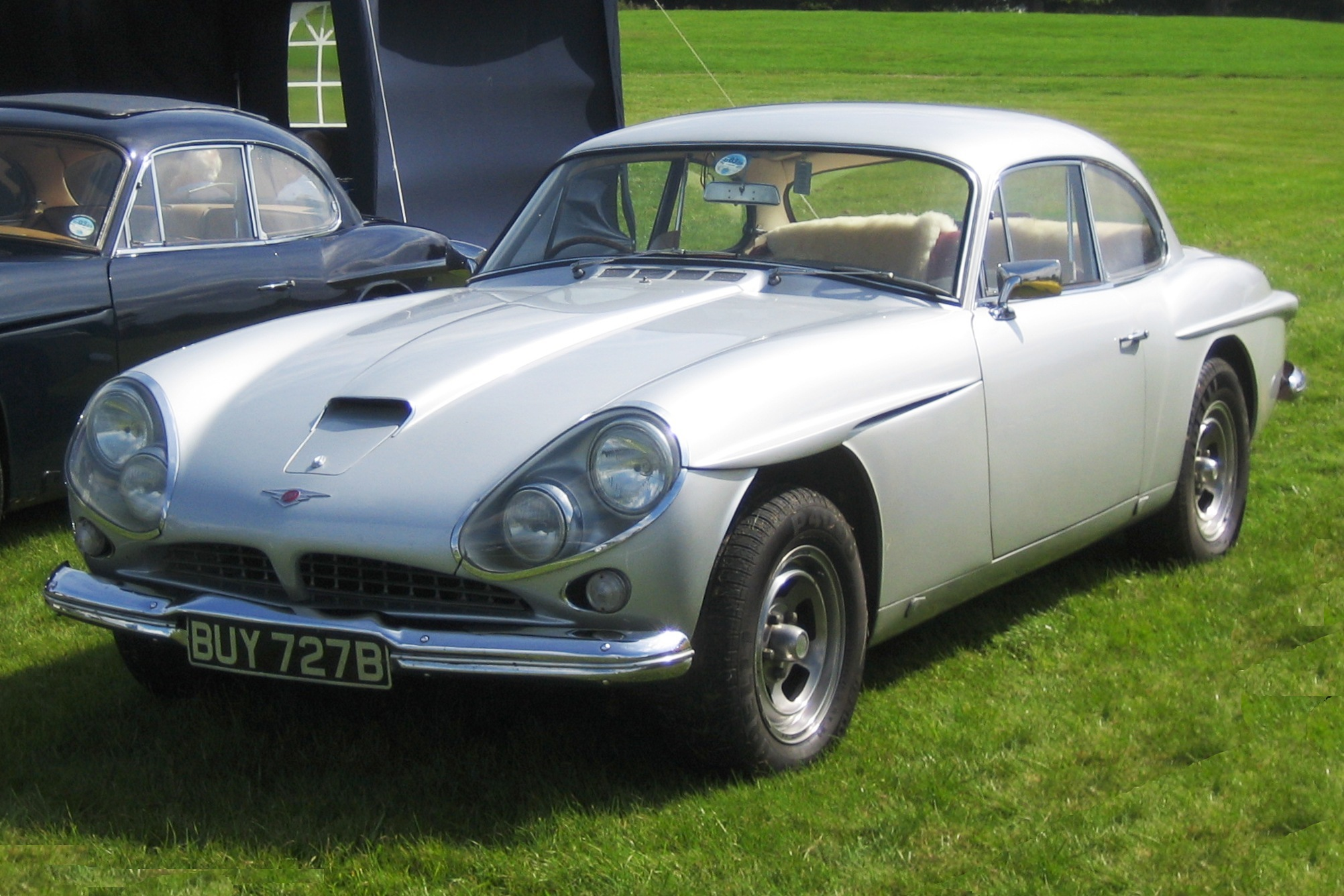
Jensen C-V8 with headlight covers fitted

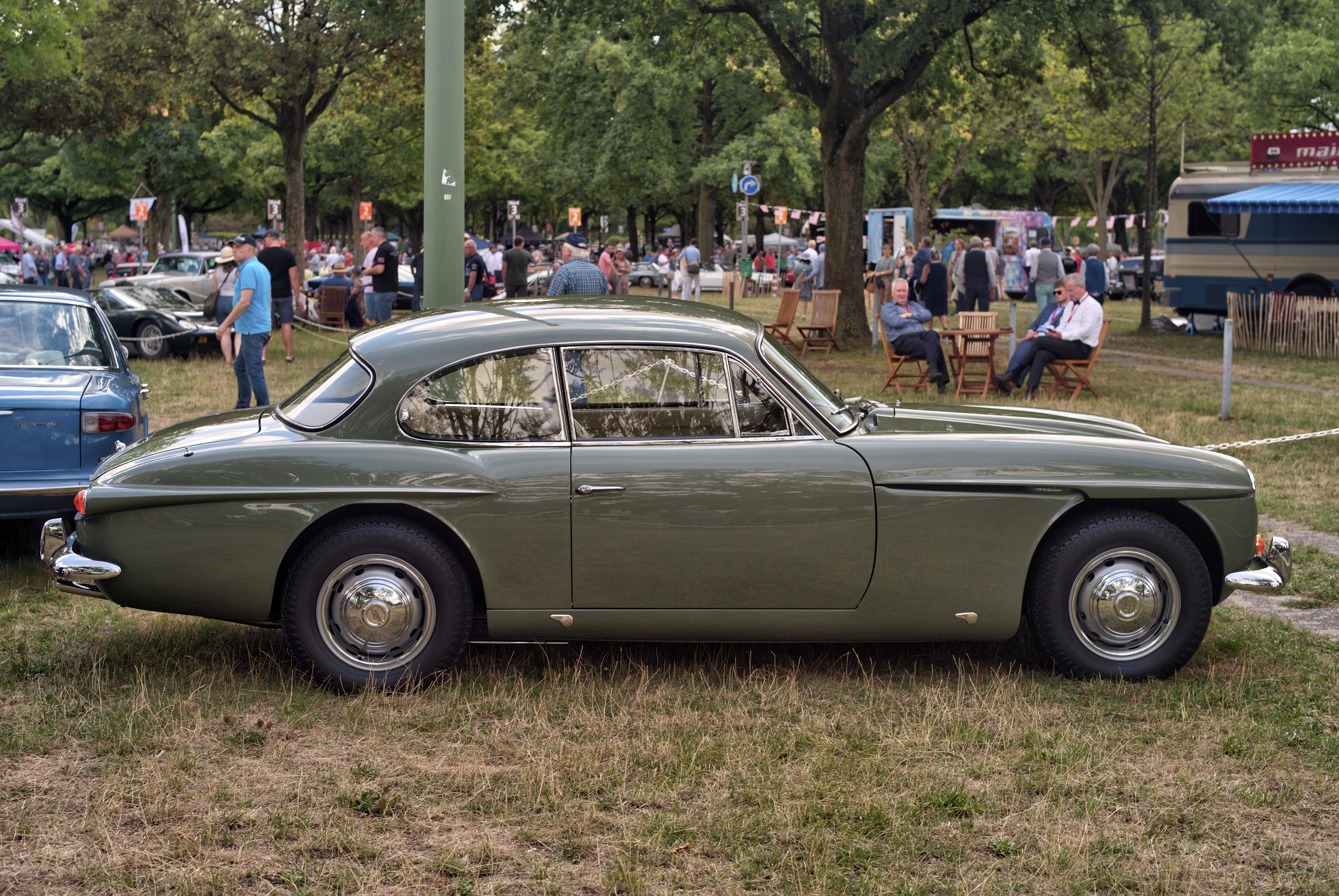
Jensen C-V8 side

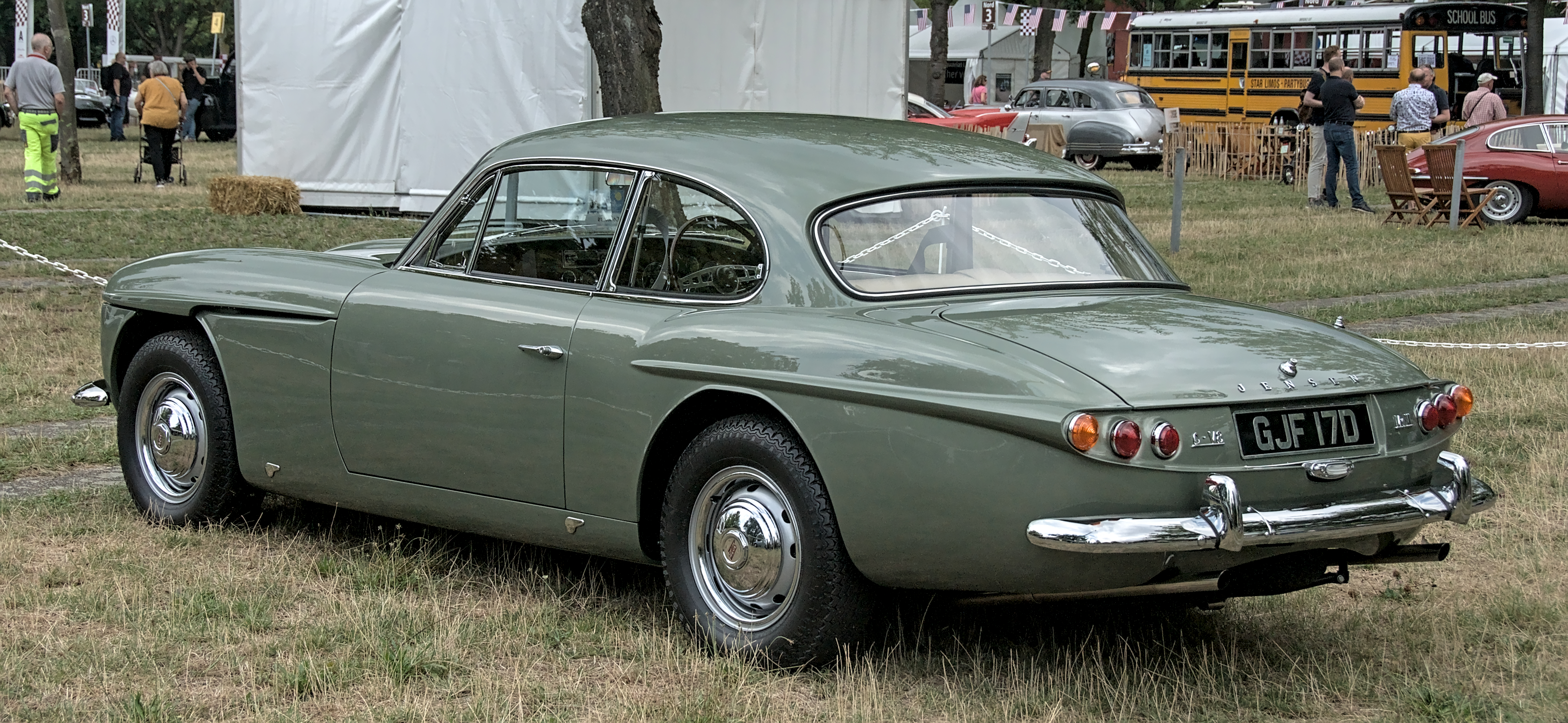
Jensen C-V8 rear
