= Leonard Lord =

English automotive engineer and industrialist

The Right Honourable The Lord Lambury
- Born: 15 November 1896
- Died: 13 September 1967 (aged 70)
- Occupation: Automobile executive
- Known for: Co-founding and leading British Motor Corporation

Leonard Percy Lord, 1st Baron Lambury KBE (15 November 1896 – 13 September 1967) was a captain of the British motor industry.

== Background and education ==
Leonard Percy Lord was born on 16 November 1896 in Coventry and was the youngest child in his family. Lord was the son of William Lord, of Coventry, and Emma, daughter of George Swain. He was educated at Bablake School, Coventry. The school had a fully equipped carpenter's workshop and a working forge. Leonard did well enough and his fees, like many of the Bablake's boys, were paid for by Coventry Education Committee. He left the school at the age of 16 after his father's death. He used the technical training he had received at school to get a job at Courtaulds as a jig draughtsman.

== Automotive career ==
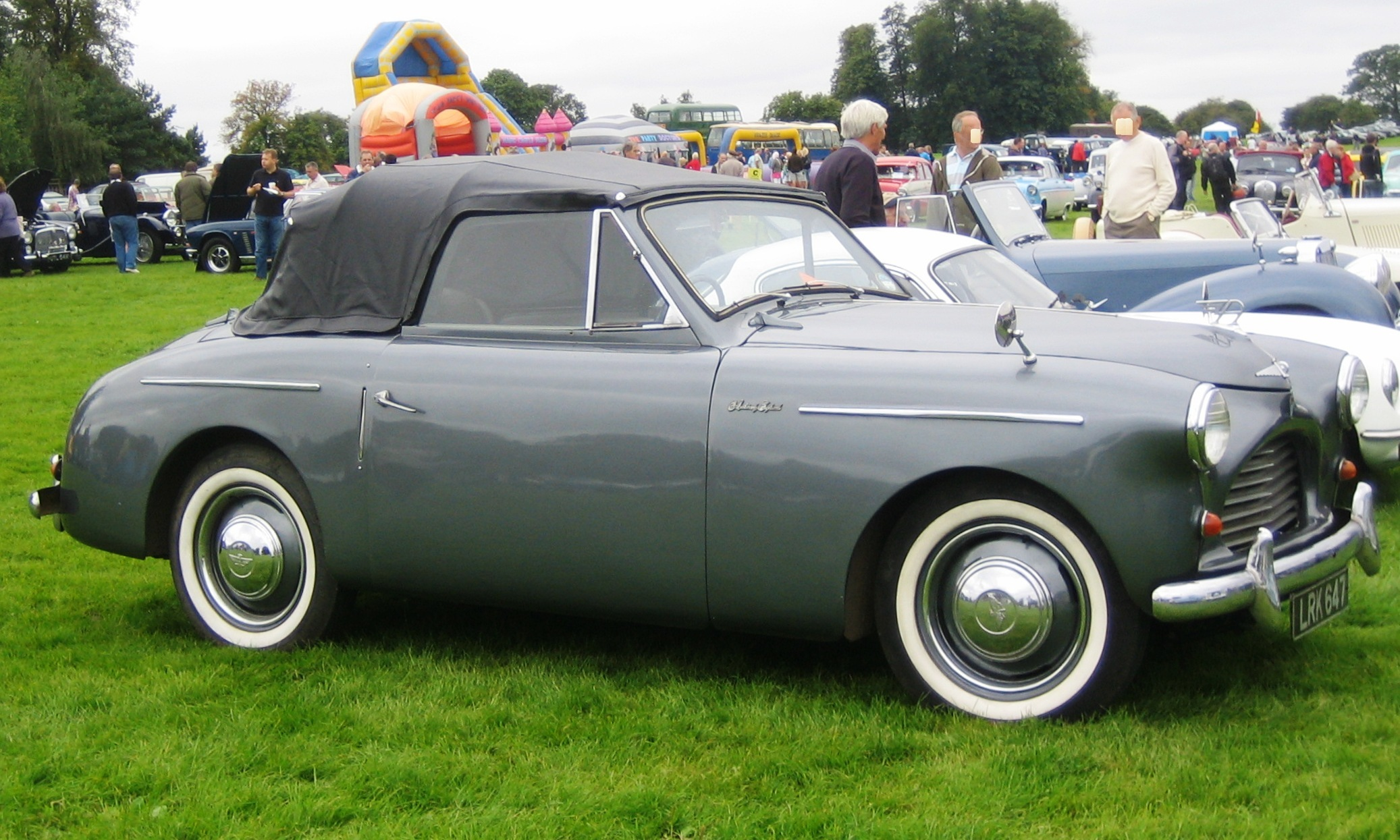
Austin A40 Sports, ca 1951, designed by Eric Neale and manufactured by Austin Motor Company in conjunction with Jensen Motors. The car originated when Leonard Lord, upon seeing the Jensen Interceptor, requested that Jensen develop a body that could use the A40 mechanicals.

He moved to Vickers, before joining Coventry Ordnance Works, a munitions factory in Coventry, for the duration of the First World War. Lord worked for a number of engineering firms after the war. After 1918 Lord worked in a manufacturing plant for Daimler engines. In 1923 he moved to Morris Motors Limited where he was involved in rationalising all stages of the production process. In 1927 Morris bought Wolseley Motors Limited, and Lord was transferred there in order to modernise their production equipment. In 1932 Lord was promoted to General Manager at Morris, working from the Cowley factory. He was so effective that in 1933 William Morris made him Managing Director of Morris Motors itself. By 1934 Morris was a multi-millionaire bearing the title Lord Nuffield in recognition of his generous charitable donations and his business empire had become the Nuffield Organization. In August 1936 Leonard resigned. In 1937 Nuffield appointed his now unemployed friend as manager of the Nuffield Trust for Special Areas with £2 million for distribution to development schemes benefitting areas in economic distress. But Lord was looking for a way back into the industry and in 1938 after many years of conflict with William Morris, Lord left to join Morris's chief competitor, the Austin Motor Company.

At that time, Herbert Austin was looking for somebody to direct his company, his only son having been killed during the war. Ultimately, Lord was selected to manage the company. Lord Austin died in 1941 and Lord became the most powerful man in the company. With the advent of the Second World War, Austin converted from civil to military production, in particular ambulances and government vehicles. After the war, Lord became Chairman of Austin and the company resumed civil motor-vehicle production in 1946. He promoted his company and set up plants in Canada, Australia, Argentina, South Africa and Mexico. In 1954 he was appointed a Knight Commander of the Order of the British Empire (KBE). Through further mergers and acquisitions, including the huge 1952 merger with his former employer the Nuffield Organization (with Lord's Austin very much the senior partner), Lord ultimately became president of the British Motor Corporation. Following its creation, Lord often joked that BMC stood for, "Bugger My Competitors". On 26 March 1962 he was raised to the peerage as Baron Lambury, of Northfield in the County of Warwick.

== Death ==
Leonard Lord died in 1967, at the age of 70, during the discussions which ultimately formed British Leyland. The editor of Commercial Motor magazine, H. Brian Cottee, in an obituary written shortly after Lord's death opined that he was "at heart a production engineer, and an immensely able one at that", and "one of the great engineer-administrators of the motor industry". Cottee described him as "tough, capable, sometimes blunt" with "a wry humour and a sometimes surprising humility".

== Legacy ==
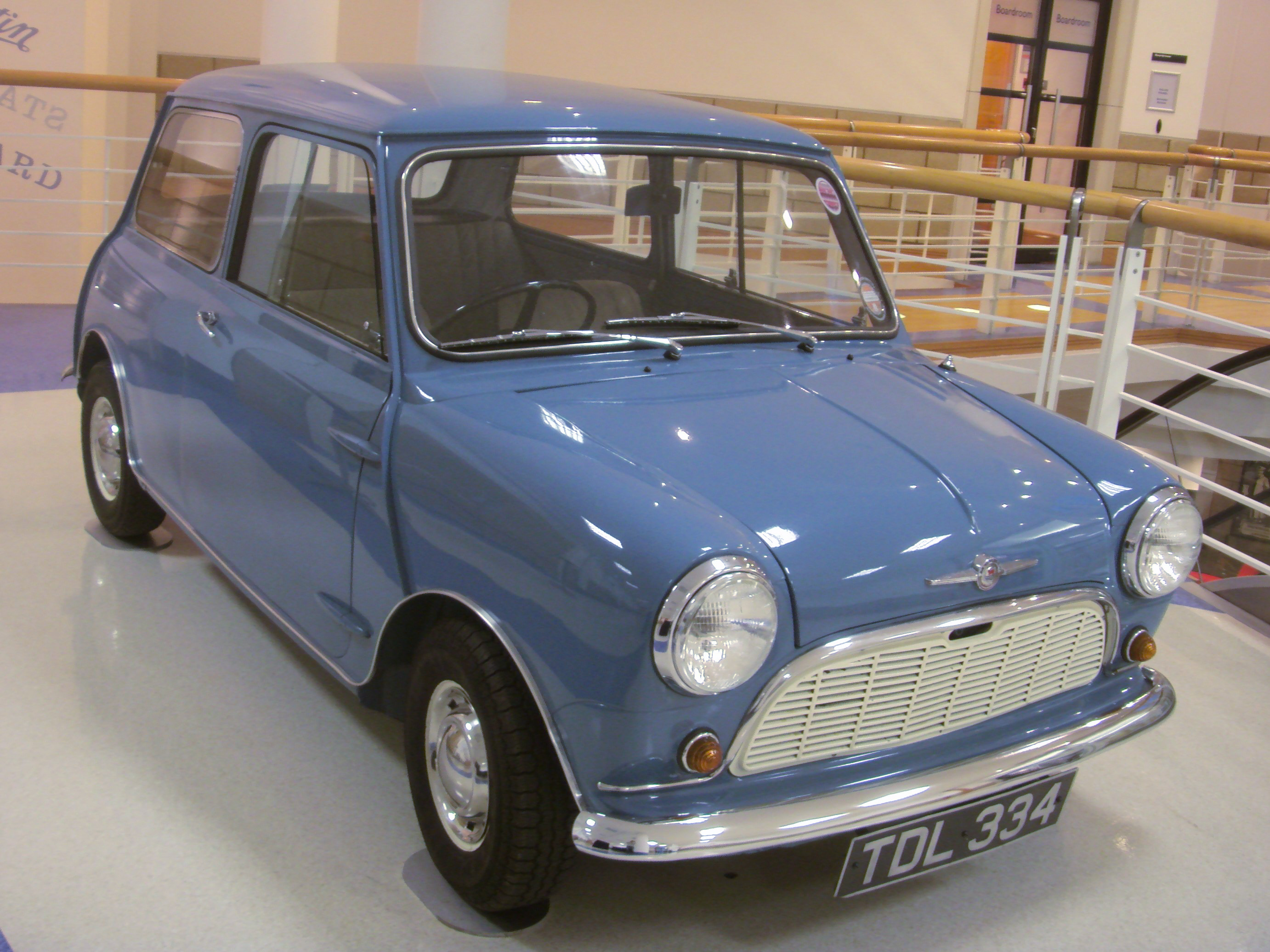
Morris Mini-Minor designed by Alec Issigonis by order of Leonard Lord runner-up to Model T Ford for car of the century

Although Lord had success in his early career, his legacy was a sprawling and unprofitable product range, weak distribution and feeble management at British Leyland – ills which took their toll on the company.

He has contributed in the essential modernization of production methods at both Cowley and Longbridge, making the British motor industry compatible in world markets. He developed an export output of Britain's post-war economics. Finally, though he initiated the union of the industry's two major rivals, it was difficult to ensure that the two elements worked in harmony.

In a review of the Longbridge operation, Graham Searjeant, Financial Editor of The Times (31 May 2007) notes that Lord was a "foul-mouthed, hard-driving production man". Searjeant credits some of the failures at Longbridge to Lord's "lack of vision" and the "inadequacy" of his protégé-successor, George Harriman. Lord's biographer, Martyn Nutland, thinks this is unfair, and that Lord dealt imaginatively with the inescapable circumstances of the day. It was Lord who persuaded Alec Issigonis to rejoin BMC to create what became the Mini and the 1100, Austin/BMC's two most successful products. That Issigonis had the freedom to create such revolutionary cars is thanks to the mandate given to him by Lord. Gillian Bardsley, Archivist of the British Motor Heritage Trust, in her biography of Alec Issigonis, credits Lord with the vision that BMC needed an entirely new range of cars if it was to remain competitive into the 1960s.

== Personal life ==
Lord married Ethel Lily, daughter of George Horton, in 1921. They had three daughters.

Lord, who had been raised to the peerage as Baron Lambury in 1962, died in September 1967, aged 70. With Lord Lambury having no son, the barony became extinct upon his death.

Peerage of the United Kingdom
New creation	Baron Lambury; 1962–1967	Extinct
