= Austin D-Series engine =

Austin D-series Austin K-series

Overview
- Manufacturer: Austin Motor Company
- Designer: Leonard Lord
- Production: 1939–1968

Layout
- Configuration: straight-6
- Displacement: 211.1 cu in (3,460 cc); 243.8 cu in (3,995 cc)
- Cylinder bore: 3 11/32 in (84.9 mm); 3 7/16 in (87.3 mm)
- Piston stroke: 4 in (101.6 mm); 4 3/8 in (111.1 mm)
- Cylinder block material: Cast iron
- Cylinder head material: Cast iron
- Valvetrain: OHV, two valves per cylinder

Combustion
- Fuel system: Carburettor
- Fuel type: petrol
- Oil system: Pressurized
- Cooling system: water-cooled

Output
- Power output: 3,460 cc: 60 to 68 bhp (45 to 51 kW; 61 to 69 PS); 3,995 cc: 87 to 150 bhp (65 to 112 kW; 88 to 152 PS)

Chronology
- Predecessor: Austin 28 side-valve I6
- Successor: BMC C-Series engine

The Austin D and K series engines are a straight-six engine made by the British Austin Motor Company between 1939 and 1968. It was developed for the lorry market, but used in a number of automobiles in its later life. It was an overhead valve non-crossflow cylinder head design. Both block and head were made out of cast iron. All engines had a forged four main bearing crankshaft.

The engine was developed under the close watch of Austin chief Leonard Lord. The design was inspired by the Chevrolet Stovebolt engine, which was an inline six-cylinder used by General Motors' British subsidiary Bedford Vehicles. In the late 1930s, Austin decided to get into the 2-3 ton payload lorry market and in a crash development programme based the design on the basic architecture of the Chevrolet engine. Austin's improvements over the Chevrolet design included detachable-shell main and connecting rod bearings and pressurized lubrication. The initial design had an engine displacement of 3460 cc. During the Second World War, Austin increased the bore and stroke to enlarge it to 3995 cc; it produced 87 bhp (65 kW). The larger engine was put in military trucks beginning in 1940. Both engine sizes were in production after the war. When the carburettor was changed from Zenith to Stromberg, it produced 100 bhp (75 kW).

Truck engines had K designations and car engines had D designations.

== Applications ==
The engine was first used in the Austin K30 light truck and Austin K2/Y military ambulance 1939. After the war, it continued to power the later Austin Loadstar 1-ton truck and the 4x4 variant K9.

Post war, it went on to power a number of cars such as the Austin Sheerline and Princess luxury vehicles, Jensen Interceptor and Jensen 541. The last car to have it was the 1968 DM4 Vanden Plas Princess Limousine.

There were also four-cylinder engines based on the D-Series six cylinder engine in various capacities using common parts from 2199-2660cc petrol to 2178-2520cc diesel known initially as the 2.2-litre Austin BS1 OHV. They powered cars such as the Austin 16 hp, A70 Hampshire and Hereford, A90 Atlantic, the Austin-Healey 100-4 and the Austin Gipsy, a generation of commercial vans beginning with the Austin K8, as well as some models of the iconic London black taxi such as the Austin FX3 and Austin FX4.

At some point during Michael Edwardes' restructuring of British Leyland, the plant producing the engine was sold off to Standard Motor Products of India where it was used to power a locally-built Standard Atlas based commercial van known as the Standard Twenty and also the Standard 2000 (a rebadged Rover SD1). During the 1980s, this engine was re-imported from India to be used in the refurbished Carbodies version of the Austin FX4 known as the FX4Q.

== See also ==
- BMC A-series engine
- BMC B-series engine
- BMC C-Series engine
