= Austin A40 Sports =

Overview
- Manufacturer: Austin (BMC)
- Production: 1950–1953
- Assembly: United Kingdom: West Bromwich (Jensen Motors: body); United Kingdom: Longbridge (Longbridge plant: final assembly)
- Designer: Eric Neale

Body and chassis
- Class: sports car
- Body style: 2-door convertible
- Related: Austin A40

Powertrain
- Engine: 1.2 L I4
- Transmission: 4-speed manual

Dimensions
- Wheelbase: 92.5 in (2,350 mm)
- Length: 159 in (4,039 mm)
- Width: 61 in (1,549 mm)
- Height: 57.5 in (1,460 mm)
- Curb weight: 19 long cwt (2,128.0 lb; 965.2 kg)

The Austin A40 Sports was introduced at the 1950 London Motor Show at Earls Court as a four-passenger, aluminium-bodied convertible variant of the Austin A40 – carrying the Austin of England monogram, bearing Austin's Flying A bonnet mascot hood ornament; designed and manufactured in conjunction with Jensen Motors and prioritizing touring comfort over outright sportiness.

Production of the A40 Sports began in November 1950 for model year 1951. By the time production ended in 1953, just over 4,000 had been manufactured.

== Overview ==
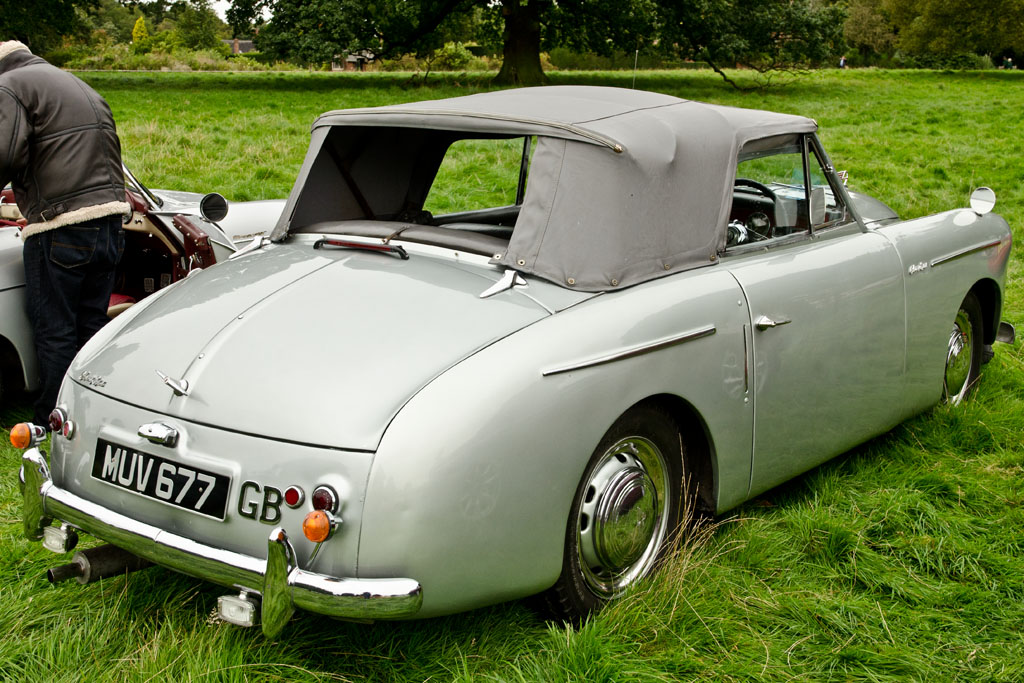
1952 A40 Sports rear view

As one in a series of collaborations between Austin and Jensen Motors of West Bromwich, the A40 Sports originated when Austin's chairman Leonard Lord saw the Jensen Interceptor and requested that Jensen develop a body that could use the A40 mechanicals. The resulting body-on-frame A40 Sports was designed by Eric Neale, a stylist who had joined Jensen in 1946 after working at Wolseley Motors. During production, A40 Sports bodies were built by Jensen and transported to Austin's Longbridge plant for final assembly.

Per Lord's intention, the A40 Sports was based on the mechanicals of the Austin A40 Devon, though the centre section of the chassis was boxed to provide rigidity for the open body. The A40 Sports also employed a twin-SU carburettor version of the 1.2 L engine producing 46 bhp (34 kW) rather than 42 bhp (31 kW). Gear selection was originally via a floor-mounted lever. Steering was worm and roller type, front suspension was independent coil springs with rigid beam axle and semi-elliptic leaf springs at the rear.

Production of the A40 Sports occurred in two series. The initial GD2 Series began in November 1950 and featured a floor gear change and dashboard identical to that of the Devon. The later GD3 Series began production in August 1951 and ended in April 1953, featuring a steering-column gear change, full hydraulic brakes, and a revised dash with a centred instrument panel. 4,011 A40 Sports were manufactured.

== Performance ==
The A40 Sports was easily able to maintain 50–55 mph (80–89 km/h) cruising speeds – as well as a top speed of 77.8 mph (125.2 km/h) as recorded by the British magazine The Motor in 1951 – and could accelerate from 0–60 mph (97 km/h) in 25.6 seconds. Tests achieved a fuel consumption of 29.3 miles per imperial gallon (9.6 L/100 km; 24.4 mpg_{‑US}).

Reporting similar performance figures, an Autocar road test in 1950 described the acceleration as "not startling, but more than adequate". The brakes and steering were commended, along with the "very good luggage space" and the "clear to read" instruments, but it was noted that a "considerable leg reach" was needed to use the "foot-operated dip switch" for the headlights.

In the United States – initially targeted as its primary market – the A40 was priced at about $2,200 (equivalent to $25,250, 2021). It was listed at about £818 in the UK, at a time when a mainstream middle market six-cylinder saloon, the Vauxhall Velox, was offered for £550 and Austin's own A40 saloon was offered for slightly more than £500.

== Round the world in 1951 ==
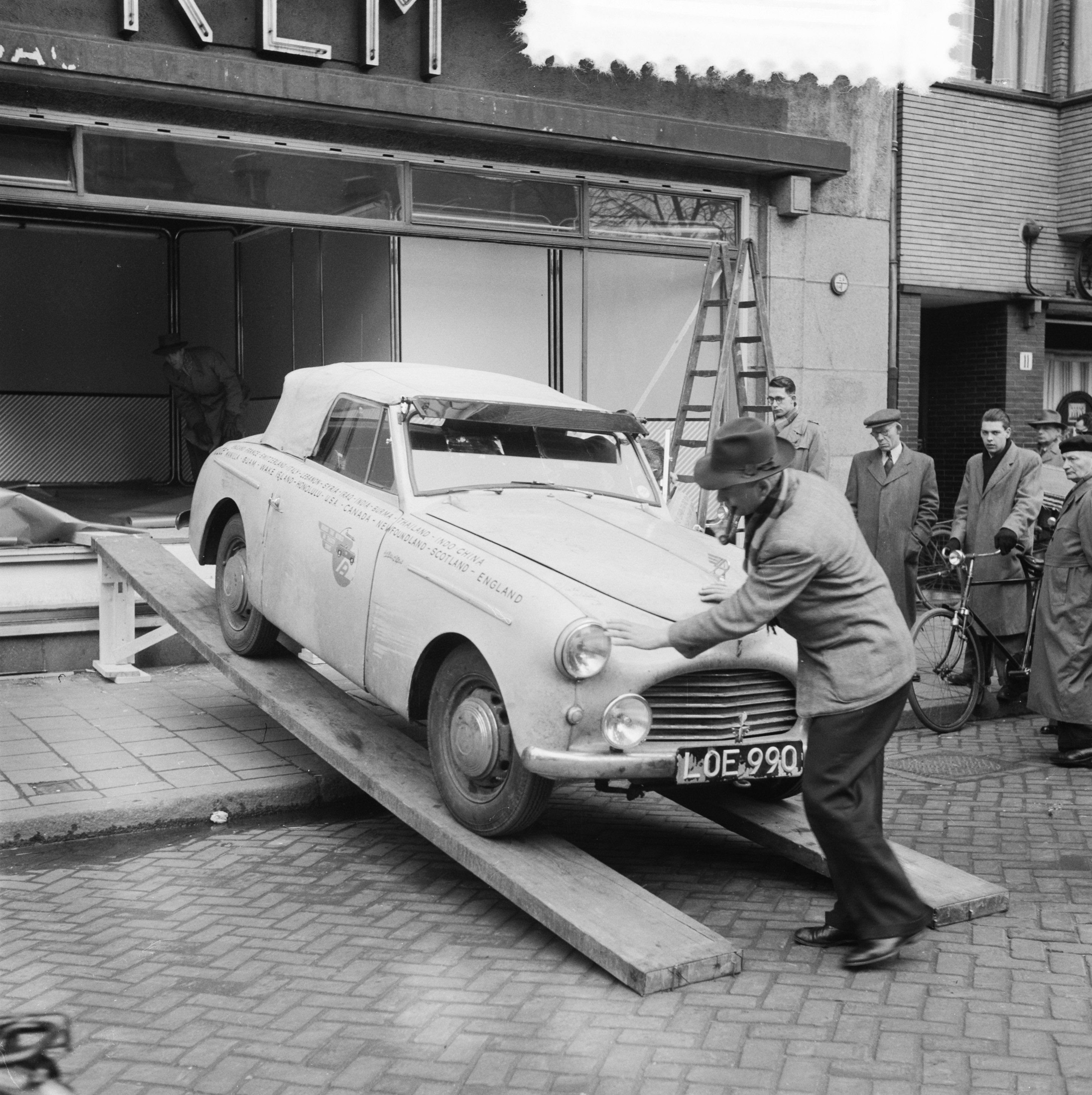
The Round-the-World A40 going on display in KLM's office

As a publicity stunt to promote the A40 Sports, Leonard Lord bet Alan Hess of Austin's publicity department that he could not drive round the world in 30 days in the car. In 1951 an A40 Sports driven by Hess achieved the round-the-world feat in 21 days rather than the planned 30 – with the assistance of a KLM cargo plane – covering about 10,000 land miles, averaging 475 miles per day and achieving 29mpg.
