= Jensen Interceptor (1950) =

British grand touring car of the 1950s

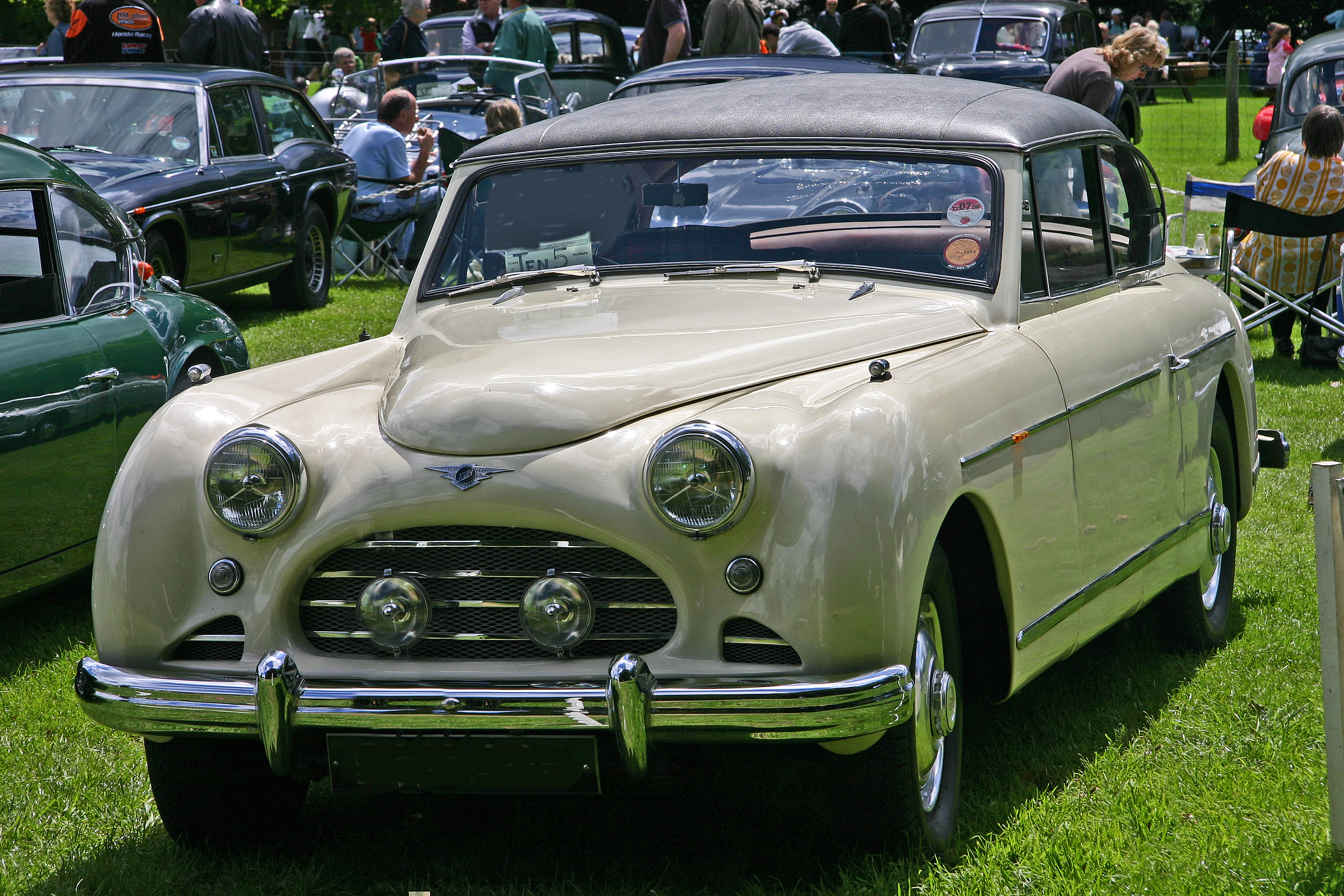

Overview
- Manufacturer: Jensen
- Production: 1950–1957; 88 produced
- Assembly: West Bromwich, England
- Designer: Eric Neale

Body and chassis
- Body style: 2-door, 4-seat saloon 2-door, 4-seat convertible 2-door, 4-seat sedanca

Powertrain
- Engine: 4.0 L Austin D-Series I6
- Transmission: 4-speed manual

Dimensions
- Wheelbase: 112 in (2,845 mm)
- Length: 183 in (4,648 mm)
- Width: 66 in (1,676 mm)
- Height: 58 in (1,473 mm)

Chronology
- Predecessor: Jensen PW
- Successor: Jensen 541

The Jensen Interceptor made its debut in 1950 as the second car made by Jensen Motors after World War II. The car was based on Austin components with a body built by Jensen and styled by Eric Neale. The 3,993 cc (4.0 L; 243.7 cu in) straight-six engine and transmission came from the Austin Sheerline and the chassis was a lengthened version of the one used on the Austin A70 with a modified version of the independent coil sprung suspension.

Production continued through 1957. Jensen later reused the name for a second-generation Jensen Interceptor, which debuted in 1966 and was revived several times after that.

== History ==
The Interceptor was launched as a convertible in a mix of aluminium and steel on a wood frame. The entire front section hinged forwards to give access to the engine. The wrap around rear window was made of rigid plastic (Perspex) and was arranged to drop down into a well for stowage when the top was lowered. In 1952 a hardtop version with fabric-covered roof was launched and a few sedanca versions were also made. Total production was 32 convertibles, 52 saloons and 4 sedancas.

The brakes used a mixed Girling hydraulic/mechanical system at first to be replaced by a full hydraulic system later. The four speed manual transmission gained optional overdrive in 1952. When the overdrive was fitted a lower, 3.77:1, rear axle gearing was used.

A convertible tested by The Motor in 1952 had a top speed of 95 mph (153 km/h) and could accelerate from 0-60 mph (97 km/h) in 17.8 seconds. A fuel consumption of 20.3 miles per gallon(imperial) was recorded.

In 1952 the car cost £2645 (including tax) on the home market. The overdrive was an extra £116.

In 1953 American race car legend Briggs Cunningham had a left hand drive Interceptor made with a 331 cu in (5.4 L), 180 bhp (134.2 kW) Chrysler "Firepower" hemi engine. With a top speed approaching 145 mph it was the second fastest production built car of 1955 behind the Mercedes Benz 300SL.

Jensen also made the Austin A40 Sports, a much smaller vehicle which somewhat resembled a scaled-down Interceptor.

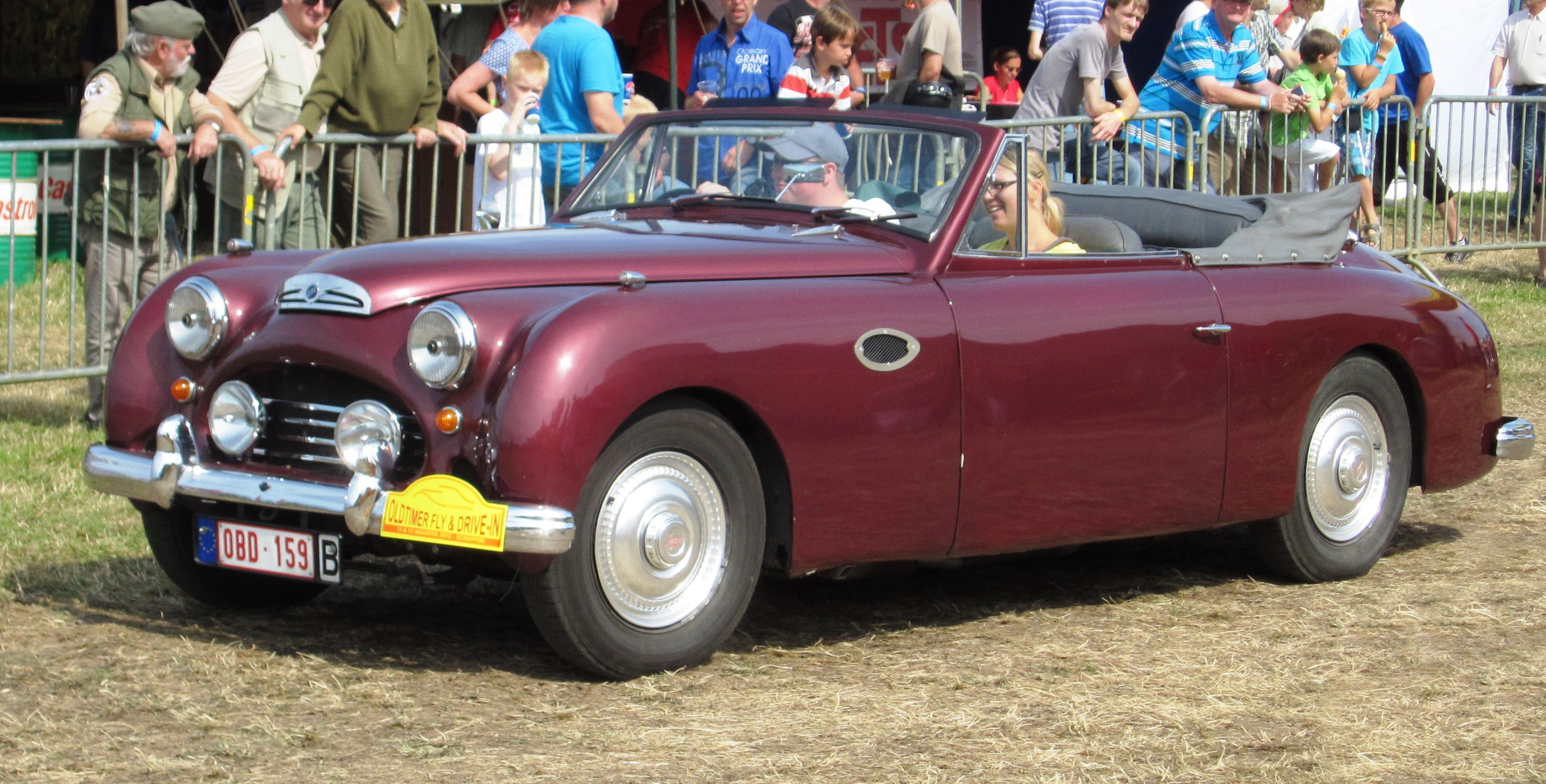
Jensen Interceptor 1951

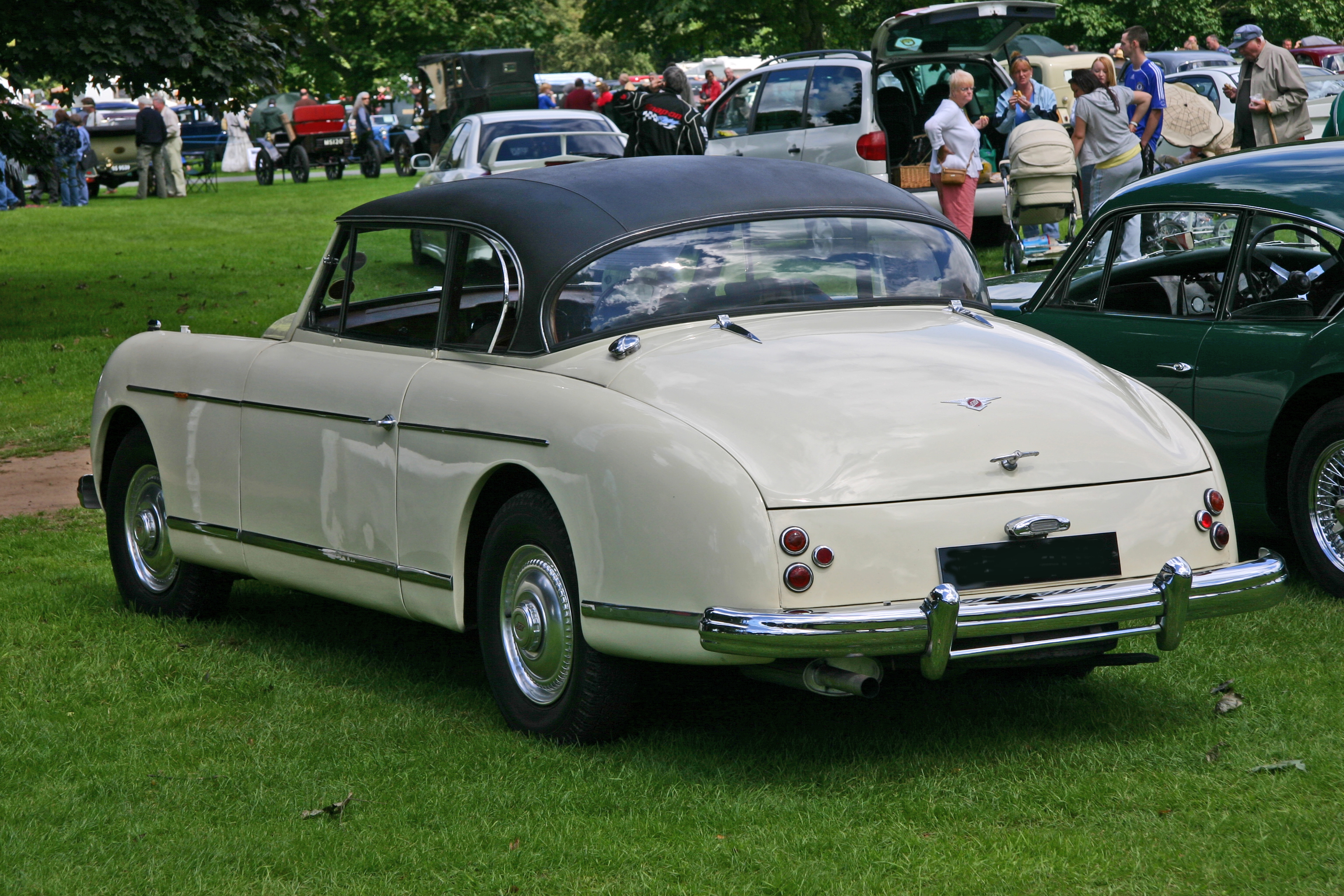
Jensen Interceptor 1954
