= Jensen Motors =

British manufacturer of sports cars and commercial vehicles

Jensen Motors Limited #00182205
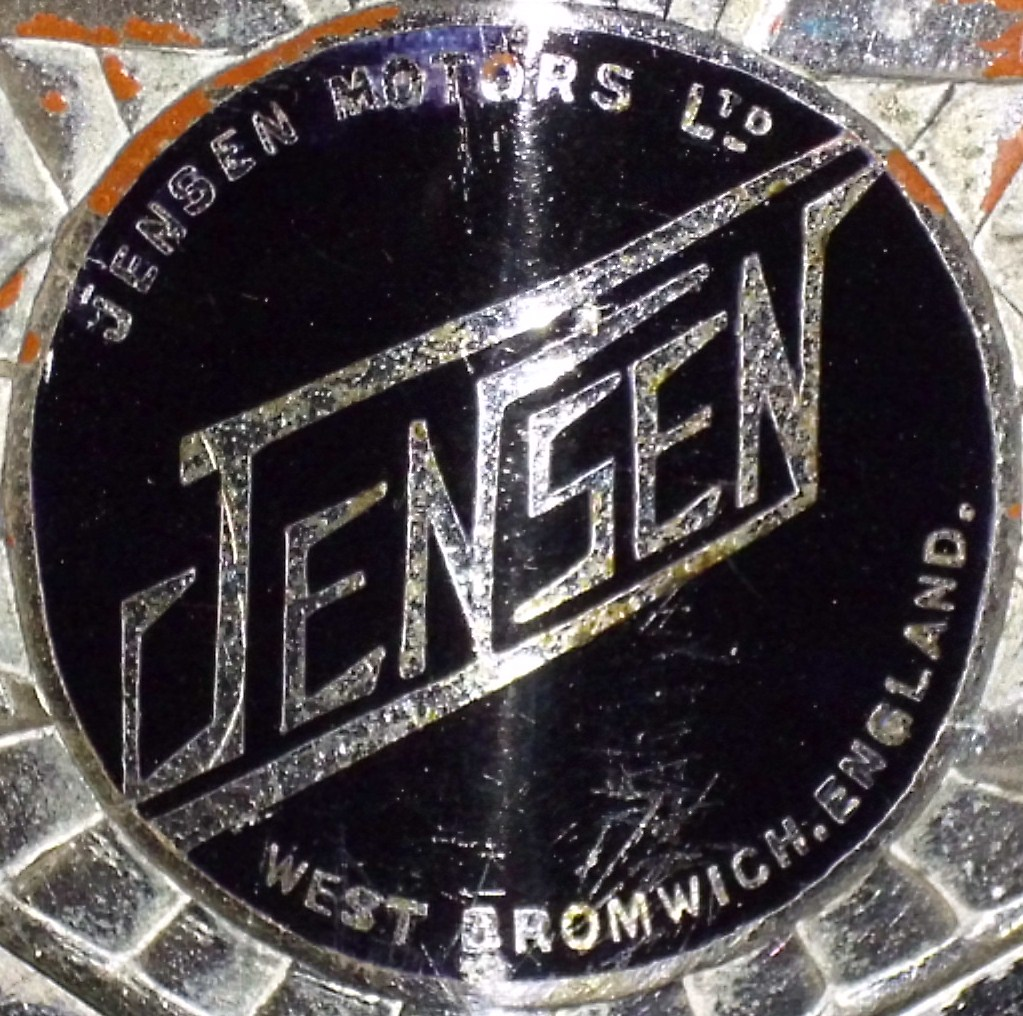
- Industry: Automotive
- Founded: 1922; 104 years ago (as W J Smith & Sons Limited)
- Defunct: July 2011 (ceased trading 1976, resumed trading in 1998)
- Fate: Dissolved 2011
- Headquarters: West Bromwich, England
- Key people: Richard and Alan Jensen
- Products: Automobiles

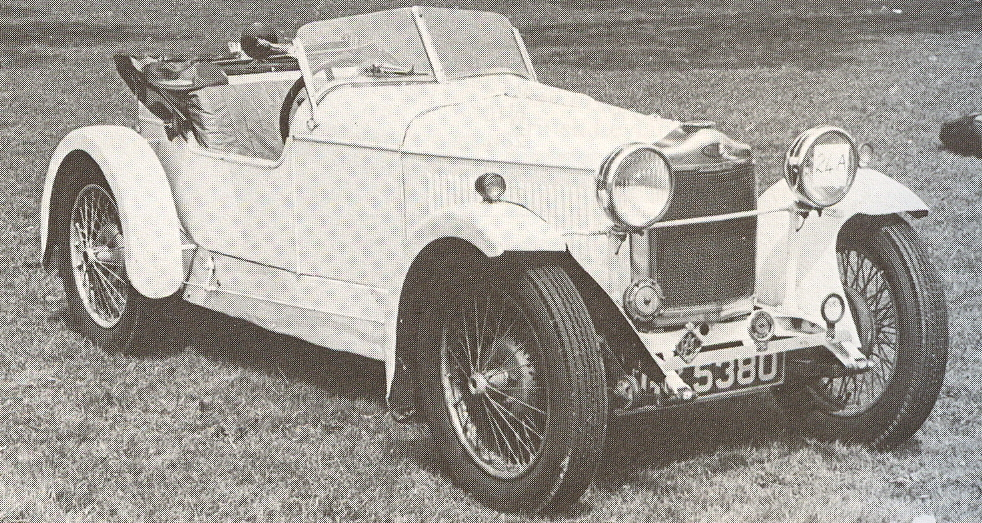
Alan Jensen's first Avon Special

Jensen Motors Limited was a British manufacturer of sports cars and commercial vehicles in West Bromwich, England. Brothers Alan and Richard Jensen gave the new name Jensen Motors Limited to the commercial and sports-car body-making business of W J Smith & Sons Limited in 1934. It ceased trading in 1976. Though trading would resume in 1998, Jensen Motors Limited was dissolved on 30 July 2011.

Jensen Motors built specialist car bodies for major manufacturers alongside vehicles of their own design, using engines and mechanicals sourced from Ford, Austin, and Chrysler.

The rights to Jensen's trademarks were bought with the company, and it briefly operated in Speke, Liverpool, from 1998 to 2002. Under subsequent owners, a new version of the Jensen Interceptor was announced in 2011. It was planned to bring the manufacture of that new model back to the former Jaguar motor plant in Browns Lane, Coventry.

== Jensen brothers ==
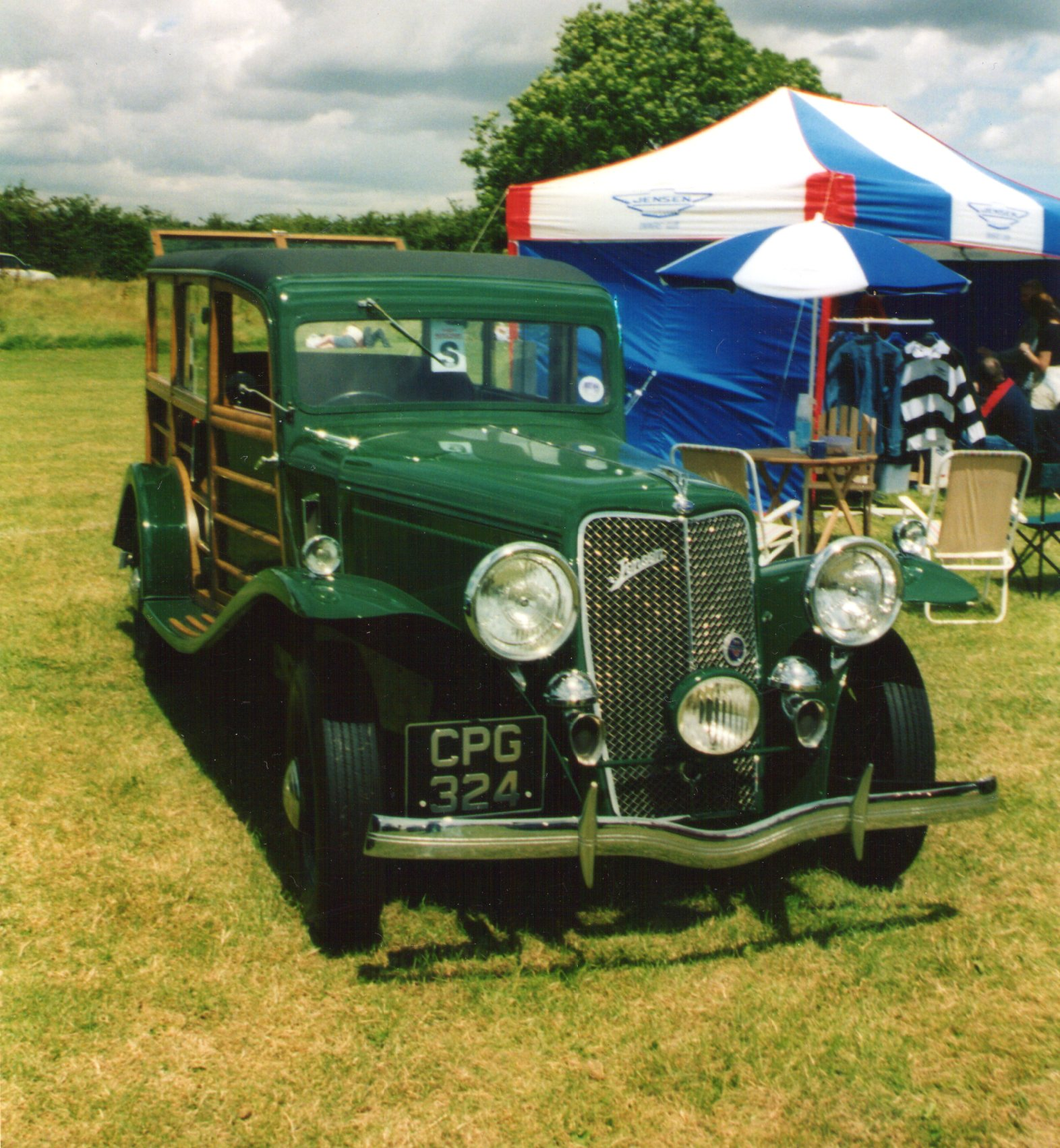
1935 Jensen-Ford "woodie" Shooting brake

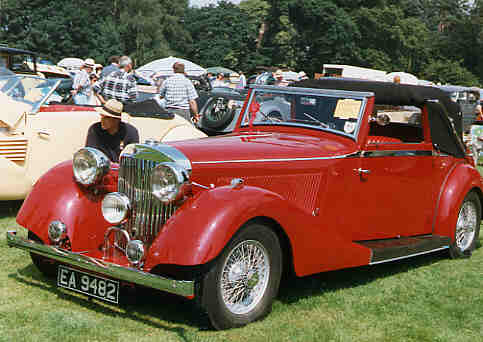
1938 Jensen S-type drophead, 3.5 litre

In 1926, young Alan Jensen (1906-1994) and his brother Richard Jensen (1909-1977) (Note: Frank Alan Jensen and Richard Arthur Jensen) built a new boat-tailed sporting body on one of the first Chummy baby Austins. It was seen by Alfred Herbert Wilde (1891–1930), chief engineer of Standard Motor Company. He persuaded Alan Jensen to join New Avon Body Co, a Standard Motor associate and under Wilde's aegis Alan Jensen designed the first Standard Avon open two-seaters produced from 1929 to 1933. He went on to design two more cars for Avon then moved with his brother Richard to Austin dealers Edgbaston Garage Limited, Bournbrook, in a building still standing next to the University of Birmingham campus. Edgbaston Garage, a car servicing business, had been bought for his son in 1929 by J A M Patrick's father. Young Joe Patrick, involved in all fields of motor sport, was setting up a coachbuilding operation. For his Edgbaston Garage the Jensen brothers made handsome bodies for the new Wolseley Hornet and Hornet Special chassis. To the concern of the brothers their cars were widely advertised as The Patrick Special and so in 1931 the brothers moved again. Edgbaston Garage became Patrick Motors Limited.

The Jensen brothers had gone to work for lorry body maker W J Smith & Sons in Carters Green in West Bromwich again to build bodies for small sports cars including more Wolseley Hornet Specials. This was a quite separate development which Smith named on their account Jensen Motors. Their own name was on the product. In 1934 Smith died and the brothers managed to buy a controlling shareholding in Smith & Sons. They later changed the name of W J Smith & Sons to Jensen Motors Limited.

Smith's announced an open 4-seater and a lowered 2-seater in May 1931 both to be known as Jensen Wolseley Hornets. They later expanded to build exclusive customised bodies for standard cars produced by several manufacturers of the day including Morris, Singer, Standard, as well as Wolseley. In 1934 they were commissioned by American film actor Clark Gable to design and build a car for him based on a Ford V-8 chassis. The resultant car won them much acclaim and stimulated huge interest in their work, including a deal with Ford to produce a run of Jensen-Fords with Jensen bodywork with a Ford chassis and engine. In 1934 they also started to design their first true production car under the name White Lady. This evolved into the Jensen S-type which went into production in 1935.

== Commercial vehicles ==
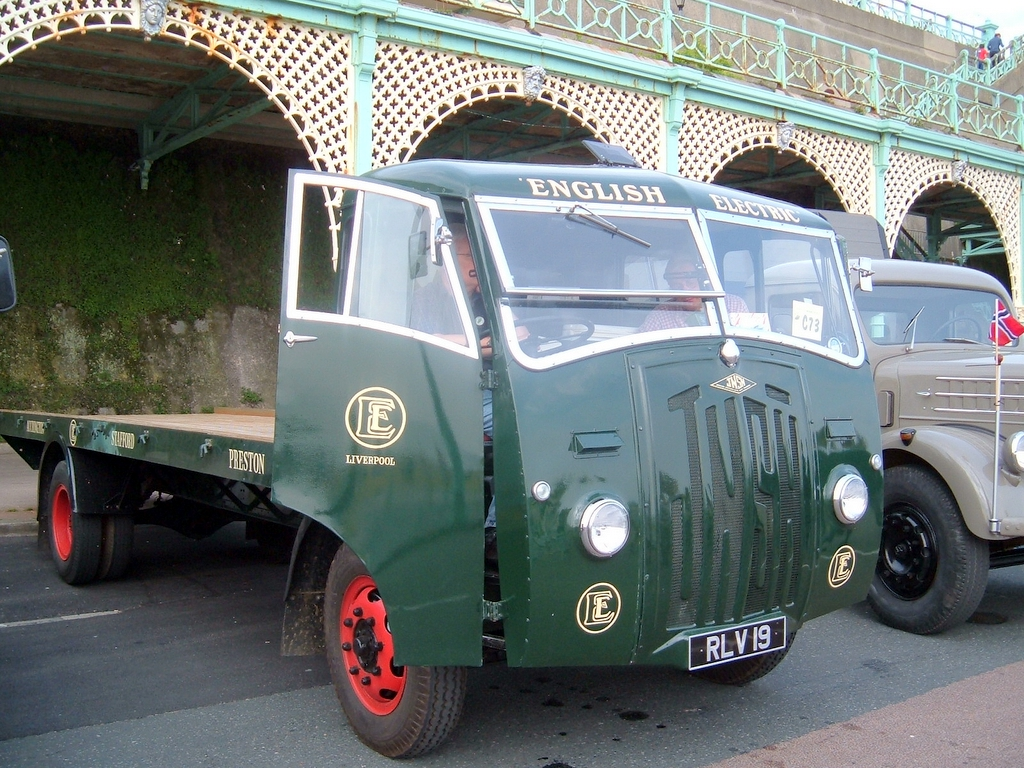
JNSN lorry

In the late 1930s, Jensen diversified into the production of commercial vehicles under the marque JNSN, including the manufacture of a series of innovative lightweight trucks, built with unrestricted aluminium alloys, for Reynolds Tube and the prototype for the articulated Jen-Tug which went into production in the late 1940s.

During the Second World War Jensen concentrated on the war effort and produced components for military vehicles including the turrets for tanks, and on the production of specialised ambulances and fire-engines.

After the war production of the Jen-Tug thrived and Jensen also produced a new range of JNSN lightweight diesel trucks and chassis which were used for a variety of vehicles including pantechnicons and buses. A handful of Jensen buses and coaches were produced for independent operators into the 1950s, with Perkins diesel engines, David Brown gearboxes, and bodywork by a variety of bodybuilders of the time, which had the distinctive large JNSN marque cut into the sheet metal on the front of the bus, below the windscreen. In the 1950s Jensen were chosen by the British Motor Corporation (BMC) to build the bodies for the four-wheel-drive Austin Gipsy. In 1958 they built a small number of Jensen Tempo light commercial vans, pick-ups and minibuses, a German original design, built under licence in the UK, Chassis number 5 that was the 1958 commercial motor-show vehicle, fitted with a Ruthmann cherry picker, is the only known survivor and is currently being restored.

== Sports cars ==
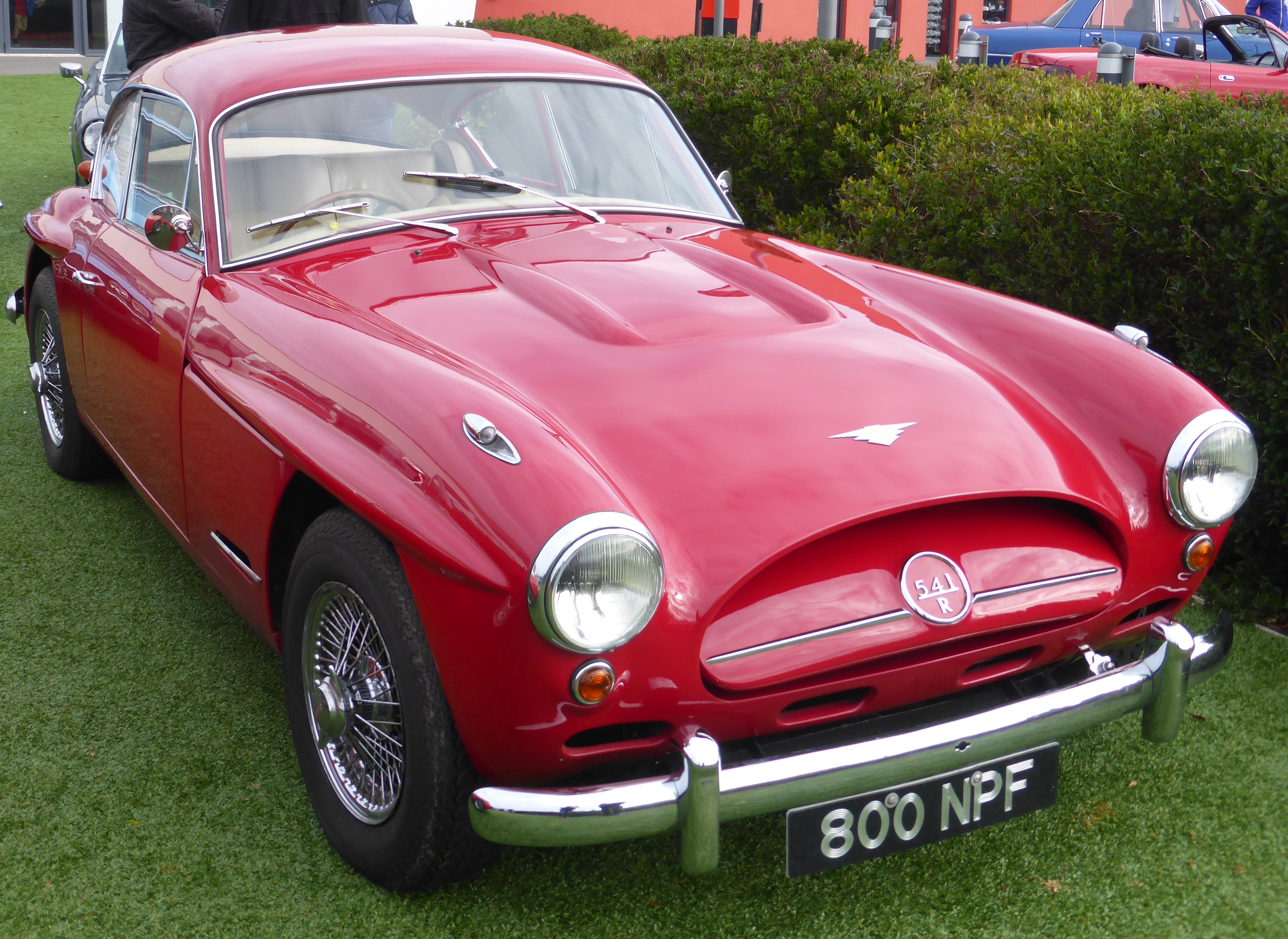
1960 Jensen 541R

Production of cars ceased during the war years, but by 1946 a new vehicle was offered, the Jensen PW (a luxury saloon). Few were produced since raw materials were carefully limited by the new government's central planning. Also in 1946 body designer Eric Neale joined Jensen Motors from Wolseley and his first project was the more modern coupé which followed in 1950, named the Interceptor, which was built until 1957.

In 1955, Jensen started production of Neale's masterpiece, the 541, which used the then-revolutionary material of fibreglass for its bodywork. The radiator grille was covered by an unusual driver-controlled swivelling flap.

The 541S was replaced by another Neale design, the C-V8 in October 1962, which replaced the Austin-sourced straight-6 of the previous cars with a 6-litre American Chrysler V8. This large engine in such a lightweight car made the Jensen one of the fastest four-seaters of the time.

For its eventual replacement, the Interceptor, Jensen turned to the Italian coachbuilder, Carrozzeria Touring, for the body design, and to steel for the material. First displayed alongside the production C-V8 FF in October 1965 and put into production in the second half of 1966 the bodyshells themselves were built by Vignale of Italy and later by Jensen. The same 383 cu in (6.3 L) Chrysler wedge-head powerplant was used in the earlier cars with the later cars moving to the 440 cu in (7.2 L) in engine. The Interceptor was offered in fastback, convertible and (rare) coupé versions. The fastback was by far the most popular with its large, curving wrap-around rear window that was hinged for access to the storage area, making the Jensen an early form of liftback.

=== FF — All wheel drive and ABS ===
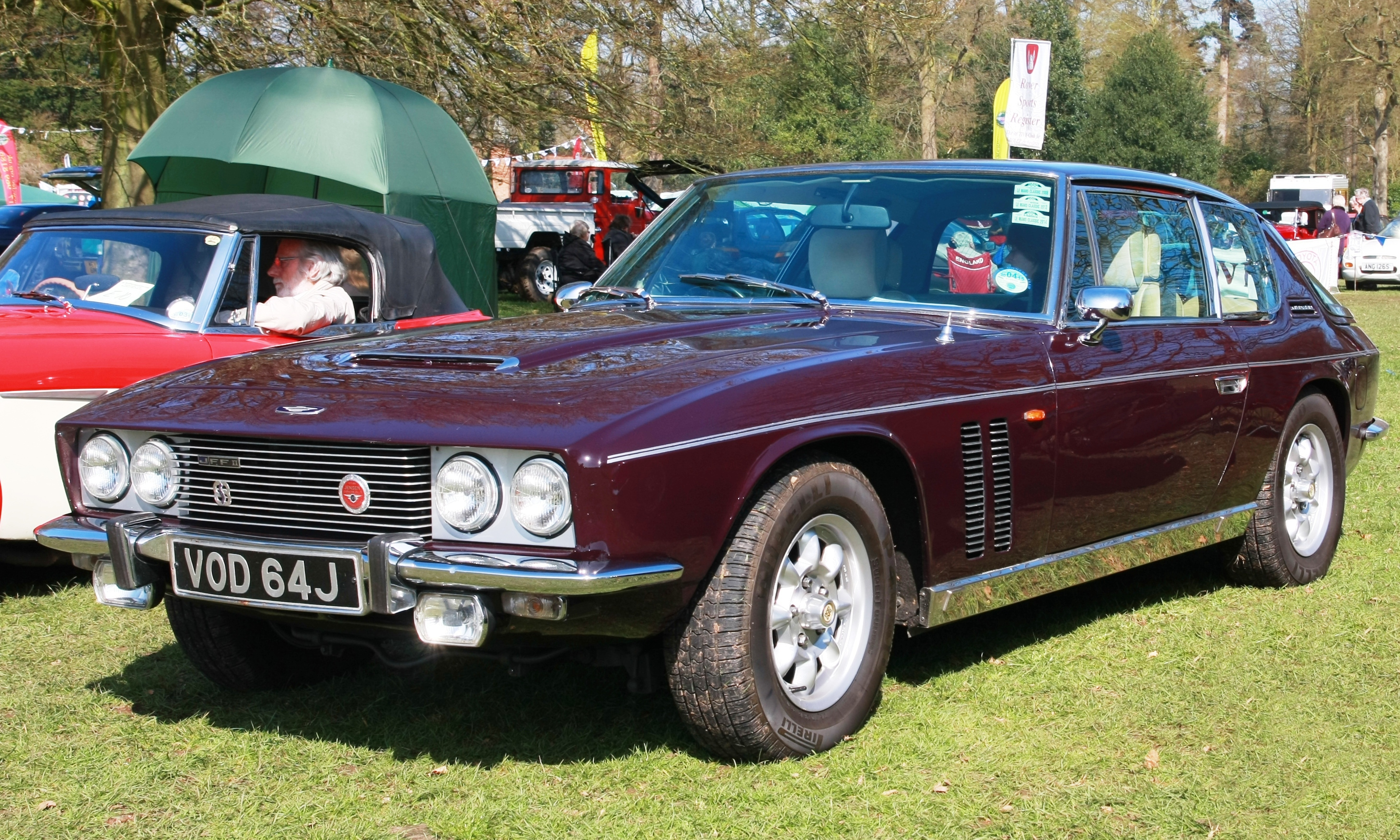
Jensen FF Mk.II

The Jensen Motors stand at the October 1964 Earls Court Motorshow displayed a Jensen FF car equipped with all wheel drive and ABS as publicised but not displayed in February 1964. At the following Show in October 1965 a production ready CV-8 FF was displayed, priced almost 50 per cent more than the standard car and three inches longer. However, it remained a prototype and instead the Interceptor-based Jensen FF entered production in 1966. The FF is apparently externally identical to the Interceptor, although it was four inches longer in the bonnet (all ahead of the windscreen) and it had a second row of air vents behind the front wheels.

The extra letters stood for Ferguson Formula, Ferguson Research being the inventor of the full-time all wheel drive system adopted, the first on a production sports car. Also featured was the Dunlop Maxaret anti-lock braking system in one of the first uses of ABS in a production car.

Just 320 FFs were constructed and production ceased in 1971.

== Other projects ==
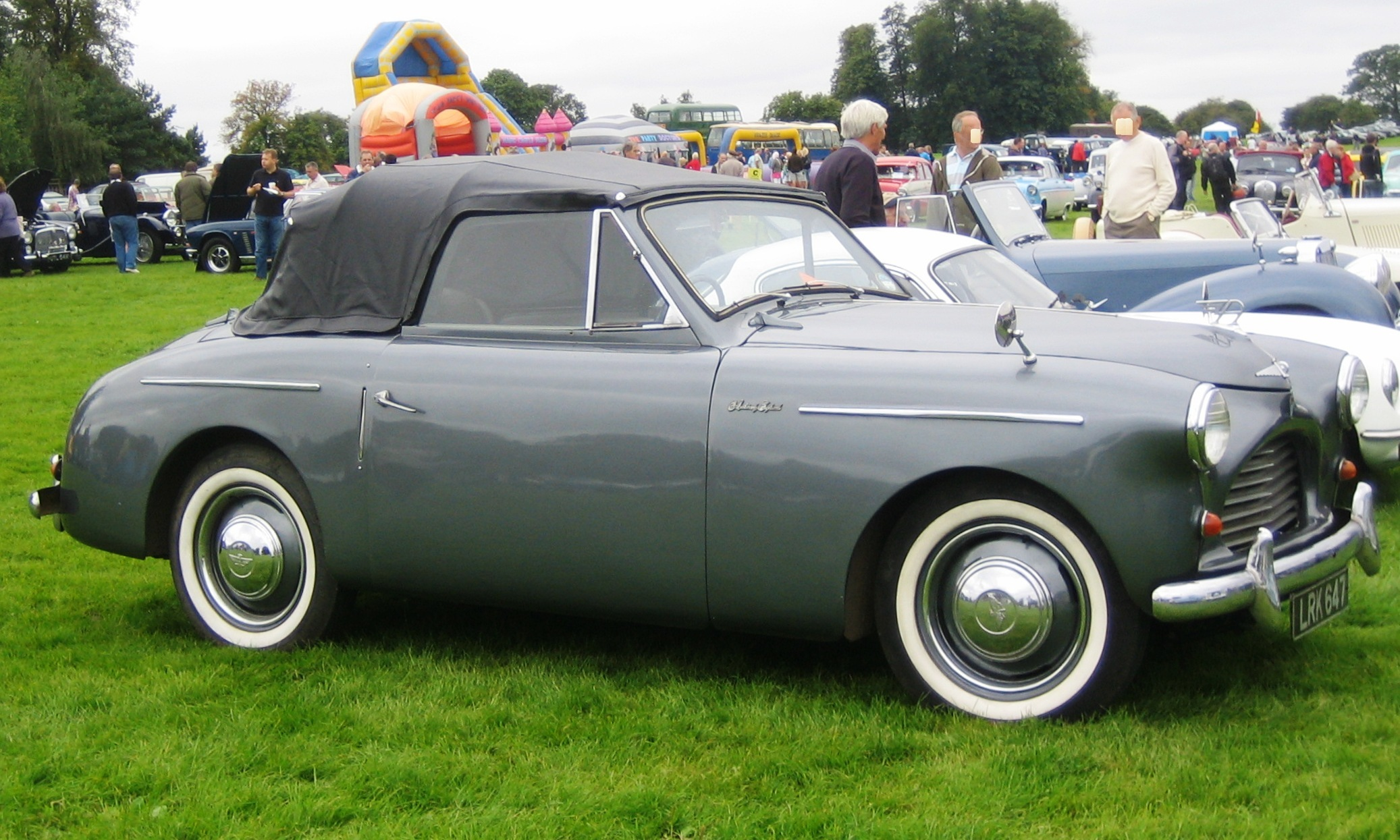
Austin A40 Sports, ca 1951

Austin A40 Sports: As one in a series of collaborations between Austin and Jensen, the Austin A40 Sports originated when Austin's chairman Leonard Lord, upon seeing the Interceptor, requested that Jensen, and their designer Eric Neale, develop a body that could use the A40 mechanicals.

The resulting body-on-frame A40 Sports – which debuted at the 1949 London Motor Show – had been designed by Eric Neale, an ex-Wolseley stylist who had joined Jensen in 1946. During production, the A40 Sports' aluminium bodies were built by Jensen and transported to Austin's Longbridge plant for final assembly. The A40 Sports had been intended as more of a sporty touring car and not a sports car per se, and over 4000 examples were manufactured from 1951 to 1953.

Austin-Healey 100: Although Jensen's design for a new Austin-based sports-car was rejected by the British Motor Corporation (BMC) in 1952 in favour of a design provided by Donald Healey, Jensen did win the BMC contract to build the bodies for the resultant Austin-Healey 100 and the rest of the "big Healey" cars. At the end of 1960 Austin-Healey cars occupied about 350 of the 850 men in Jensen's factory.

Volvo P1800: In 1960 Jensen won a contract from Volvo to assemble and finish the bodies for their P1800 coupé. Pressed Steel manufactured the body-shells at their Linwood plant in Scotland and shipped them to Jensen in West Bromwich to be finished, painted and trimmed and made ready for distribution. The first batch for evaluation came off the production line in May 1961. The engine and gearbox were from Sweden, the back axle from USA and the electrical system from Germany, otherwise the car was all British. By March 1962 1,100 men were busy in Jensen's West Bromwich works making Austin-Healey bodies and Volvo and Jensen cars. By 1963 the contract was ended early due to quality concerns and P1800 production was moved to Gothenburg, Sweden.

Sunbeam Tiger: In the early 1960s Jensen was also involved in the development and production of the Sunbeam Tiger.

== Jensen-Healey ==
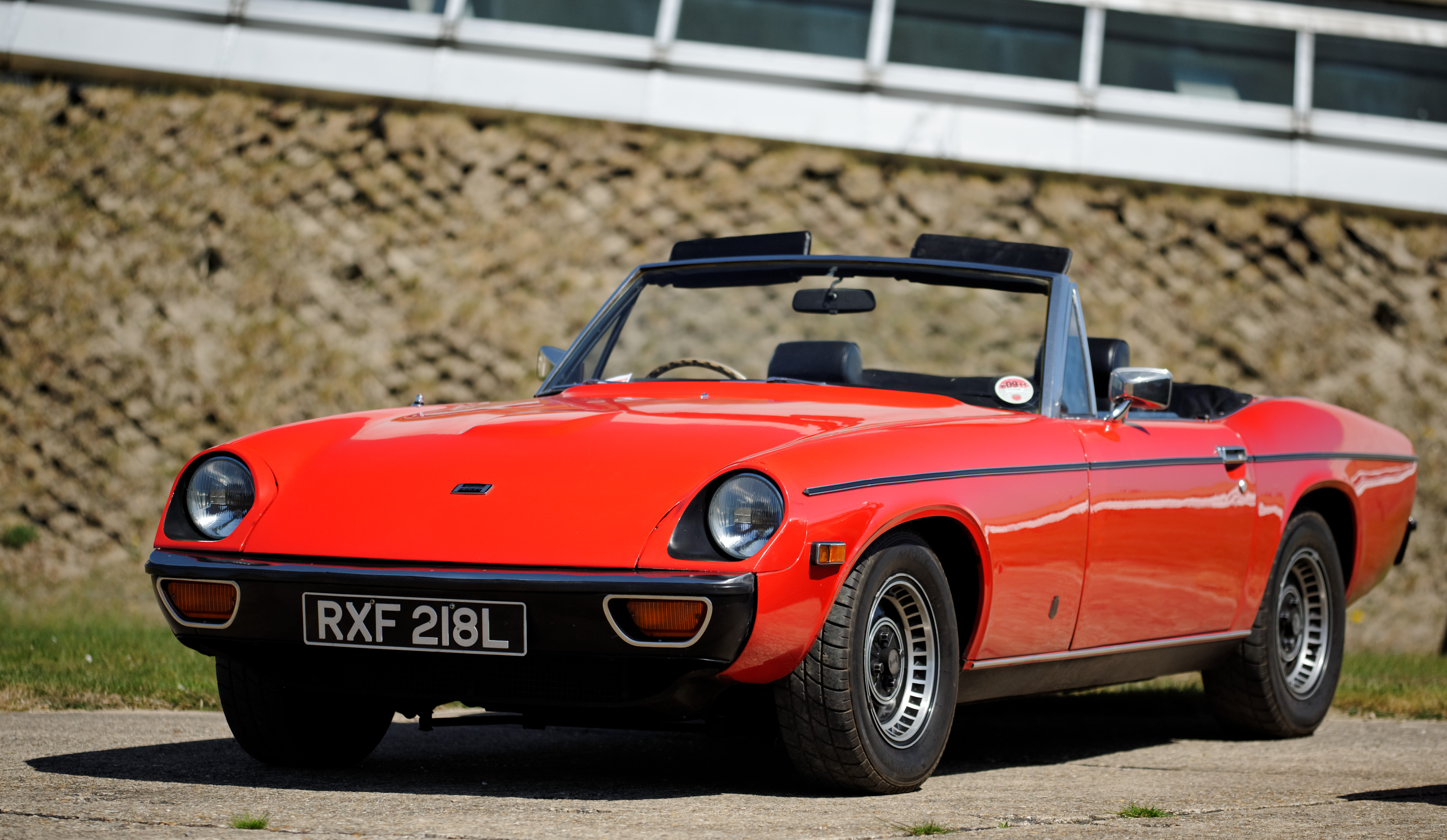
1972 Jensen-Healey

Jensen was bought by Norcros Limited, "an industrial holding company" in June 1959. Alan Jensen retired from the positions of joint managing director and alternate chairman in October 1964 though he remained on the board. Richard Jensen "relinquished" his appointment as joint managing director in November 1965 but remained chairman. Following disagreements Alan and Richard Jensen resigned from the board in 1966. Richard retired to Malta and died back in London in September 1977. Alan died in Brighton in 1994.

In September 1967 Jensen announced they had been hit by the US car safety regulations which were going to come into force the following January. They expected there would have to be many redundancies resulting from the drop in demand for the Austin-Healey 3000 and Sunbeam Tiger though both had been modified to meet the regulations. At the end of the year they advised their shareholders that Austin-Healey and Sunbeam Tiger contracts had now ended. An American management consultant, Carl Duerr, replaced the chief executive. It was decided that from now on Jensen Motors would be a full-time car manufacturer. In mid 1968 following a disastrous 1967 year Norcros decided to sell their automotive subsidiary whose products "cost about the same as small houses". Current production rate was 12 Interceptors and FFs a week. In 1968 it was bought by a merchant bank William Brandts.

The Norwegian-American West Coast car distributor Kjell Qvale became the majority shareholder in 1970 and brought in Donald Healey who was appointed chairman in April 1970 and they brought in a new chief executive in May. They were able to announce the new Jensen-Healey in March 1972. By the end of May the next year 3,356 of the new cars had been manufactured but the factory's performance disappointed the owner and sales volume was mediocre.

In October 1974 Kjell Qvale appointed himself chief executive as well as chairman. Production was cut back from 25 to 12 a week to match sales. A Jensen GT was announced in July 1975, a Jensen-Healey with a coupé/estate body then the business's future came under threat which meant redundancy for 700 workers – two thirds of its workforce.

== Receivership ==
A receiver was appointed by the Bank of America in September. Kjell Qvale laid great emphasis on the part played by the unions in bringing about the downfall of the business. The financial pundits said that in his attempt to mass-produce a small sports car Qvale installed production capacity far in excess of market demand. The empty premises were auctioned off in mid-August 1976.

Two new companies: Jensen Special Products (JSP) and Jensen Parts & Service Limited (JP&S) were created to pick up the pieces of Jensen Motors. JSP was created as a specialist engineering and design business from Jensen's development department. JP&S was created to provide parts and service to the existing Jensen customer base. JP&S then turned into a company called International Motors, who gained the UK franchise for Subaru and Maserati, as well as Hyundai from 1982. Both JSP and JP&S were bought by a holding company, Britcar Holdings. In 1982 JP&S, with the rights to use the Jensen brand names, was sold to Ian Orford who put the Interceptor back into production as the Mk IV.

Jensen Parts and Service was renamed Jensen Cars Limited and an average 11 cars were made every month during the 1980s always in small numbers before the company was sold to Unicorn Holdings of Stockport and a Mk V Interceptor was proposed but never materialised although a few more Mk IVs were built.

== Attempts at revival ==
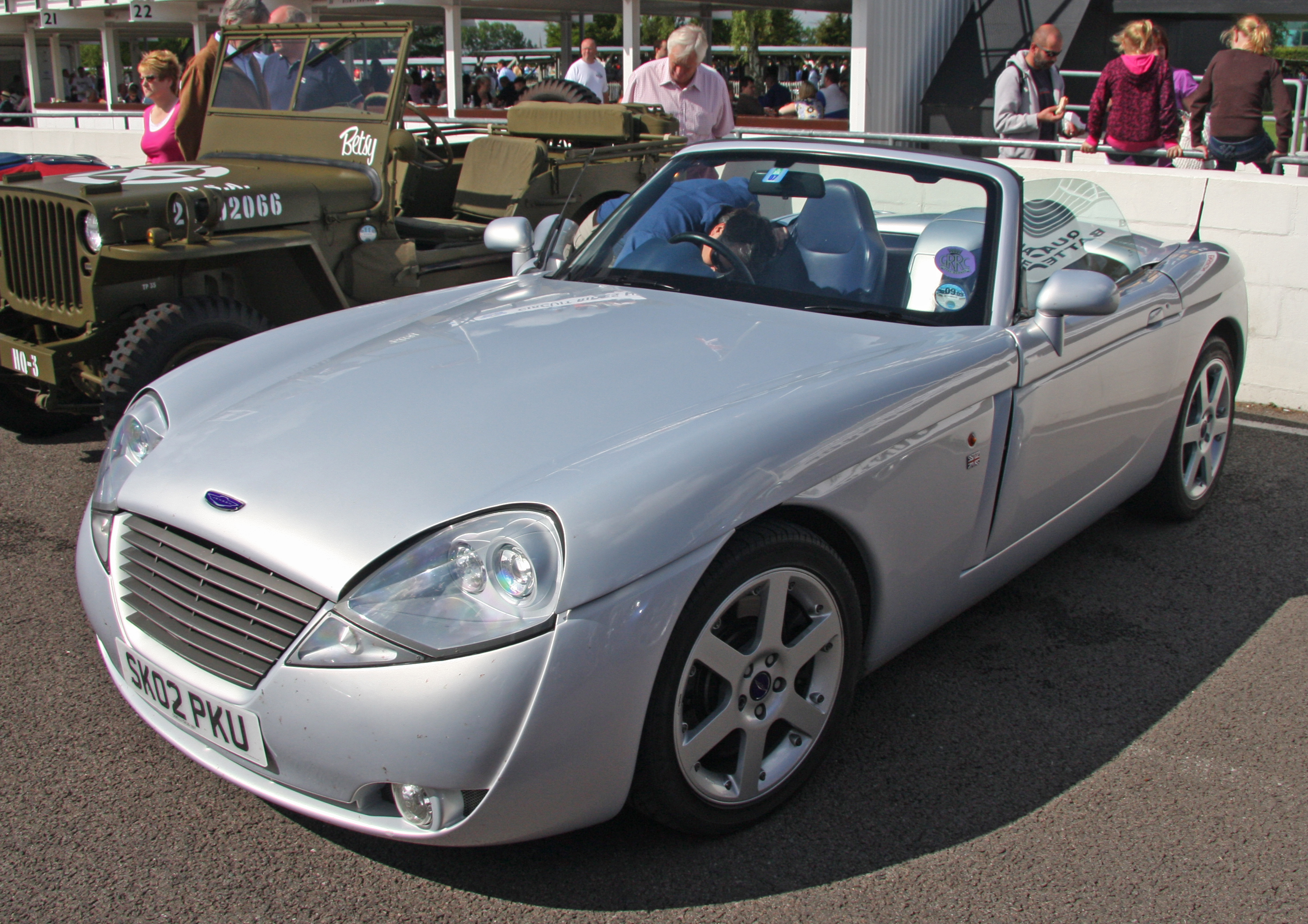
Jensen S-V8

=== 2001 revival ===
A revival in 2001 was short lived. By the end of 2002, production of their only model, the £40,000 S-V8 – had ceased.

After a £10 million investment, including contributions from Liverpool City Council and the Department of Trade and Industry, a two-seater convertible, the Jensen S-V8, was launched at the 1998 British International Motor Show. An initial production run of 300 deposit-paid vehicles was planned at a price of £40,000 each, but by October 1999 it was confirmed that only 110 orders had been placed.

The new Liverpool factory in Speke commenced production in August 2001, but troubles with manufacture meant production ceased with only 20 leaving the factory and another 18 cars left partially completed. The company went into administration in July 2002. The Jensen name and partially completed cars were later sold to SV Automotive of Carterton, Oxfordshire, in 2003 who decided to complete the building of 12 of the cars, retaining the others for spare parts, and finally selling them for £38,070.

=== Jensen International Automotive ===
In April 2010 Jensen International Automotive (JIA) was founded. This new company will buy old Jensen Interceptors, and sell them as new cars after a complete restoration, with new engine and interior trim.

In September 2011 CPP, a specialist sports car manufacturer announced they were planning to make a new Jensen, expected to go on sale to the public sometime in 2014. The new Interceptor was to be based around an all-aluminium chassis and to feature alloy panels, "echoing the four-seat grand tourer layout of the much-loved original", according to the official press release.

=== The Jensen Group ===
On the 25 February 2015, Autocar published a report stating that the Jensen name was officially being revived with two models expected by 2016. The first model, shown in clay on the same article, showed a vehicle called the Jensen GT. This model was to be built in bespoke numbers and cost around £350,000 outside the UK. Also in 2016, Jensen was expected to launch the successor to the famous Jensen Interceptor, called the Interceptor 2. These revival announcements were completely different from those announced by CPP in 2011 and were "officially sanctioned" by the company leading the project, "The Jensen Group", who claimed they have established complete ownership over the Jensen marque. The interim Jensen GT was to be produced under an agreement between the Jensen Group and Jensen International Automotive.

=== 2026 ===
In early 2026, Jensen International Automotive announced plans to launch an "all-new, ultra high performance British GT", inspired by the Interceptor later that year. The new Jensen will reportedly be built in very low numbers in the UK, powered by a V8 engine and built upon an aluminium chassis, designed to compete with companies such as Aston Martin.

== Jensen cars ==
- Jensen S-type (1936–1941)
- Jensen H-type (1938–1945)
- Jensen PW (1946–1952)
- Jensen Interceptor (1950–1957)
- Jensen 541 (1954–1959)
- Jensen 541R (1957–1960)
- Jensen 541S (1960–1963)
- Jensen C-V8 (1962–1966)
- Jensen P66 (1965 prototype only)
- Jensen Interceptor (1966–1976)
- Jensen FF (1966–1971)
- Jensen SP (1971–1973)
- Jensen-Healey (1972–1975)
- Jensen GT (1975–1976)
- Jensen S-V8 (2001–2002)

== See also ==
- Austin-Healey 100
- Austin-Healey 3000
- Volvo P1800
- Sunbeam Tiger
- List of car manufacturers of the United Kingdom
