= Jensen PW =

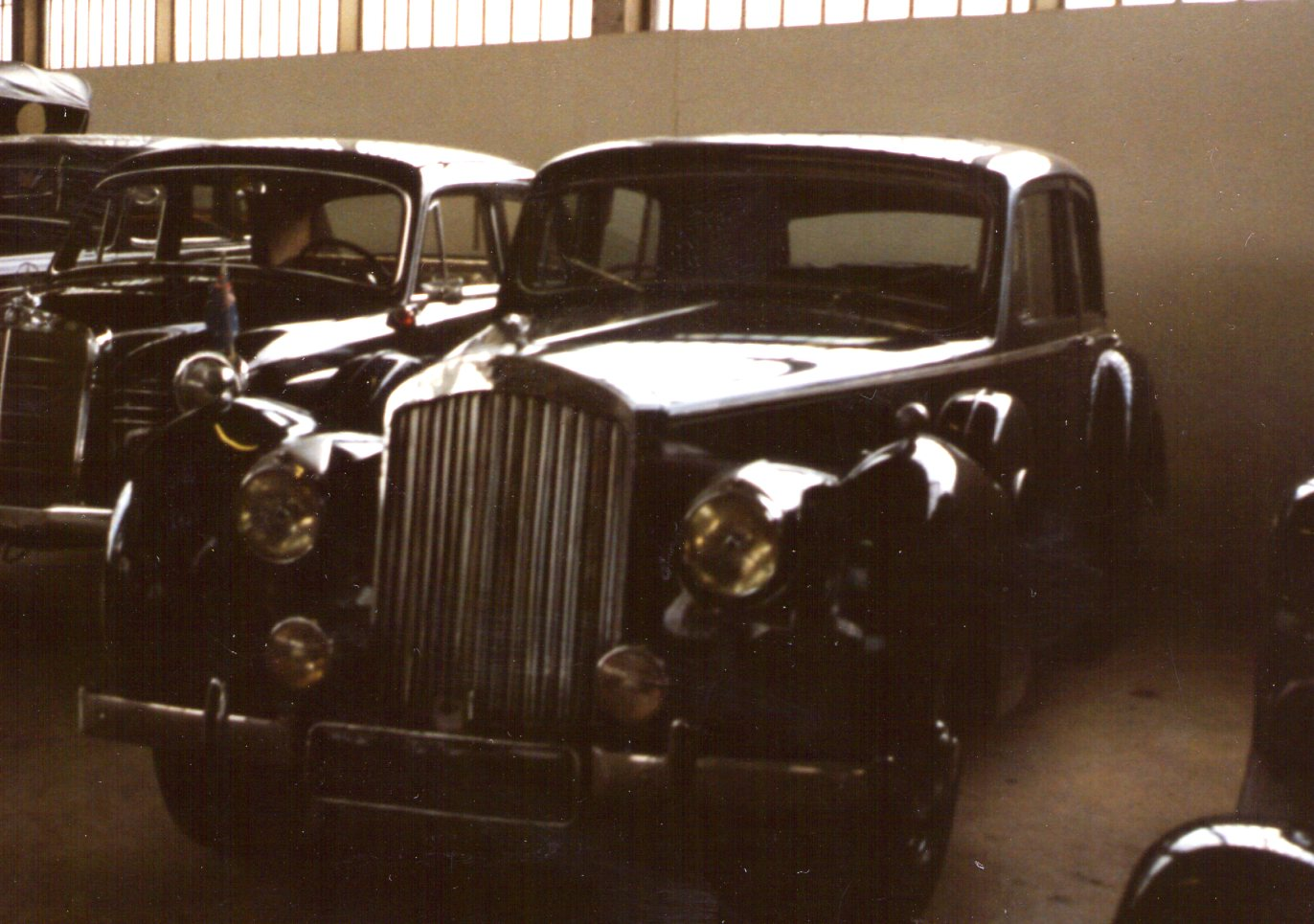

Overview
- Manufacturer: Jensen Motors
- Production: 1946–1952

Body and chassis
- Body style: Saloon
- Layout: Front-engine, rear-wheel-drive

Powertrain
- Engine: 3.9 L Austin I6; 4.0 L Meadows I8

Chronology
- Predecessor: Jensen H-type
- Successor: Jensen Interceptor

The Jensen PW is a saloon car built by Jensen Motors from 1946 through 1952. The PW stood for Post-War, as the car was the first model built by Jensen after the Second World War. A convertible model was also built alongside the hardtop saloon.

The first models utilized the Meadows 3,993 cc (4.0 L; 243.7 cu in) straight-eight engines. However, issues arising from harsh vibrations while driving eventually led to Jensen engineers to switch first to Nash straight-eights and then to better established 3,993 cc (4.0 L; 243.7 cu in) straight-six engines from the Austin Sheerline.

In total, fewer than twenty examples of the PW left Jensen's West Bromwich factory.

== See also ==
- Jensen Motors
- List of British cars
