= Jensen S-type =

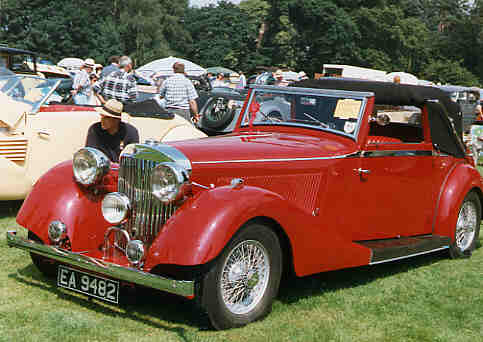
- 1938 Jensen S-type Drophead, 3.5-litre

Overview
- Manufacturer: Jensen Motors
- Production: 1936–1941

Body and chassis
- Body style: Saloon; Convertible
- Layout: Front-engine, rear-wheel-drive

Powertrain
- Engine: 2.3 L Ford flathead V8 engine; 3.5 L Ford flathead V8 engine

Chronology
- Successor: Jensen H-type

The Jensen S-type is a car built by Jensen Motors from 1936 until 1941 as both a saloon and a convertible. It was the firm's first volume production car, based on Ford V8 engines from the United States, and chassis parts from Ford of Britain sourced through M B K Motors. The car was built on a steel chassis and used aluminium for the body panels. The car was sold with either a 2,227 cc (2.2 L; 135.9 cu in) or a 3,622 cc (3.6 L; 221.0 cu in) Ford flathead V8 engine, equipped with two downdraft carburetors, Vertex ignition, and a Columbia overdrive rear axle. The cars were available in three body styles: 2-door convertible, 3-door tourer, and 4-door saloon.

In total, there were about fifty S-type cars built by Jensen in their West Bromwich factory, with an estimated ten cars still surviving today.
