= Jensen H-type =

Overview
- Manufacturer: Jensen Motors
- Production: 1938–1945

Body and chassis
- Body style: Saloon
- Layout: Front-engine, rear-wheel-drive

Powertrain
- Engine: 4.3 L I8

Chronology
- Predecessor: Jensen S-type
- Successor: Jensen PW

The Jensen H-type is a saloon car built by Jensen Motors from 1938 until 1945. The car was built on a strengthened Ford chassis and used aluminum for the body panels. The car was sold with a 4,279 cc (4.3 L; 261.1 cu in) OHV straight-eight engine built by Nash. However, there was at least 1 H-type that was fitted with a V12 from the Lincoln Zephyr.

As the car was produced during wartime, the output from the factory in West Bromwich had slowed as raw materials were required in abundance to help the war effort. In total, fifteen complete examples of the H-type left Jensen's factory.

== See also ==
- List of British cars
