= Jensen S-V8 =

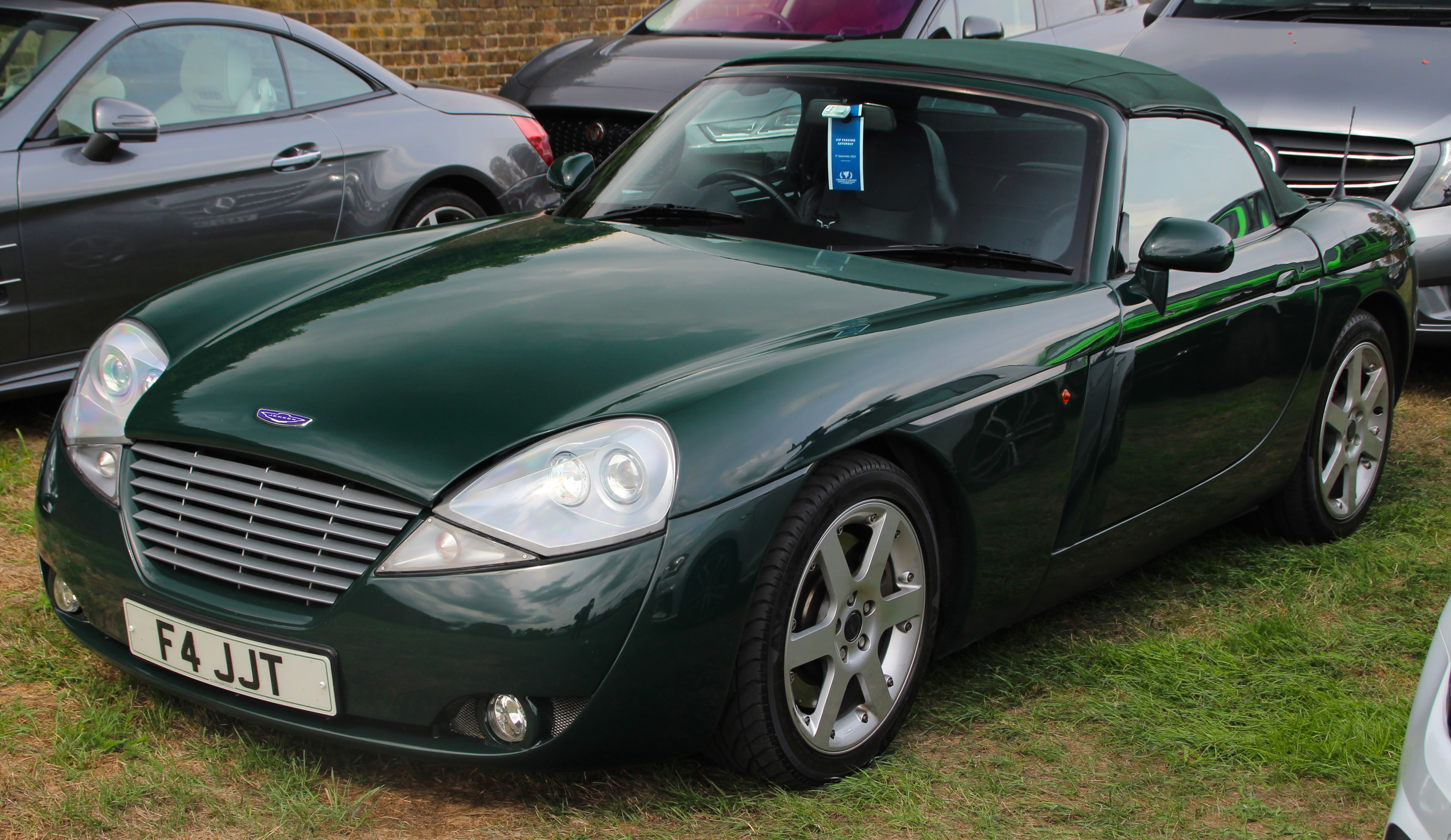

Overview
- Manufacturer: Jensen Motors
- Production: 2001-2002
- Assembly: Speke, England
- Designer: Howard Guy and Gary Doy

Body and chassis
- Body style: Two-door convertible
- Layout: Longitudinal Front-engine, rear-wheel-drive

Powertrain
- Engine: 4.6 L Ford Modular DOHC V8
- Transmission: 5 speed manual

The Jensen S-V8 is a roadster built by the British automaker Jensen Motors, and the most recent production car to carry the name Jensen.

== History ==
After a £10 million investment, including Liverpool City Council and the Department of Trade and Industry, the two-seater convertible was launched at the 1998 British International Motor Show, with an initial production run of 300 deposit paid vehicles planned at a selling price of £40,000 each, but by October 1999 it was confirmed that 110 orders had been placed.

The new Merseyside factory in Speke commenced production in August 2001 but troubles with manufacture meant production ceased with only 20 ever leaving the factory and another 18 cars left partially completed. The company went into administration in July 2002.

The Jensen name and partially completed cars were later sold to SV Automotive of Carterton, Oxfordshire, in 2003. SV Automotive was to complete the build of 12 of the cars and sell them for £38,070, retaining the others for spares.

== Specifications ==
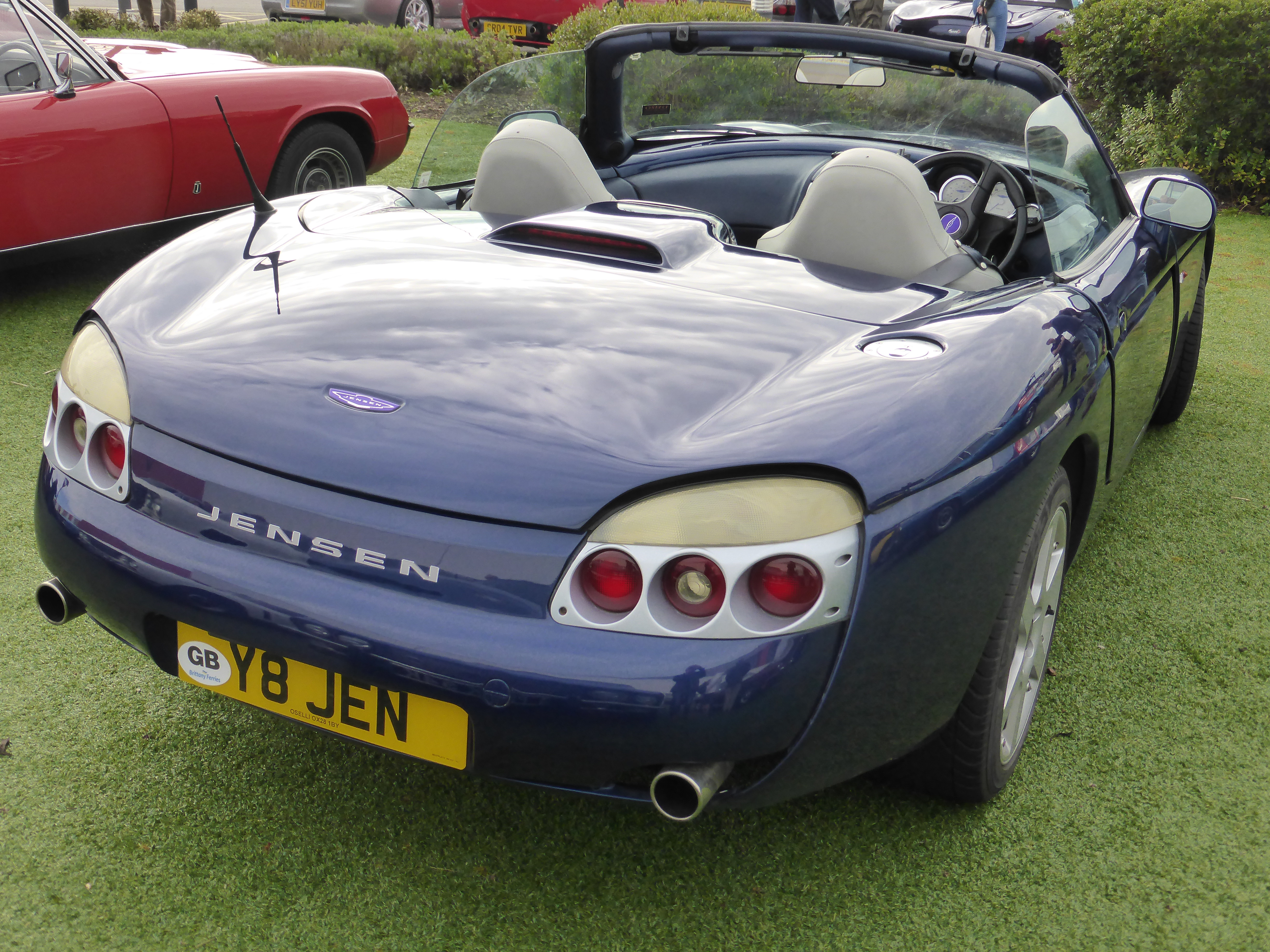
Rear view

The S-V8 is powered by a Ford Mustang-sourced 4.6-litre (4601 cc), 32-valve, four-cam, V8 engine producing 325 bhp (242 kW; 330 PS), giving it a top speed of 160 mph (260 km/h) and a 0-60 mph (97 km/h) time of less than five seconds.

== C-V8 ==
A coupé version of the convertible S-V8 was planned, but due to the company's troubles, it never saw the light of day, except for one prototype.
