= Austin Sheerline =

British automobile

Austin A110 Sheerline Austin A125 Sheerline
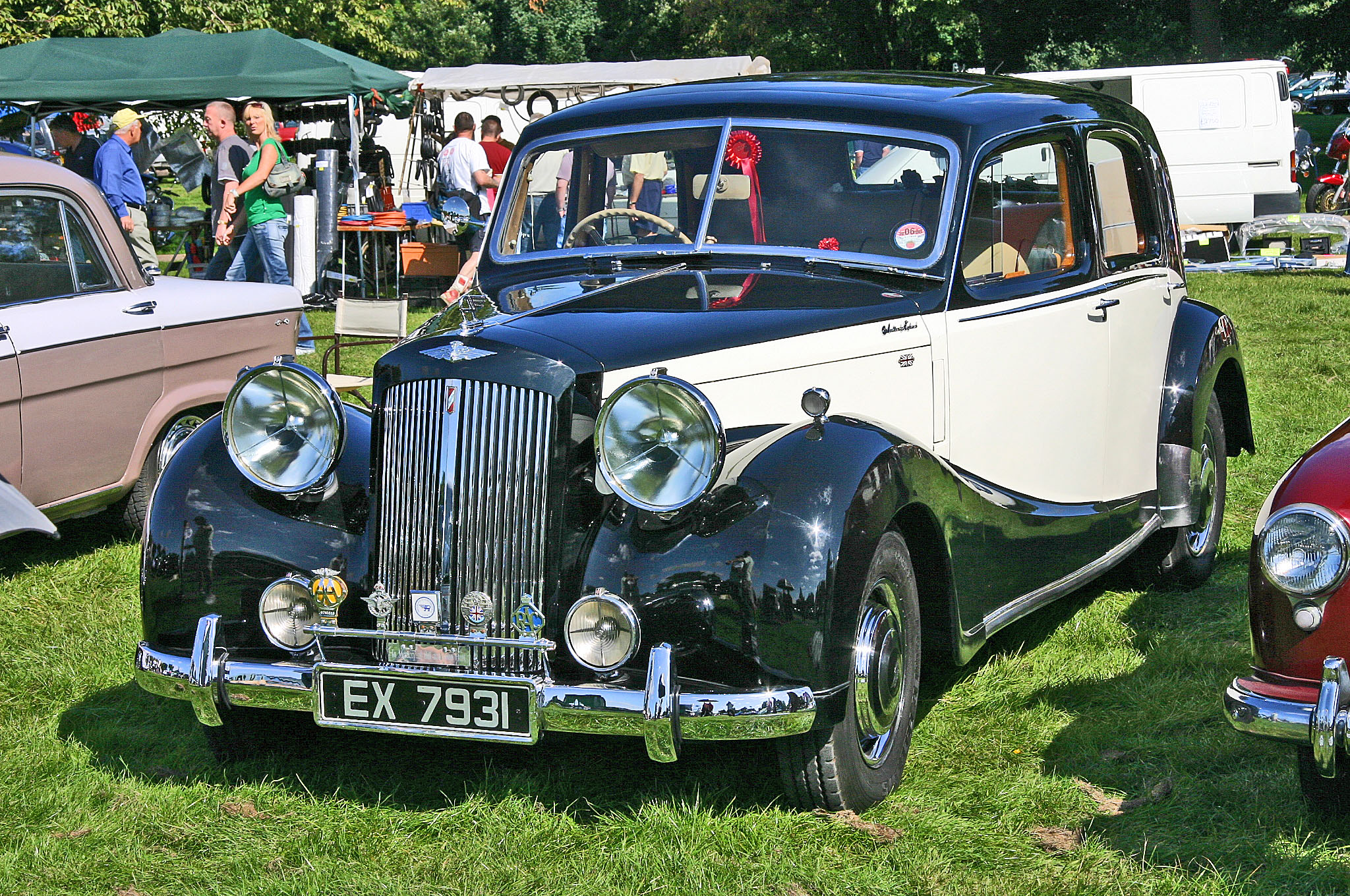
- Austin A125 Sheerline (DS1)

Overview
- Manufacturer: Austin
- Production: 1947–1954
- Designer: Ricardo Burzi

Body and chassis
- Body style: 4-door saloon 4-door limousine (lwb); Ambulance (lwb); Hearse (lwb)
- Related: Austin Princess

Powertrain
- Engine: A110: 3,460 cc (211.1 cu in) D-Series OHV I6; A125: 3,995 cc (243.8 cu in) D-Series OHV I6

Dimensions
- Wheelbase: 3,028.9 mm (119.25 in); 3,352.8 mm (132 in) (lwb)
- Length: 4,864.1 mm (191.5 in)
- Width: 1,854.2 mm (73 in)
- Height: 1,701.8 mm (67 in)
- Kerb weight: 1,880–2,032 kg (4,145–4,480 lb)

Chronology
- Predecessor: Austin 28 Ranelagh
- Successor: Austin A135 Princess; Vanden Plas Princess

The Austin Sheerline is a large luxury car produced by Austin in the United Kingdom from 1947 until 1954.

== History ==
The new Sheerline, with razor-edge styling, first appeared at the Geneva Motor Show on 13 March 1947.

The Sheerline was a luxurious car in the style of the contemporary Rolls-Royce or Bentley but at a much lower price, around two-thirds that of the equivalent Rolls-Royce but still the price of five or six small Austins.

Design began in 1942 during WW2 when Austin Motors Chairman, Sir Leonard Lord, decided that Austin needed a large and traditionally styled car to compete in the luxury car market.

Argentine/Italian stylist, Ricardo Burzi designed the Austin Sheerline based on Leonard Lord's sketches. The day Italy entered the war, Ricardo Burzi was interned on the Isle of Man due to being an 'Italian resident alien' and only released after Leonard Lord pulled some strings and personally vouched for his character. Upon release he was allowed to work on condition that he worked in an isolated area and reported daily to the police. He designed the Austin Sheerline alongside the Austin A40 in a 30 ft long office and about half as wide with a full sized layout board and three desks. Initially a Plasticine model was created with a full size wooden "Mock-up" model completed by 1946.

The Austin Sheerline was the first Austins to have a 'Flying A' bonnet mascot and 'Austin of England' script. Austin Chairman, Sir Leonard Lord, owned a Bentley during the war and the story goes that he took the Bentley 'Flying B' bonnet mascot from his personal Bentley and gave it to Austin designer Ricardo Burzi to create something similar. In one day, Burzi altered the slope of the 'B' and formed a stylized 'A' attaching a skeletal wing to the trailing edge and wrapped it in foil. This mascot became Austin's logo and featured on all models until the 1960s.

== Production ==
Volume production did not begin until 1947 because of Austin Motors commitment to war production.

In 1949 a limousine model was produced on a stretched 11 ft chassis, Twelve and a half inches had been added to the wheelbase as well as a sliding glass partition behind the driver an foldaway occasional seating.

Both models were built at Austin's Longbridge plant from 1947 to 1954.

There were about 8,000 built along with 475 long wheelbase limousines and 300 chassis available to coacbuilders for ambulances, shooting brake estate and hearses.

Austin Sheerline Model Data
Vehicle Type	Chassis Code/Numbers	Dates	Number Produced
A110/125 Sheerline SWB Saloon	DS1 (1-10504)	1947–1954	approx 8000 (12 as A110 Sheerlines)
A125 Sheerline LWB Limousine	DM1 (3020-10165)	1949–1953	approx 475
A125 Sheerline Ambulance	DA1 (3195-12812)	1950–1955	approx 300 Ambulance/Hearse combined
A125 Sheerline Hearse	DH1 (3100-12458)	1950–1955	Ratio of 4 hearses to each ambulance

Production ceased in 1954 and Austin's luxury offering was limited to the A135 Austin Princess.

== Engine ==
The Austin Sheerline 4-Litre OHV straight-six engine was based on the famous Austin D-Series engine, with slight differences.

The first new British cars to be introduced since the war by one of the large manufacturers have now been announced. They are the Austin Sheerline 110 and Princess 120 saloons, the former with knife-edge coachwork made at Longbridge Birmingham and the latter having a more streamlined body which is the work of Vanden Plas, the coach building firm acquired by Austins last year. The chassis of both cars is similar, the only difference being in the number of carburettors. The figures after the names of the models indicate the brake horse-power. The cars are new from end to end, and the specifications include a new three and a half litre six-cylinder, overhead valve engine, steering column control of the four-speed synchromesh gearbox, independent front suspension using coil springs, and hydraulic brakes. The prices are £1,278 for the 110 and £1,917 for the 120, including purchase tax. designated A110, had a 3,460 cc straight-six overhead valve engine but this was soon increased to 3,995 cc with 125 bhp (93 kW) and the designation then became A125. Only twelve examples of the A110 Sheerline were produced. At 37 hundredweight (1,850 kg) for the saloon and 2 tons (2,000 kg) for the limousine the A135 was a heavy car, and to maintain performance a low final drive ratio of 4.55:1 with 16-inch tyres was fitted. The saloon version had a top speed of 82 mph (132 km/h).

Anders Clausager, an archivist at BL Heritage Ltd, discovered that no more than 12 Sheerlines and 32 Princesses, mainly prototype and pre-production cars, were fitted with the 3,460cc engine before the increase to 3,993cc at the end of 1947.

The Austin Sheerline engine was shared with the Austin Princess and also used in the Jensen PW and Jensen 541

== Chassis ==
Austin produced two chassis for the Austin Sheerline and the Austin Princess.

Initially only a saloon version on a 9-foot-11¼-inch (3 metre) wheelbase chassis was made, but this was joined by a limousine version in late 1949 on a stretched 11 ft (3.3 metre) chassis available for use by coachbuilders for conversion to an ambulance, shooting brake estate or hearse.

A pressed-steel cross-braced chassis frame was used, and for the first time on an Austin, independent front suspension. Other features were a hydraulic jacking system, Lockheed hydraulic brakes and a steering-column gearshift. Suspension was by coil springs at the front and semi-elliptic leaf springs at the rear.

The Austin Sheerline had Smith's "Red Jackall" hydraulic jacking system installed on its chassis behind each wheel. This was operated by a hydraulic pump that allowed all four wheels to be lifted at once to easily change a tyre. A valve knob accessed through a trap door under the carpet under the driver's seat operated this system. this

The consensus is that in the Last of the Summer Wine episode The Loxley Lozenge, the chassis of an Austin Sheerline was used as a prop for the titular (fictional) vehicle.

== Coachbuilt examples ==
The Austin Sheerline and Princess could also be supplied as either a rolling chassis or chassis cab for the fitting of bespoke coachwork.

Approximately 300 chassis cabs were produced for coachbuilders to produce hearses, ambulances and shooting brakes.

A unique 4-door convertible was built on a 1949 Austin Sheerline rolling chassis by Belgian Coachbuilders Vesters & Neirinck in Brussels. Originally ordered by Desire Gillet of the motorcycle manufacturer 'Gillet-Herstal', it resembles the work of the French coachbuilder Saoutchik.

In 1950 Queen Juliana of the Netherlands ordered Dutch coachbuilders Pennock to construct a six-cylinder convertible limousine for the Dutch Royal Household. A 1950 Austin Sheerline Limousine DM1 (left hand drive) rolling chassis was delivered to Pennock and the unique Double Convertible Town Car was delivered to the Royal Household in 1952.

Austin Motors and their London distributors, Car Mart Ltd, gifted a 1947 Austin Sheerline to HRH Queen Elizabeth II and Prince Philip on their wedding day. This particular car had some interesting features being fitted with Vanden Plas' sportier triple carburettor's as opposed to the standard single Stromberg unit, rear compartment shelves that held 'His and Hers' glass fragrance bottles, etc.

== Gallery ==
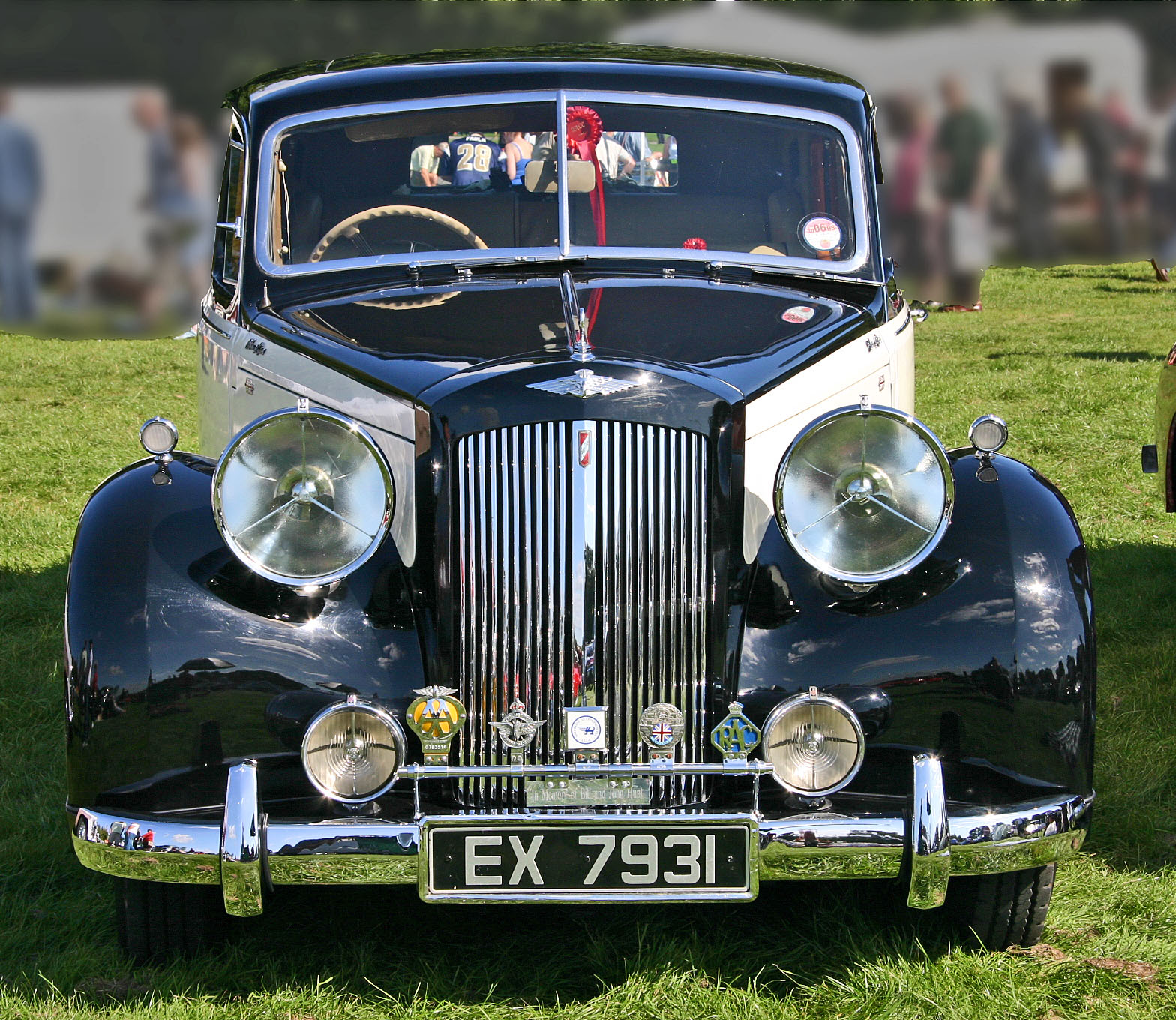
Austin A125 Sheerline (DS1)

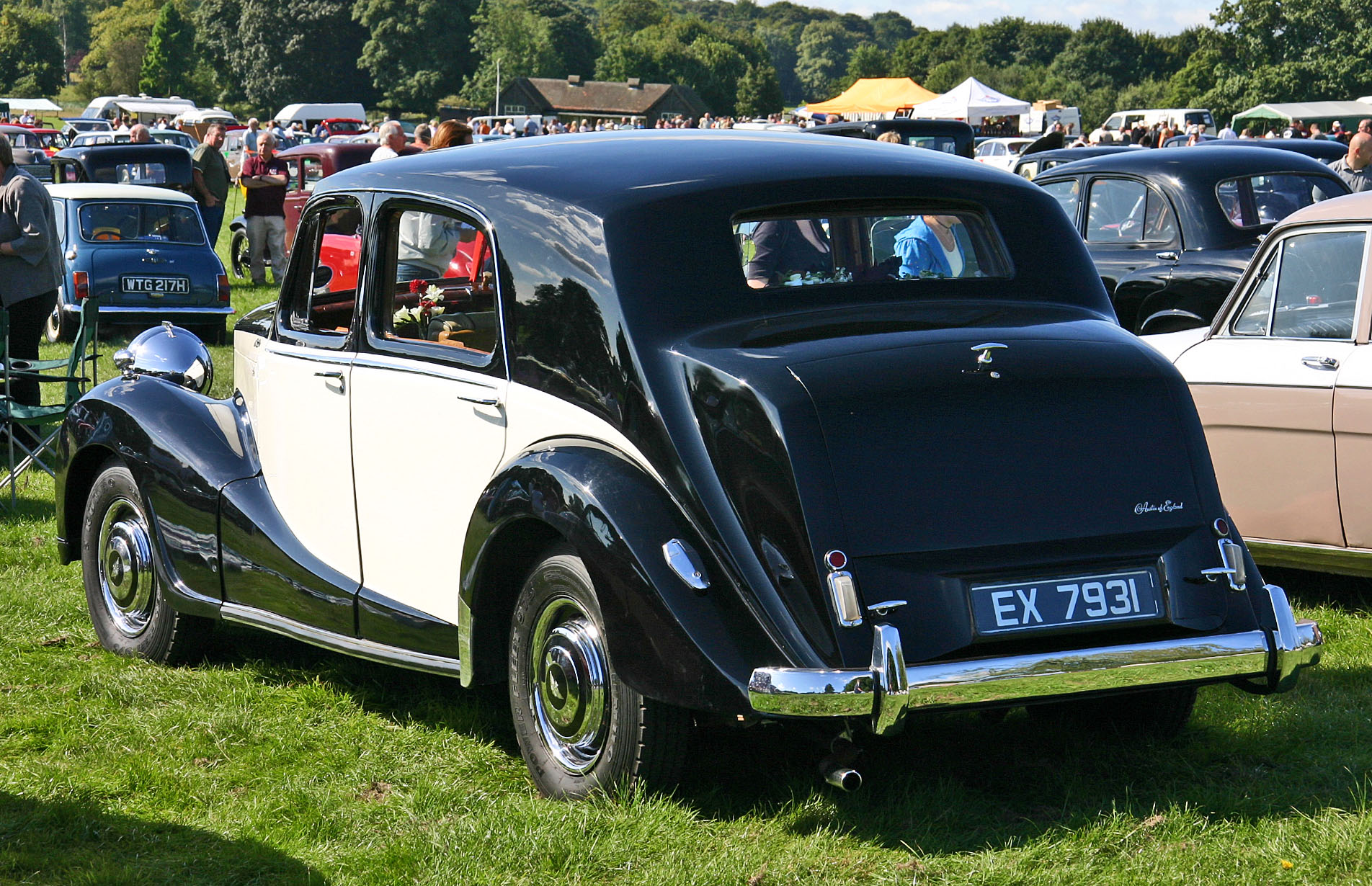
Austin A125 Sheerline (DS1)

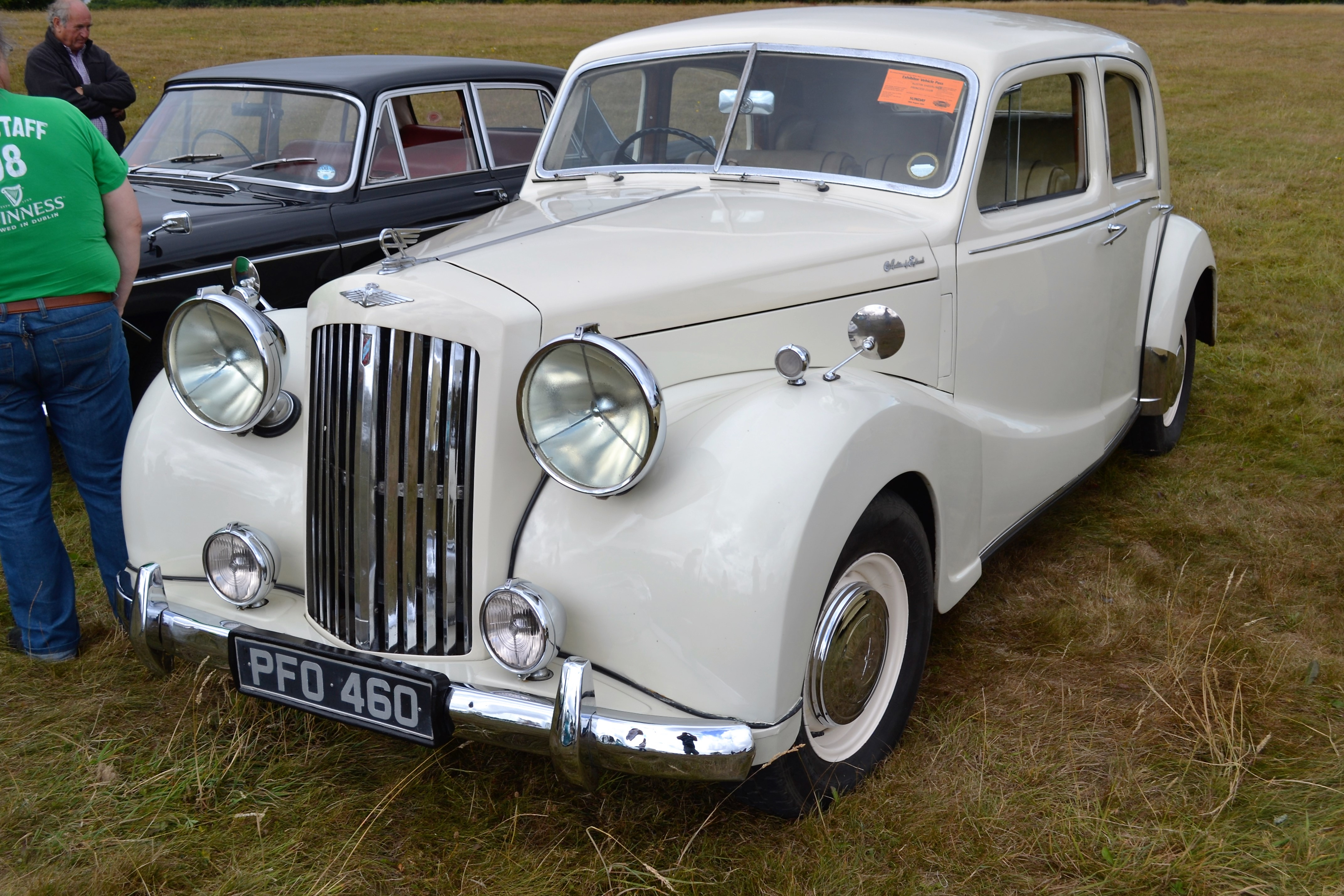
1949 Austin A125 Sheerline (DS1)

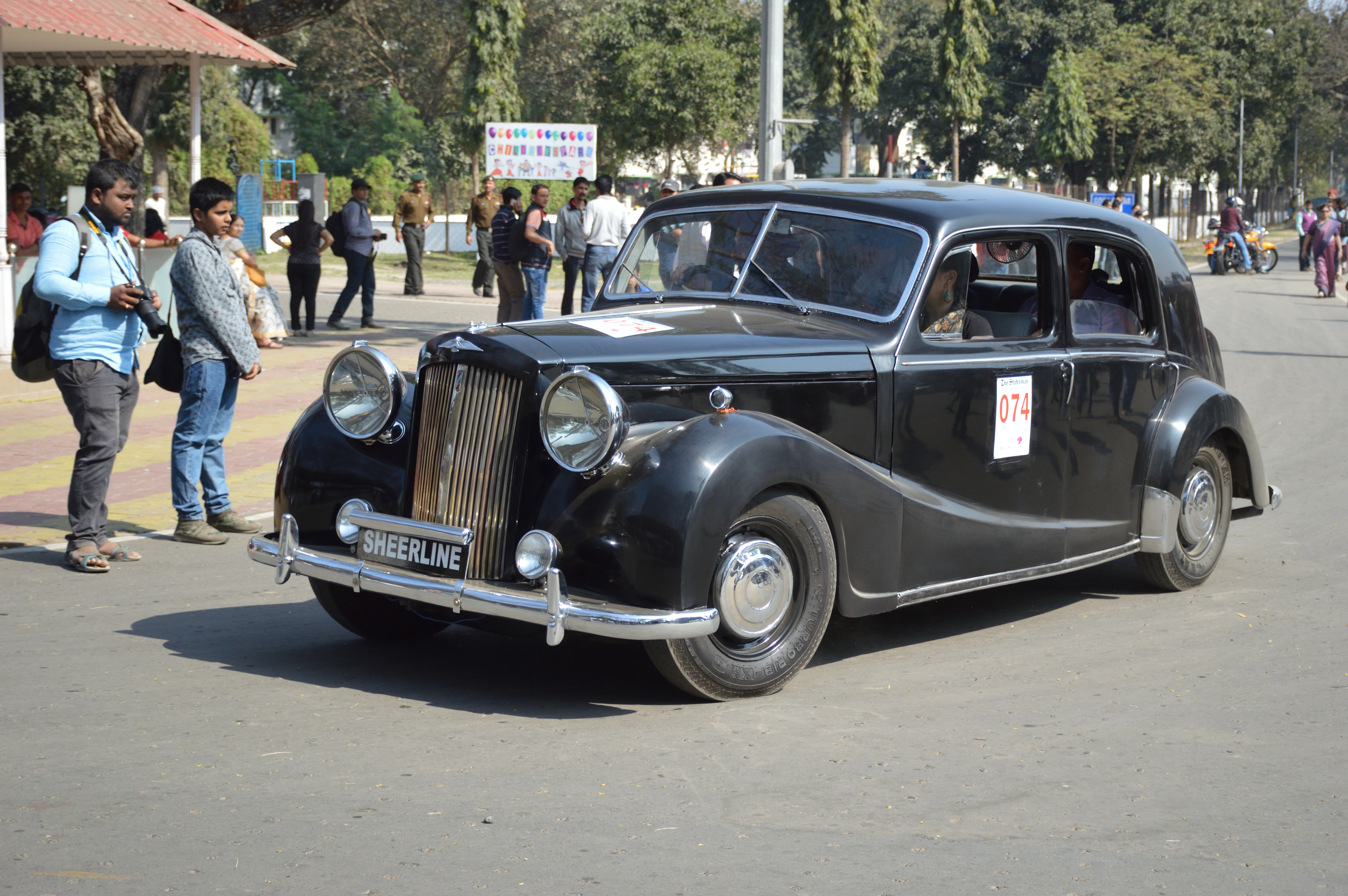
Austin A125 Sheerline (DS1)

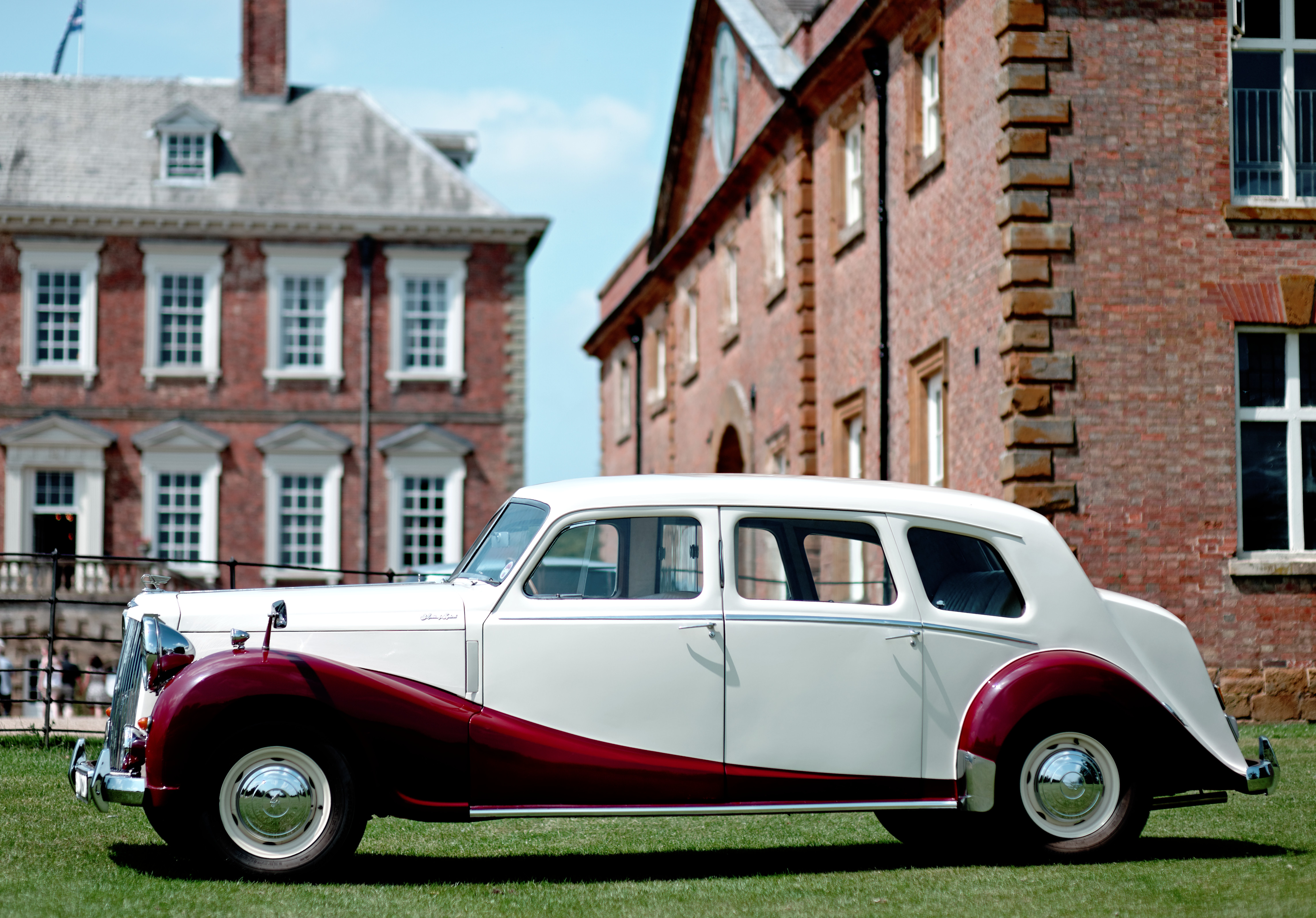
Austin A125 Sheerline Long wheelbase limousine (DM1)
