= Eric Neale =

British car designer (1910-1997)

Eric William Neale (26 September 1910 – 1997) was a British car designer.

== Biography ==
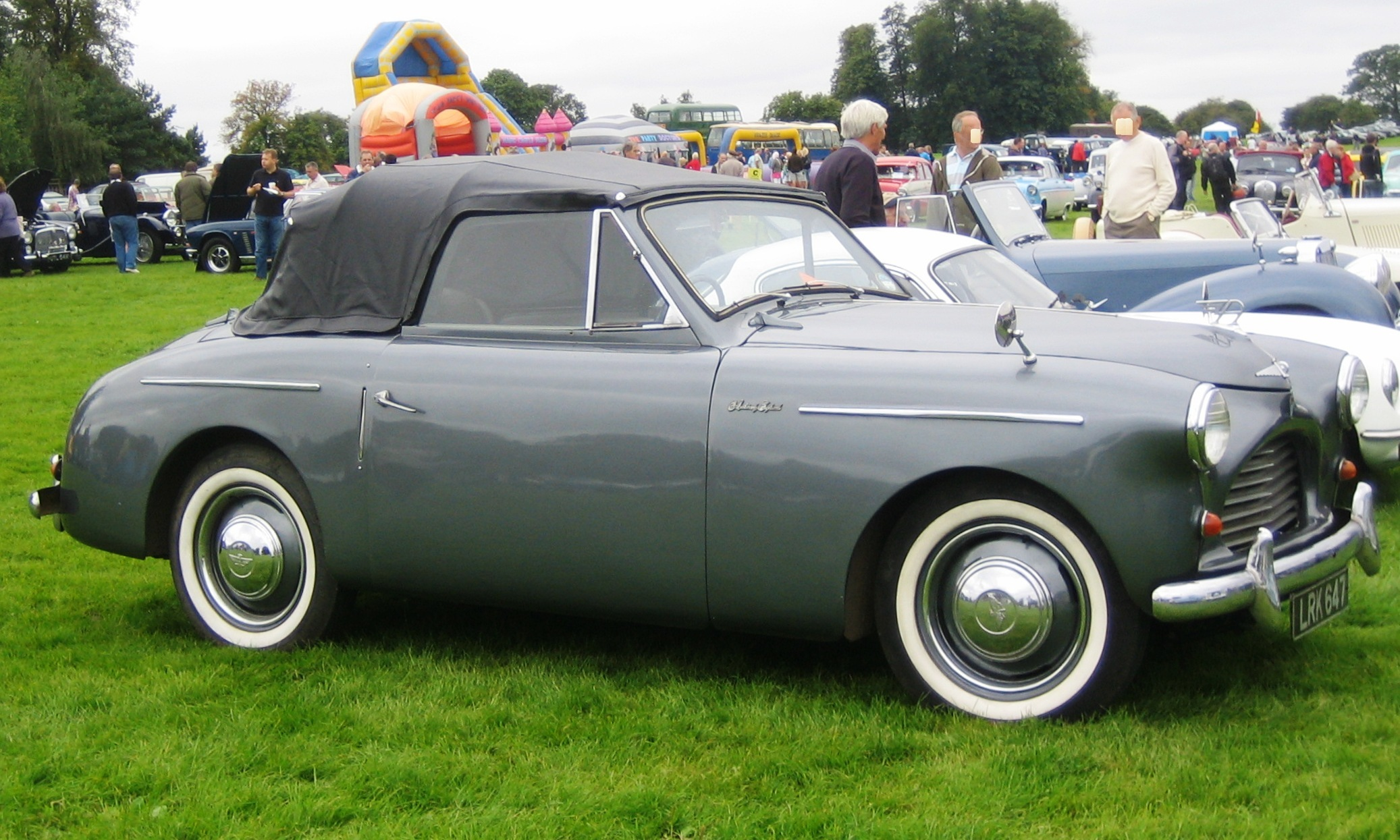
Austin A40 Sports, circa 1951, manufactured by Austin in conjunction with Jensen Motors – and styled by Eric Neale. Despite its name, the A40 Sports was intended as a sporty touring car rather than a true sports car

Born in Halesowen, Worcestershire and educated at Halesowen Grammar School. He served as an apprentice designer at Mulliners in Birmingham.

In 1929 he left Mulliners to join Samuel Holbrook Limited in Coventry who made bodies for Alvis, Triumph and Armstrong Siddeley. After only two years he moved on to join Singer in Birmingham as a body designer, and later to Daimler where he worked on Lanchester and Daimler saloons.

In the late 1930s Neale moved to Austin and then to Wolseley.

During World War II Neale served in the Royal Air Force. After the war Neale went back to Wolseley and then in 1946 moved to Jensen.

Neale resigned from Jensen in 1966 following Jensen's decision to drop his P66 design in favour of the Touring design for the new Jensen Interceptor although he played an important role in amending the Italian Interceptor design so as to improve its appearance and make it suitable for production. His reputation as a stylist was somewhat negatively affected for many years by the headlamp design for the C-V8, however he was too loyal to his former employer to reveal that the teardrop-shaped headlamp covers of his original design had been removed prior to production by Richard Jensen, thereby leading to the controversial appearance of the production cars. Neale died in 1997.

== Some of his cars ==
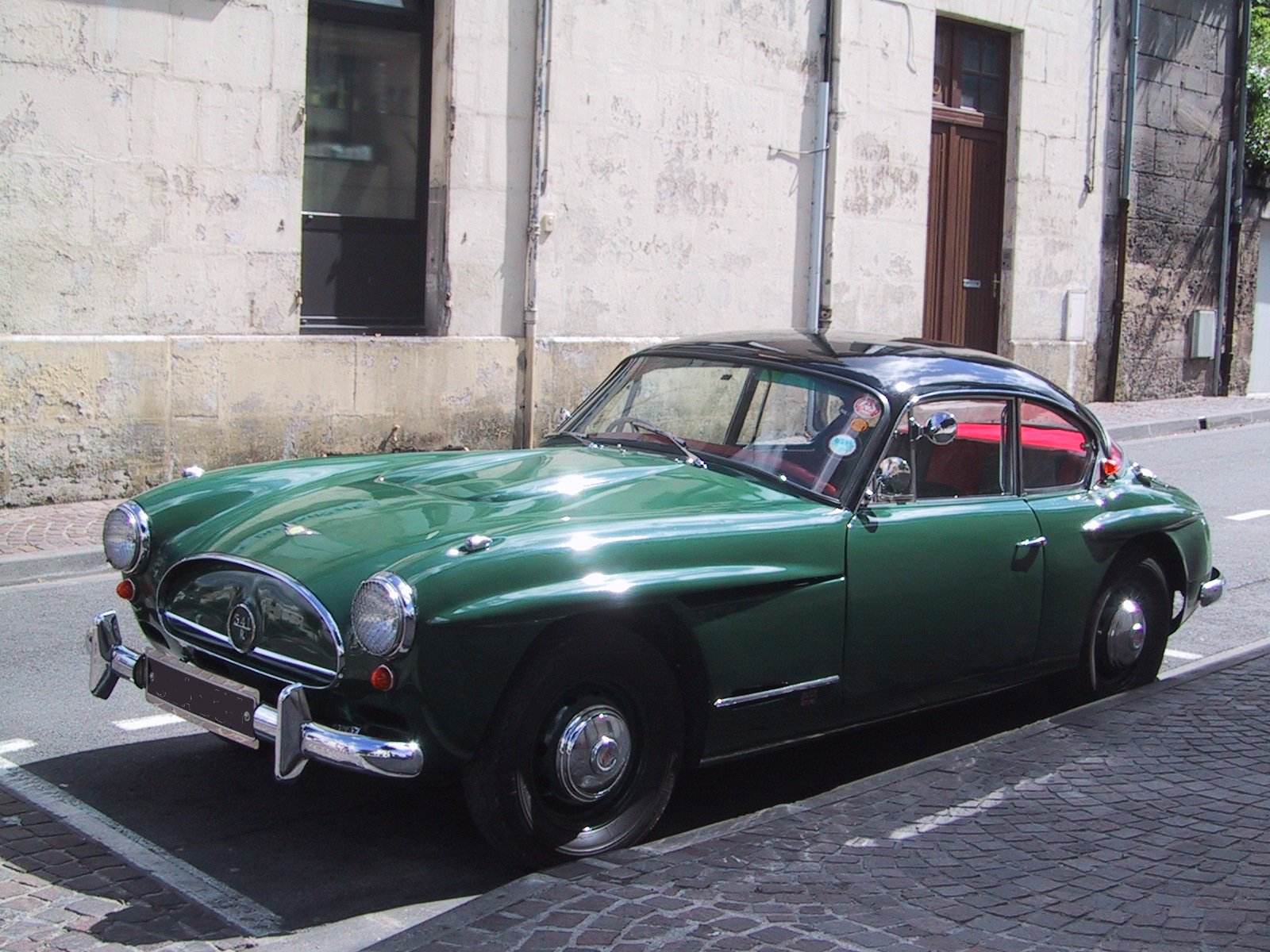
Jensen 541R

- Singer Nine
- Austin A40 Sports (1951–1953)
- Jensen Interceptor (1950)
- Jensen 541
- Jensen C-V8 1962–1966
- Jensen P66
- Jensen Interceptor (1966–1976) co-stylist
