= P66 (disambiguation) =

P66, or Papyrus 66, is a biblical manuscript of the Gospel of John.

P66 may also refer to:

- BMW P66, an automobile engine
- HMS Varne (P66), a submarine
- Jensen P66, a sports car
- Percival P.66 Pembroke, a transport aircraft
- Vultee P-66 Vanguard, a fighter aircraft
- P66, a state regional road in Latvia
