= Philip Boehm =

American playwright, theater director and literary translator (born 1958)

Philip Boehm (born 1958) is an American playwright, theater director and literary translator. Born in Texas, he was educated at Wesleyan University, Washington University in St. Louis, and the State Academy of Theater in Warsaw, Poland.

Boehm is the founder of Upstream Theater in St. Louis, which has become known for its productions of foreign plays. Fluent in English, German and Polish, he has directed plays in Poland and Slovakia. His own written work includes several plays such as Mixtitlan, Soul of a Clone, The Death of Atahualpa, The Good Ship Saint Louis, and Return of the Bedbug.

Boehm has translated over thirty novels and plays by German and Polish writers, including Herta Müller, Franz Kafka and Hanna Krall. Nonfiction translations include A Woman in Berlin and Words to Outlive Us: Eyewitness Accounts from the Warsaw Ghetto. For these translations he has received fellowships from the National Endowment for the Arts and the John Simon Guggenheim Memorial Foundation, as well as several awards including the Schlegel-Tieck Prize, the Oxford-Weidenfeld Translation Prize, the Helen and Kurt Wolff Translator's Prize, and the Ungar German Translation Award by the American Translators Association (ATA). He is a member of the Texas Institute of Letters.

== Selected translations and adaptations ==
- Anonymous: A Woman in Berlin: Eight Weeks in the Conquered City: A Diary (Schlegel-Tieck Prize, ATA Ungar Award)
- Ingeborg Bachmann: Malina
- Ulrich Alexander Boschwitz: The Passenger; Berlin Shuffle (2025)
- Bertolt Brecht: In the Jungle of Cities (play)
- Georg Büchner: Woyzeck (adaptation) (play)
- Stefan Chwin: Death in Danzig (Soeurette Diehl Fraser Award)
- Ida Fink: Traces: Stories (co-translator: Francine Prose)
- Aleksander Fredro: Sweet Revenge (play)
- Wilhelm Genazino: The Shoe Tester of Frankfurt
- Olivier Garofalo: Don't Wait for the Marlboro Man (play)
- Johann Wolfgang von Goethe: Egmont (narration to accompany Beethoven's incidental music)
- Michal Grynberg, ed.: Words to Outlive Us: Eyewitness Accounts from the Warsaw Ghetto
- Christoph Hein: Settlement
- Christoph Hein: Willenbrock
- Christoph Hein: The Tango Player
- Anna Janko: A Little Annihilation
- Franz Kafka: Letters to Milena
- Arthur Koestler: Darkness at Noon (ATA's Ungar German Translation Award)
- Hanna Krall: Chasing the King of Hearts (Found in Translation Award, PEN Los Angeles Award, Soeurette Diehl Fraser Award)
- Lucía Laragione: Cooking with Elisa (play)
- Héctor Levy-Daniel: Bitter Fruit (play)
- Herta Müller: The Fox Was Ever the Hunter
- Herta Müller: The Hunger Angel (Oxford-Weidenfeld Translation Prize, National Translation Award, ATA Ungar Award)
- Herta Müller: The Appointment (co-translator: Michael Hulse)
- Albert Ostermaier: Infected (play)
- Minka Pradelski: Here Comes Mrs. Kugelman
- Rafik Schami: Damascus Nights
- Peter Schneider: Couplings: A Novel
- Peter Schneider: The German Comedy (co-translator: Leigh Hafrey)
- Tilman Spengler: Spinal Discord: One Man's Wrenching Tale of Woe in Twenty-Four (Vertebral) Segments
- Ilija Trojanow: The Lamentations of Zeno
- Ingmar Villqist: Helver's Night (play)
- Gregor von Rezzori: An Ermine in Czernopol (Helen and Kurt Wolff Translator's Prize, PEN USA Award)
- Christine Wunnicke: The Fox and Dr. Shimamura (Helen and Kurt Wolff Translator's Prize)
