= The Passenger (Boschwitz novel) =

1938 novel by Ulrich Alexander Boschwitz

- Author: Ulrich Alexander Boschwitz
- Translator: Philip Boehm
- Language: German
- Publisher: Henry Holt and Company
- Publication date: 1938 (Germany), 1939 (United States), 1940 (United Kingdom)
- Publication place: Germany
- Pages: 288
- ISBN: 9781250317148

The Passenger is a 1938 novel by Ulrich Alexander Boschwitz published by Henry Holt under the imprint Metropolitan Books. Initially unsuccessful, its 2021 re-release gained critical acclaim for its ability to capture the zeitgeist of Jewish persecution in Nazi Germany.

== Plot ==
The book tells the story of Otto Silbermann, a respected German-Jewish business owner living in Berlin who has to leave his wife and flee his home in the immediate aftermath of the Kristallnacht pogrom of November 1938 as Nazi German soldiers pound on their door in the middle of the night. Silbermann escapes from his home through the back door and travels on several trains within Germany in an attempt to flee the country.

Silbermann's travels bring him to a number of individuals, some of whom are outcasts of the Nazi regime, while others embrace its ideology wholeheartedly. Initially refusing to accept the realities of Jewish persecution in the new Nazi Germany, Silbermann eventually comes to accept the realities of his new life as his attempts to flee are unsuccessful.

== Reception ==
The book, written by Boschwitz in the weeks after Kristallnacht, was released in the United States and the United Kingdom in 1939 and 1940, respectively. Its first German title was Der Reisende. The Passenger was originally published in English in the United States as The Man Who Took Trains in 1939, and in the UK as The Fugitive in 1940. Boschwitz died in 1942 when the boat he was travelling on, MV Abosso, was torpedoed by the Germans. The book failed to make an impact during its original release and was out of print shortly thereafter.

=== 2021 re-release ===
The book was re-discovered in the 2010s when Boschwitz's niece contacted the German editor Peter Graff regarding the novel. The original typescript of the book was re-discovered in 2016 in the archive of the National Library in Frankfurt. It was revised and edited by Graff using specific instructions Boschwitz had provided in letters to his mother.

The revised edition was released in 2021. This edition was met with widespread critical acclaim and positive reviews. It was translated into more than 20 languages within a year of its release. In 2021 it entered The Sunday Times's list of Top 10 hardback fiction bestsellers, more than 80 years after it was originally published.

Regarding the sequence of different train rides that Silbermann takes in the novel, The Guardian columnist Jonathan Freedland wrote that they were a "surreal, thickly claustrophobic atmosphere of an actual nightmare – a man repeating the same move over and over again, his goal permanently out of reach. The result is a story that is part John Buchan, part Franz Kafka and wholly riveting." Freedland also stated: "The Passenger is a gripping novel that plunges the reader into the gloom of Nazi Germany as the darkness was descending. It deserved to be read when it was written. It certainly deserves to be read now." Writing for The Sunday Times, Arts and Leisure managing editor David Mills felt that The Passenger was potentially one of the greatest novels written about the Second World War. Toby Lichtig, writing for The Wall Street Journal, described the novel as "at once a deeply satisfying novel and a vital historical document". He found that the book had "the immediacy of a novel written in a hurry", but "if the original was disordered, this version is cohesive and beautifully paced".

In a mixed review for the New York Times, author Michael Hofmann found The Passenger to be a "gripping" but "occasionally annoying" read that was the "work of a very young man, both urgent and perishable, written at some remove from the events and atmospheres it describes". Reading the book, Hofmann was reminded "that the perpetually displaced Boschwitz was writing through the haze of distance and under the impress of his own, more harmless memories of Germany before his exile." Chris Barsanti in a review on the Rain Taxi, writes that The Passenger shows the heat and speed of its composition. A number of its conversations can feel repetitive, while Silbermann's state of mind is not always clearly conveyed. But Boschwitz has a knack for illustrating a particular brand of racist self-delusion in which the non-Jewish German characters deny any responsibility for the dark forces harrying Silbermann. Like the woman to whom he opens himself up, they are uninterested in what happens to him, blame him for what is happening, or see no moral responsibility to help.

The Jewish Book Council wrote that "The Passenger offers an intimate portrait of Jewish life in prewar Nazi Germany at the onset of dehumanization, before the yellow star was imposed."
