= Ulrich Alexander Boschwitz =

German author (1915–1942)

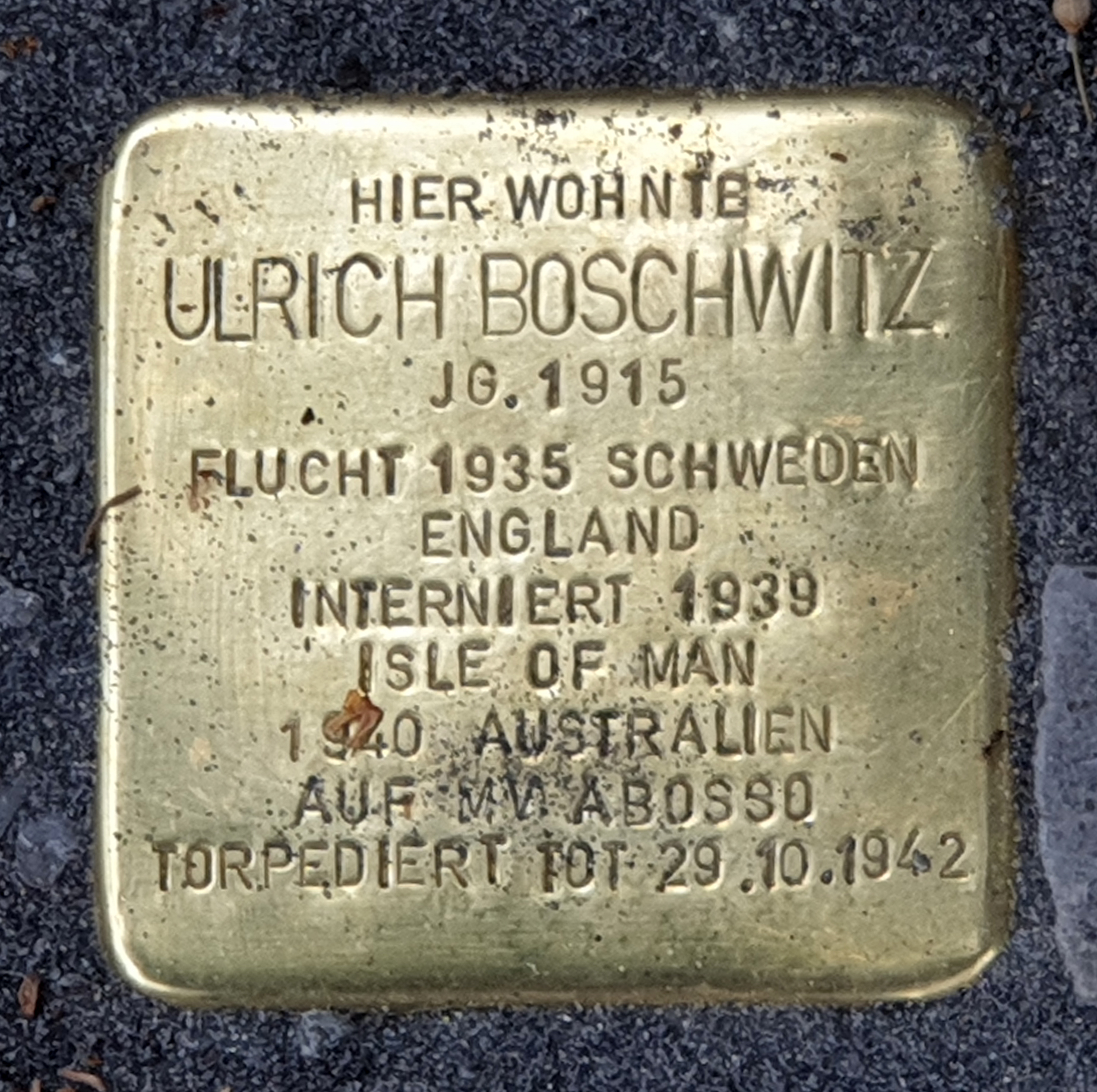
Stolperstein at Boschwitz's last residence in Berlin

Ulrich Alexander Boschwitz (19 April 1915 – 29 October 1942), pseudonym John Grane, was a German author.

== Life ==
Boschwitz was born in Berlin, the son of Salomon "Sally" Boschwitz and Martha Ella, née Wolgast. Salomon was a wealthy Jewish factory owner who had converted to Christianity in 1911, when he married Martha. Martha was descended from a prominent Lübeck patrician family, the Plitts, and had studied painting in Berlin and Munich. Salomon served in the Imperial German Army in World War I, but died on 7 May 1915 from a brain tumor, leaving Martha to raise Ulrich and his elder sister, Clarissa, and to carry on Salomon's business.

In 1935, Boschwitz's uncle, the lawyer Alexander Wolgast, was murdered in the street after criticizing the Nazis' anti-semitic Nuremberg Laws. The same year, Boschwitz received draft orders to join the Wehrmacht. Shortly thereafter, Boschwitz and his mother fled Germany for Norway; his sister, Clarissa, had already left Germany in 1933 for Palestine, where she would live the rest of her life.

In Norway, Boschwitz wrote his first novel, Menschen neben dem Leben (People Alongside Life), which was first published in Swedish, under the pseudonym John Grane, as Människor utanför, in 1937. From Sweden, he and his mother moved to Luxembourg, France, and Belgium, before ending in Britain in 1939. In either Belgium or Luxembourg, in response to the horrors of Kristallnacht, he wrote Der Reisende, which was published in English as The Man Who Took Trains (1939) in the United States and The Fugitive (1940) in the United Kingdom. The book failed to make an impact after it was originally published and was out of print shortly thereafter. However, in the 2010s the book was rediscovered and re-released as The Passenger. The revised and re-released edition was a massive success, being translated into over 20 languages and entering The Sunday Times's top ten list of best selling hardbacks more than 80 years after it was originally published.

When World War II broke out, Boschwitz and his mother were arrested by the British, classified as "enemy aliens", and interned on the Isle of Man. In July 1940, Boschwitz was deported to Australia, where he was interned at a camp in New South Wales. On the voyage there, on the HMT Dunera, a crew member threw the only draft of his latest work, Das Grosse Fressen (The Big Feast), into the ocean.

In Australia, Boschwitz worked on revising a second edition of Der Reisende and began a new novel, Traumtage (Dream Days). In 1942, he was freed and allowed to return to Britain. On 29 October, the vessel he was on, MV Abosso, was torpedoed and sunk by the German submarine U-575. Boschwitz, aged 27, was one of the 362 people on board who died. His last works died with him.

== Literary works ==
Posthumously, following the 2021 re-publication of Der Reisende, Boschwitz has been compared favourably to John Buchan, Franz Kafka, Thomas Mann, Heinrich Böll, and Hans Fallada.

His first novel, Menschen neben dem Leben (People Parallel to Life), recounts the lives of a variety of characters living through the economic crisis in Germany after the First World War. The novel was first published in a Swedish translation as Människor utanför in 1937. It was published in German in 2019 and translated by Philip Boehm in 2025 as Berlin Shuffle.

His second novel, Der Reisende, is set in Nazi Germany in November 1938 immediately after Kristallnacht. It was first published in London under his pseudonym John Grane in 1939 as The Man Who Took Trains and in America as The Fugitive in 1940. It was published in Germany in 2018. In 2022, the novel was published in a new translation by Philip Boehm, based on the original German manuscript and the author's own notes, and retitled The Passenger.

=== King Winter's Birthday ===
In 2024, Jonathan Freedland wrote a children's book titled King Winter's Birthday, which was inspired by Boschwitz's unpublished children's short story König Winters Geburstag: Ein Märchen (King Winter's Birthday: A Fairytale). Boschwitz left behind the manuscript of König Winters Geburstag: Ein Märchen, dreaming of the plot while held on the Isle of Man; the unpublished handwritten work, along with illustrations by Boschwitz's mother Martha Ella, had lain undisturbed in a New York archive for eighty years. British publisher Pushkin Press discovered Boschwitz's story and commissioned Freedland to translate it into English. On November 14, 2024, Pushkin Press published Freedland's translation of Boschwitz's manuscript as King Winter's Birthday, with illustrations by British artist Emily Sutton.

King Winter's Birthday is about the four seasons, personified as sibling monarchs. One day, King Winter invites his three siblings—Queen Spring, King Summer, and Queen Autumn—to celebrate his birthday at his palace and because he hasn't seen them in a long time.

Despite the sun and the winds warning him that having all four seasons in the same place and at the same time is a bad idea, King Winter nevertheless proceeds with his plans. Together for the first time in years, the four seasons have fun in King Winter's palace. Just as the sun and the winds have warned, however, weather patterns around the world get out of control: sunlight, rain, and snow come down at once; plants grow and wither within seconds; animals aren't sure whether to hibernate or to reproduce; and cities become flooded.

Upon seeing the consequences of their family reunion, the seasons decide to part ways for good and restore the balance in nature. Although King Winter is sad he would never be with his siblings again, he is happy whenever he remembers their brief time together.

== Legacy ==
Boschwitz's surviving papers eventually made their way to his sister, Clarissa. They were catalogued by Thomas Hansen in 1978 and donated and transferred to the Leo Baeck Institute in 2013 by Boschwitz's niece, Reuella Shachaf-Saltzberg. The collection includes various undated works, including poems, and correspondence and family photographs. They have been digitized and are available online as part of the Center for Jewish History Holocaust Resource Initiative, made possible by the Conference on Jewish Material Claims against Germany.
