= Guntram and Irene Rinke Foundation =

German literary award

The Guntram and Irene Rinke Foundation is a German nonprofit organization based in Hamburg that awarded an annual literary prize for nostalgic literature.

== Rinke prize winners ==
Year	Winner	Work
2007	Raoul Schrott and Wend Kässens	Dichter am Ball ("Poets on the Ball")
2008	Anonymous	Wohin mit Vater?
2009	Roger Willemsen	Der Knacks ("The Crack")
2010	Wilhelm Genazino	Das Glück in glücksfernen Zeiten
