= Das Glück in glücksfernen Zeiten =

2009 novel by Wilhelm Genazino

- Author: Wilhelm Genazino
- Language: German
- Publisher: Carl Hanser Verlag
- Publication date: 4 February 2009
- Publication place: Germany
- Pages: 160
- ISBN: 978-3-446-23265-5

Das Glück in glücksfernen Zeiten (transl. Happiness in Times Remote from Happiness) is a 2009 novel by the German writer Wilhelm Genazino.

== Plot ==
Gerhard Warlich lives in Frankfurt, is 41 years old and has a doctorate in philosophy on a dissertation on Martin Heidegger, but no prospect of a career in academia. He began working as a delivery driver for a laundry firm where he was able to become a managing director responsible for spying on his colleagues. His middle-class existence falls apart when he loses the job due to the surveillance measures at the workplace, wrongfully accused to have participated in anarchist activities he merely observed. Warlich avoids engaging in society beyond making observations for himself, but this leads to an existential crisis when his partner Traudl wants to start a family.

== Reception ==
Literaturkritik.de wrote that Genazino's portrayal of his main character—a philosopher who temporarily has success in a banal and alienated life—succeeds to create a "specific mixture of vivid realism in detail, mood evocation, abstraction and commentary". Der Spiegel called Genazino "a Meistersinger of the horrors of life", who breaks down the expectations of a successful life without dramatic exaggeration, resulting in a "clever and, despite its brevity, extraordinarily rich novel".

The book was awarded the Rinke Prize. It was one of six books nominated for the Leipzig Book Fair Prize in 2009.

== See also ==
- Flâneur
