= Raoul Schrott =

Austrian writer and critic

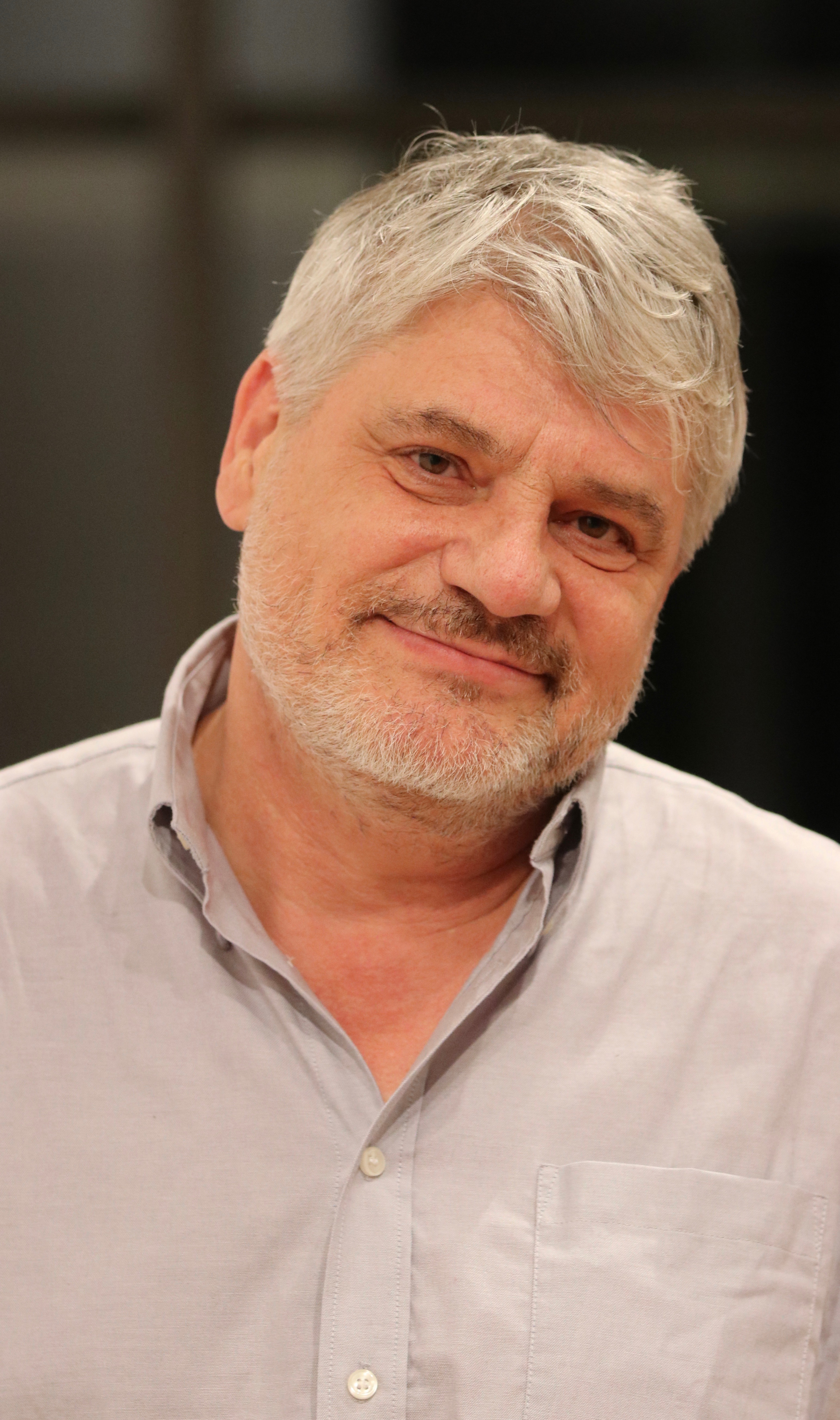
- Born: Raoul Schrott; 17 January 1965 (age 61); Landeck, Tyrol
- Occupations: Poet, literary critic
- Writing career
- Notable work: Dada 1921 – 1922 in Tirol

Raoul Schrott (born 17 January 1964) is an Austrian poet, writer, literary critic, translator, humanities scholar and broadcast personality.

Schrott was raised in Tunis, Tunisia, where his father served as an Austrian sales representative. He attended the universities of Norwich, Paris, Berlin and Innsbruck. He completed a thesis on "Dada 1921 – 1922 in Tirol". He translated Homer's writings into colloquial German. In 2008 he was appointed Visiting professor by the Free University Berlin. In 2019 he was a contributor to A New Divan: A Lyrical Dialogue Between East and West (Gingko Library). He currently lives in Austria.

== Awards ==
- Award of the Country of Carinthia at the Ingeborg-Bachmann-Competition, 1994
- Leonce-und-Lena-Preis 1995
- Rauris Literature Prize, 1996
- Sponsorship award of the Friedrich-Hölderlin-Prize 1996
- Berlin Literary Award, 1996
- Peter Huchel Prize, 1999
- Mainzer Stadtschreiber, 2004
- Joseph-Breitbach-Preis, 2004
- Prize of the Guntram and Irene Rinke Foundation, 2007

== Works (in German) ==
- Dada 1921 – 1922 in Tirol. Universität Innsbruck, Dissertation 1988
- Dada 21/22. Musikalische Fischsuppe mit Reiseeindrücken. Eine Dokumentation über die beiden Dadajahre in Tirol. Haymon, Innsbruck 1988. ISBN 3-85218-037-6
- Makame. Gedichte. Haymon, Innsbruck 1989. ISBN 3-85218-061-9
- Walter Serner 1889–1942 und Dada. Ein Forschungsbericht mit neuen Dokumenten. Reihe: Vergessene Autoren der Moderne, 41. Anhang: Gemeinschaftsarbeiten von Arp, Serner und Tzara. Universität Siegen 1989 ISSN 0177-9869
- Die Legenden vom Tod. Mit Bildern von Adolf Frohner. Haymon, Innsbruck 1990. ISBN 3-85218-079-1
- Dada 15/25. Haymon, Innsbruck 1992. ISBN 3-85218-117-8
- Dadautriche 1907–1970. Herausgegeben von Günther Dankl und Raoul Schrott. Mit Beiträgen von Raoul Schrott u. a. Haymon, Innsbruck 1993. ISBN 3-85218-141-0
- Sub Rosa. Mit Zeichnungen von Arnold Mario Dall'o. Haymon, Innsbruck 1993. ISBN 3-85218-126-7
- Finis Terrae. Ein Nachlass. Haymon, Innsbruck 1995. ISBN 3-85218-197-6
- Hotels. Haymon, Innsbruck 1995. ISBN 3-85218-193-3
- Die Erfindung der Poesie. Gedichte aus den ersten viertausend Jahren. Reihe: Die Andere Bibliothek, 154. Eichborn, Frankfurt 1997. ISBN 3-8218-4154-0
- Fragmente einer Sprache der Dichtung im europäischen Kontext. Poetische Strukturen von der griechischen Antike bis zum Dadaismus. Habilitationsschrift. Universität Innsbruck, Innsbruck 1997
- Tropen. Über das Erhabene. Hanser, Munich 1998. ISBN 3-446-19502-5
- Die Erde ist blau wie eine Orange. Polemisches, Poetisches, Privates. dtv, München 1999. ISBN 3-423-12704-X
- Fragmente einer Sprache der Dichtung. Graz 1997 ISBN 3-85420-471-X
- Bakchen, nach Euripides. Hanser, Munich 1999. ISBN 3-446-19811-3 (2000 uraufgeführt am Wiener Burgtheater)
- Die Musen. Ungekürzte, vom Autor neu durchges. Ausgabe. dtv, Munich 2000. ISBN 3-423-12788-0
- Die Wüste Lop Nor. Novelle. Hanser, Munich 2000. ISBN 3-446-19921-7
- Gilgamesh Epos. Fischer, Frankfurt 2001, 2004. ISBN 3-596-15703-X (uraufgeführt am Wiener Akademietheater)
- Das Geschlecht der Engel, der Himmel der Heiligen: ein Brevier. Hanser, Munich 2001. ISBN 3-446-20020-7
- Khamsin. Fischer, Frankfurt 2002. ISBN 3-10-073540-4 (Enth. außerdem: Die Namen der Wüste)
- Tristan da Cunha oder Die Hälfte der Erde. Roman. Hanser, München 2003. ISBN 3-446-20355-9
- Der wölfische Hunger, über das Alter der Jugend. Gollenstein, Blieskastel 2004. ISBN 3-935731-77-9
- Weissbuch. Hanser, München 2004. ISBN 3-446-20540-3
- Handbuch der Wolkenputzerei. Gesammelte Essays. Hanser, Munich 2005. ISBN 3-446-20576-4
- Die fünfte Welt, ein Logbuch. Haymon, Innsbruck 2007. ISBN 978-3-85218-524-8
- Homers Heimat. Der Kampf um Troia und seine realen Hintergründe. Hanser, Munich 2008. ISBN 978-3-446-23023-1[18]
- Ilias. Neu übertragen von Raoul Schrott. Hanser, Munich 2008. ISBN 978-3-446-23046-0
- Die Politik des Heiligen in: Lettre International 88, 2010
- Die Blüte des nackten Körpers. Liebesgedichte aus dem Alten Ägypten. Übertragen von R. S. Hanser, Munich 2010. ISBN 978-3-446-23485-7
- Liebesgedichte. Nachwort Oliver Lubrich. Insel, Frankfurt 2010. ISBN 3-458-35302-X
- with Arthur Jacobs: Gehirn und Gedicht. Wie wir unsere Wirklichkeit konstruieren, Carl Hanser Verlag, Munich 2011 ISBN 978-3-446-23656-1
- Das schweigende Kind, Erzählung, Carl Hanser Verlag, Munich 2012, ISBN 978-3-446-23864-0
- Erste Erde Epos. Hanser, Munich 2016, ISBN 978-3-446-25282-0
- Eine Geschichte des Windes oder Von dem deutschen Kanonier der erstmals die Welt umrundete und dann ein zweites und ein drittes Mal, Novel, Carl Hanser Verlag, Munich 2019 ISBN 978-3-446-26380-2
- Inventur des Sommers. Carl Hanser Verlag, Munich 2023, ISBN 978-3-446-27633-8
- Atlas der Sternenhimmel und Schöpfungsmythen der Menschheit. Carl Hanser Verlag, Munich 2024, ISBN 978-3-446-28122-6

=== As editor ===
- Jahrbuch der Lyrik. Ed. with Christoph Buchwald. Fischer, Frankfurt o. M. 1999ff. ISSN 0942-9093

== Trivia ==
- Between 1988 and 2008 Schrott published 22 books.
- Schrott has translated Homer's Iliad into a contemporary German idiom with many colloquialisms.
- Schrott has translated the Epic of Gilgamesh to contemporary German.
