= Minka Pradelski =

German sociologist and documentary filmmaker

- Born: 1947 (age 77–78); Zeilsheim, Germany
- Occupation: Filmmaker

Minka Pradelski (born 1947 in Zeilsheim, Frankfurt am Main) is a German sociologist and documentary filmmaker. Her parents were Holocaust survivors and she is an honorary member of the Shoah Foundation. Her first novel Here Comes Mrs. Kugelman appeared in 2005 and was translated into English by Philip Boehm.
