= MV Abosso =

Passenger, mail, and cargo liner

Coordinates: 48°18′N 28°30′W

History

United Kingdom
- Name: Abosso
- Owner: Elder Dempster Lines
- Operator: Elder Dempster Lines
- Port of registry: (United Kingdom) Liverpool
- Builder: Cammell Laird, Birkenhead
- Yard number: 1006
- Launched: 19 June 1935
- Completed: 8 September 1935
- Maiden voyage: 16 October 1935
- Identification: UK official number 165246; Call sign MKKS
- Fate: Torpedoed and sunk 29 October 1942

General characteristics
- Type: passenger liner
- Tonnage: 11,330 GRT; tonnage under deck 7,569; 6,743 NRT
- Length: 460.8 ft (140.5 m) p/p
- Beam: 65.2 ft (19.9 m)
- Depth: 31.5 ft (9.6 m)
- Decks: 3 plus shade deck
- Installed power: 1,660 NHP; 7,200 bhp
- Propulsion: Diesel engines, twin screw
- Speed: 14.5 knots (26.9 km/h)
- Capacity: 251 1st class; 74 2nd class; 332 3rd class
- Crew: 182, plus in wartime; 20 DEMS gunners
- Sensors & processing systems: wireless direction finding; echo sounding device
- Armament: 1 × QF 4 inch gun; 2 × Oerlikon 20 mm cannon; 2 × twin Marlin machine guns; 6 × Lewis guns; 2 × "pig trough" rocket launchers; 4 × PAC rockets

MV Abosso was a passenger, mail, and cargo liner, the flagship of Elder Dempster Lines. In peacetime she ran scheduled services between Liverpool and West Africa. In the Second World War she was a troop ship, running between the United Kingdom, West Africa, and South Africa.

Abosso was built in 1935 and sunk by German submarine U-575 in 1942, killing 362 of the 393 people aboard. She carried the same name as an earlier Elder Dempster ship, SS Abosso, which had been built in 1912 and sunk by the submarine U-43 in 1917.

== Building and service ==
Cammell Laird of Birkenhead, England, built Abosso for Elder Dempster Lines in 1935. She was launched on 19 June, completed on 8 September and began her maiden voyage on 16 October.

Abosso was a motor ship, with two eight-cylinder two-stroke single-acting marine diesel engines driving twin screws and a combined rating of 1,660 NHP. Her navigation equipment included wireless direction finding and an echo sounding device.

Abosso's accommodation had capacity for 250 1st class, 74 2nd class, and 332 3rd class passengers arranged over three decks. She had refrigeration equipment for carrying perishable cargo in her holds.

Abosso's regular peacetime route was between Liverpool and Apapa, Nigeria. By the standards of her era Abosso was a small ocean liner, but she was the largest ship in Elder Dempster's fleet.

On 27 June 1939 in dense fog 22 nautical miles (41 km) off Ushant in France, Abosso was involved in a collision with the 815 GRT British coaster Yewforest. Both ships survived the incident.

In the Second World War Abosso was converted into a Defensively Equipped Merchant Ship, and 20 DEMS gunners were added to her regular crew. She served primarily as a troop ship but also continued to carry civilian passengers between Africa and the UK.

On 24 May 1941 a Luftwaffe Focke-Wulf Fw 200 Condor aircraft attacked Abosso, but the ship survived with only slight damage.

== Final voyage and sinking ==
Approximate position of Abosso's wreck in the North Atlantic

On 8 October 1942 Abosso left Cape Town, South Africa for Liverpool carrying 210 passengers: 149 military and 61 civilians, including 44 internees, among them the German-born and Jewish author Ulrich Alexander Boschwitz, 10 women with children and two or three British distressed seamen (the official term for abandoned seamen away from home without a ship for various reasons). Her DEMS gunners were 13 from the Royal Artillery Maritime Regiment and seven from the Royal Navy. She was also carrying 400 bags of mail in her mail room and 3,000 tons of wool in her holds.

Her military passengers included 50 or 51 Dutch conscripts, 44 newly trained pilots fresh from No 23 Service Flying Training School, X Flight, Advanced Training Squadron, at Heany, Bulawayo, Southern Rhodesia (40 for the RAF and four for the Fleet Air Arm), and 33 or 34 Dutch submariners being transferred to a new submarine. The submariners were from three Royal Netherlands Navy submarines: HNLMS K IX and HNLMS K XII, both of which had been transferred to the Royal Australian Navy; and HNLMS K X, which had been scuttled in the Dutch East Indies to prevent her capture by invading Japanese forces. They were travelling to take over a U-class submarine that Vickers-Armstrongs was building at Barrow-in-Furness and was intended to be launched as HNLMS Haai.

Abosso sailed alone and unescorted, despite having a top speed of only 14.5 knots (26.9 km/h). A commander of the Dutch submariners, Luitenant ter zee der 1e klasse Henry Coumou, objected beforehand that this was an unreasonable risk to take, but British authorities overruled him.

At 22:13 on Thursday 29 October 1942 Abosso was in the Atlantic about 589 nautical miles (1,091 km) north of the Azores when German submarine U-575, commanded by Kapitänleutnant Günther Heydemann, fired a spread of four torpedoes at her. One hit Abosso's port side abaft her bridge. The ship's engines stopped, all her lights failed, and she started to list heavily to port. Heydemann survived the war and became a successful businessman in Germany.

Abosso had 12 lifeboats. The even-numbered boats were on her port side and it is not clear whether any of them was launched. The odd-numbered boats were on her starboard side. As No. 3 boat was being lowered, one of its falls was let go and all of the boat's occupants were thrown into the water. No. 3 boat seems to have been carrying most of the Dutch submariners. No. 5 boat was launched successfully and managed to rescue four of the Dutch from the water. No. 9 boat was also launched successfully. It was a motor boat and moved around picking up survivors from the water.

As Abosso settled in the water, she temporarily righted herself, her crew got her emergency generator working, and her floodlights were switched on to help the evacuation. Almost immediately after this, U-575 fired a torpedo from one of her stern torpedo tubes, which hit Abosso at 22:28 (Berlin time) forward of her bridge. At 2305 hrs (Berlin time) Abosso sank bow first. The submarine then surfaced, approached the débris area, and scanned the boats with her searchlights. Kptlt. Heydemann reported about 10 lifeboats and 15 to 20 liferafts afloat and occupied. Heydemann did not try to question survivors to identify the ship, and claimed in his report that this was because the weather was poor.

== Rescue of survivors ==
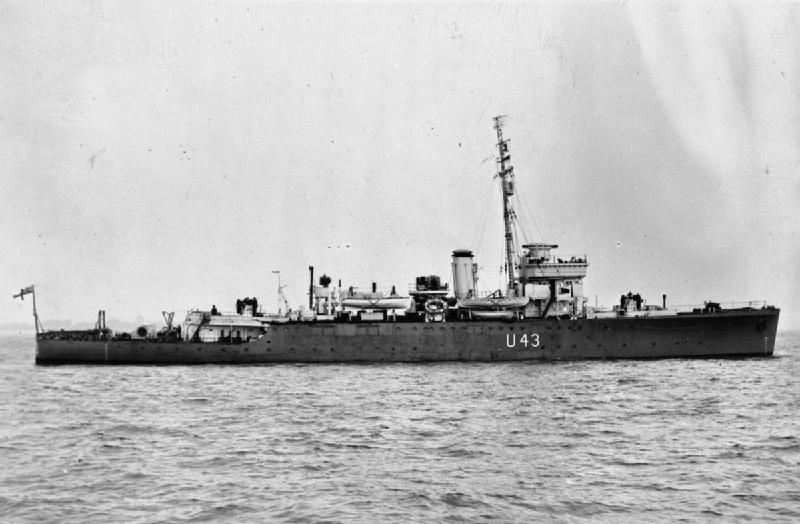
HMS Bideford rescued the only survivors from Abosso

No. 5 boat was leaking badly and her crew were busy using their seaboots and empty cans to bale water out of her. At about 01:30 (local time) on 30 October they lost contact with the other lifeboats. Overnight the boat's crew rowed to keep the boat headed into the sea; at daybreak they raised her mast and hoisted a sail. At about 16:00 (local time) they deployed the boat's sea anchor overnight. At daybreak on 31 October they resumed sailing, and a few hours later sailed into sight of an Allied convoy.

This was Convoy KMS-2, which was sailing from the UK to the Mediterranean for Operation Torch, the Allied invasion of Vichy French North Africa. One of the convoy's escorts, the Shoreham-class sloop HMS Bideford, sighted No. 5 boat and at 11:00 rescued its 31 occupants. HMS Bideford, part of Operation Torch, stopped to pick up the survivors only after permission was given by the admiralty in London by radio communication. Normally stopping for survivors was forbidden. They were 17 military and civilian passengers, 12 crew, and two DEMS gunners. Among the survivors were one of the 10 women passengers, an RAMC Captain, and an RAF pilot officer, William Thomson. Bideford landed them at Gibraltar three days later. No. 5 boat's occupants were the only survivors: the other lifeboats and rafts were never found. A total of 362 people had died, including Abosso's Master, Reginald Tate and another Merchant Navy captain, Edward Davies. Boschwitz also perished.

Among the few survivors were Lieutenant Coumou and three of his fellow-submariners. The Dutch Navy was unable to replace its 30 lost men, so the U-class submarine at Barrow was launched not for the Dutch Navy but as the Royal Norwegian Navy submarine HNoMS Ula.

== Monuments ==
The 362 people killed in Abosso's sinking have no grave but the sea. The Second World War part of the Tower Hill Memorial in the City of London lists those who were members of her Merchant Navy crew. The Brookwood Memorial in Surrey lists those who were UK or Commonwealth military personnel, such as the newly qualified RAF and Fleet Air Arm pilots. 21 of the victims are commemorated at Singapore's War Memorial, 19 on the War Memorial at El Alamein in Egypt, and one on the Australian War Memorial at Canberra. Corporal Hendrik Roelof Drost is commemorated on the memorial of Dutch Citizens from South Africa which was erected in the gardens of the Dutch Embassy in Pretoria, Gauteng, South Africa.

== Sources and further reading ==
- Cowden, James; Duffy, John (1986). The Elder Dempster Fleet History 1852–1985. Coltishall: Mallett and Bell. ISBN 0950945315.
- Harnack, Edwin P (1938) [1903]. All About Ships & Shipping (7th ed.). London: Faber and Faber. p. 469.
- Talbot-Booth, E.C. (1942) [1936]. Ships and the Sea (Seventh ed.). London: Sampson Low, Marston & Co. Ltd. pp. 404, 461.
