= HMCS Prince Rupert =

River-class frigate

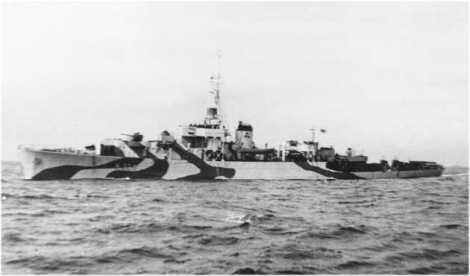
- HMCS Prince Rupert

History

Canada
- Name: Prince Rupert
- Namesake: Prince Rupert, British Columbia
- Operator: Royal Canadian Navy
- Ordered: October 1941
- Builder: Yarrows, Esquimalt
- Laid down: 1 August 1942
- Launched: 3 February 1943
- Commissioned: 30 August 1943
- Decommissioned: 15 January 1946
- Identification: pennant number: K 324
- Honours and awards: Atlantic 1944
- Fate: Sold 1947, hull expended as breakwater 1948

General characteristics
- Class & type: River-class frigate
- Displacement: 1,445 long tons (1,468 t; 1,618 short tons); 2,110 long tons (2,140 t; 2,360 short tons) (deep load)
- Length: 283 ft (86.26 m) p/p; 301.25 ft (91.82 m)o/a
- Beam: 36.5 ft (11.13 m)
- Draught: 9 ft (2.74 m); 13 ft (3.96 m) (deep load)
- Propulsion: 2 x Admiralty 3-drum boilers, 2 shafts, reciprocating vertical triple expansion, 5,500 ihp (4,100 kW)
- Speed: 20 knots (37.0 km/h); 20.5 knots (38.0 km/h) (turbine ships)
- Range: 646 long tons (656 t; 724 short tons) oil fuel; 7,500 nautical miles (13,890 km) at 15 knots (27.8 km/h)
- Complement: 157
- Armament: 2 × QF 4 in (102 mm) /45 Mk. XVI on twin mount HA/LA Mk.XIX; 1 × QF 12 pdr (3 in (76 mm)) 12 cwt /40 Mk. V on mounting HA/LA Mk.IX (not all ships); 8 × 20 mm QF Oerlikon A/A on twin mounts Mk.V; 1 × Hedgehog 24 spigot A/S projector; up to 150 depth charges

HMCS Prince Rupert was a River-class frigate that served with the Royal Canadian Navy during the Second World War. She served primarily as a convoy escort in the Battle of the Atlantic. She was named for Prince Rupert, British Columbia.

Prince Rupert was ordered in October 1941 as part of the 1942–1943 River-class building program. She was laid down on 1 August 1942 by Yarrows Ltd. at Esquimalt and launched 3 February 1943. She was commissioned into the Royal Canadian Navy on 30 August 1943 at Esquimalt.

== Background ==
The River-class frigate was designed by William Reed of Smith's Dock Company of South Bank-on-Tees. Originally called a "twin-screw corvette", its purpose was to improve on the convoy escort classes in service with the Royal Navy at the time, including the Flower-class corvette. The first orders were placed by the Royal Navy in 1940 and the vessels were named for rivers in the United Kingdom, giving name to the class. In Canada they were named for towns and cities though they kept the same designation. The name "frigate" was suggested by Vice-Admiral Percy Nelles of the Royal Canadian Navy and was adopted later that year.

Improvements over the corvette design included improved accommodation which was markedly better. The twin engines gave only three more knots of speed but extended the range of the ship to nearly double that of a corvette at 7,200 nautical miles (13,300 km) at 12 knots. Among other lessons applied to the design was an armament package better designed to combat U-boats including a twin 4-inch mount forward and 12-pounder aft. 15 Canadian frigates were initially fitted with a single 4-inch gun forward but with the exception of HMCS Valleyfield, they were all eventually upgraded to the double mount. For underwater targets, the River-class frigate was equipped with a Hedgehog anti-submarine mortar and depth charge rails aft and four side-mounted throwers.

River-class frigates were the first Royal Canadian Navy warships to carry the 147B Sword horizontal fan echo sonar transmitter in addition to the irregular ASDIC. This allowed the ship to maintain contact with targets even while firing unless a target was struck. Improved radar and direction-finding equipment improved the RCN's ability to find and track enemy submarines over the previous classes.

Canada originally ordered the construction of 33 frigates in October 1941. The design was too big for the shipyards on the Great Lakes so all the frigates built in Canada were built in dockyards along the west coast or along the St. Lawrence River. In all Canada ordered the construction of 60 frigates including ten for the Royal Navy that transferred two to the United States Navy.

== War service ==
20mm gunfire from Prince Rupert striking water to port of U-575

After working up at Pictou, Prince Rupert was assigned to the Mid-Ocean Escort Force escort group C-3 as Senior Officer's Ship. She was used a trans-Atlantic convoy escort until November 1944. On 13 March 1944, Prince Rupert, alongside USS Haverfield, USS Hobson and aircraft from American and British services, sank U-575 in the North Atlantic. When the U-boat was spotted by an RCAF patrol plane, Prince Rupert was detached from the convoy and sped to the sighting. There alongside the aforementioned units, she fought for five hours to sink U-575. In the end the U-boat surfaced and Prince Rupert helped carry off the survivors, saving fourteen of the sinking submarine's crew.

In November 1944, Prince Rupert began a refit at Liverpool, Nova Scotia which was completed in March 1945. She returned to active service with escort group EG 27, based out of Halifax and remained with them until June 1945, when she sailed for Esquimalt. Upon reaching Esquimalt, Prince Rupert underwent tropicalization refit in preparation for service in the southern Pacific Ocean. This meant adding refrigeration, water-cooling capabilities and a change to her camouflage pattern. However this refit was cancelled when Japan surrendered. She was paid off there on 15 January 1946. She was sold in 1947 to Capital Iron & Metals Ltd. of Victoria, British Columbia. Her hull was stripped and expended as a breakwater at Royston, British Columbia in 1948.
