= The Shoe Tester of Frankfurt =

2001 novel by Wilhelm Genazino

- Author: Wilhelm Genazino
- Original title: Ein Regenschirm für diesen Tag
- Translator: Philip Boehm
- Language: German
- Publisher: Carl Hanser Verlag
- Publication date: 2001
- Publication place: Germany
- English publication date: 1 June 2006
- Pages: 176
- ISBN: 9783446200494

The Shoe Tester of Frankfurt (German: Ein Regenschirm für diesen Tag) is a 2001 novel by the German writer Wilhelm Genazino. It is a flâneur novel about a man who works for a high-end shoe company and encounters various people from his past in Frankfurt.

The book became a bestseller in Germany and a late breakthrough for Genazino, who was approaching his 60s at the time. It was published in English translation by Philip Boehm in 2006.
