= Jensen P66 =

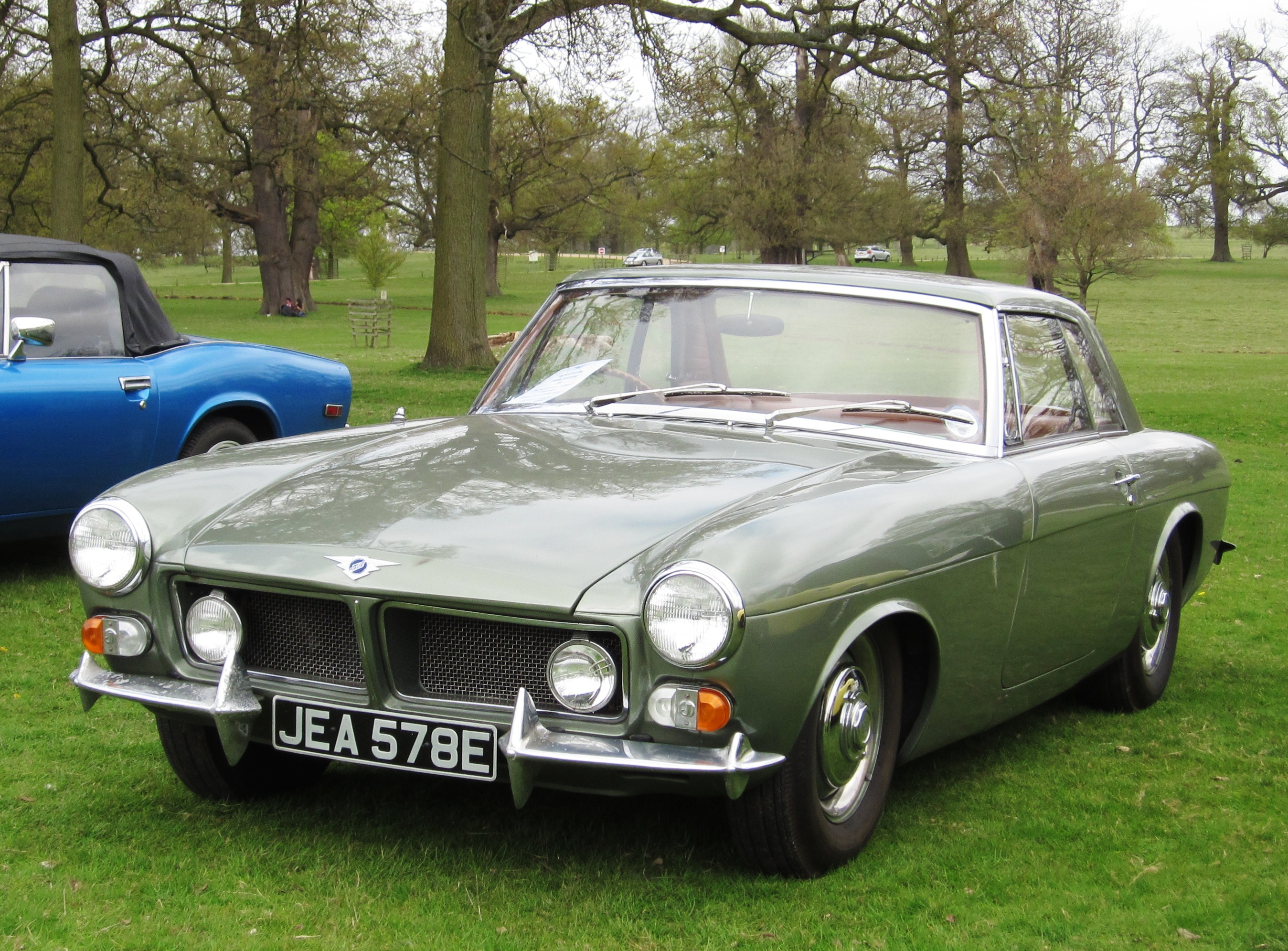
- Jensen P66 coupé

Overview
- Manufacturer: Jensen
- Production: 1965; 2 made
- Designer: Eric Neale (styling)

Body and chassis
- Class: Grand tourer
- Body style: 2-door 2+2 seat coupé 2-door 2+2 convertible

Powertrain
- Engine: 4.5L Chrysler V8; 6.2L Chrysler V8
- Transmission: 3-speed TorqueFlite automatic 4 speed manual

Dimensions
- Wheelbase: 102 in (2,591 mm)
- Length: 176 in (4,470 mm)
- Width: 69 in (1,753 mm)
- Height: 51 in (1,295 mm)
- Curb weight: 25 cwt (1270 kg)

Jensen P66 was a model range planned by Jensen Motors in the 1960s, which was aborted after two examples were made and one was exhibited at the 1965 London Motor Show.

The P66 was planned as a replacement for the Austin-Healey 3000, which at that time Jensen was assembling at their factory in West Bromwich. BMC was planning to drop the Healey, and Jensen asked Eric Neale, their house stylist, to design a replacement for the US market. In a break from their recent tradition of using glassfibre, he used an aluminium body on a steel platform and tube chassis. The optional engine continued to be a 6.2-litre Chrysler V8, similar to that used in the contemporary CV8, or a 4.5-litre in stock form. The car was priced at £2,200 in the UK against £3,500 for the CV8, and would possibly have been renamed as Interceptor if put into production.

The reception to the convertible was generally favourable, although the press criticised the strakes over the wheel arches as outdated. A hardtop version was also produced with plain wheel arches. The company founders, Richard and Alan Jensen, favoured putting the model into production. The Norcros group had been controlling the company for some years and preferred to adopt an Italian-style body, a view shared by Managing Director Brian Owen and Deputy Chief Engineer Kevin Beattie. They also wanted a direct replacement to the outgoing C-V8, rather than a less expensive model to replace the Austin Healey. They approached Touring of Milan who produced a rival design that was put into production by Vignale as the Interceptor.

After making some changes to the Touring design to make it suitable for tooling, Eric Neale felt that he had no role left in the company and resigned. He was followed by the Jensen brothers.

The convertible P66 was soon broken up, the parts and the other hardtop model being sold on. The second hardtop model has survived in original condition and has been used regularly; following a thorough rebuild, it won Car of the Show at the 'Classic & Sports Car' Club Awards at the 2015 Lancaster Insurance Classic Motor Show.

P66 Jensen Original Brochure, 1965

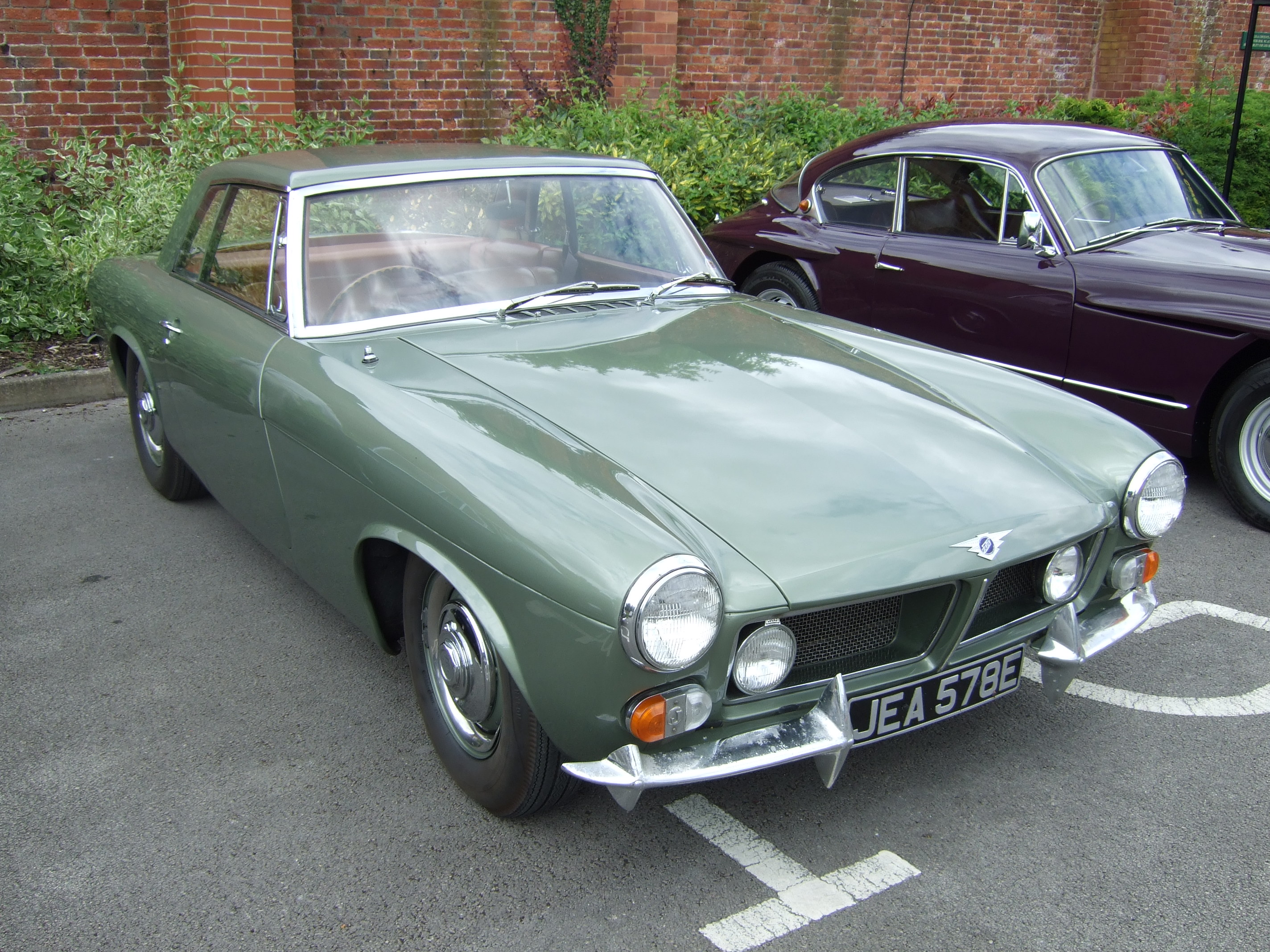
Jensen P66 coupé

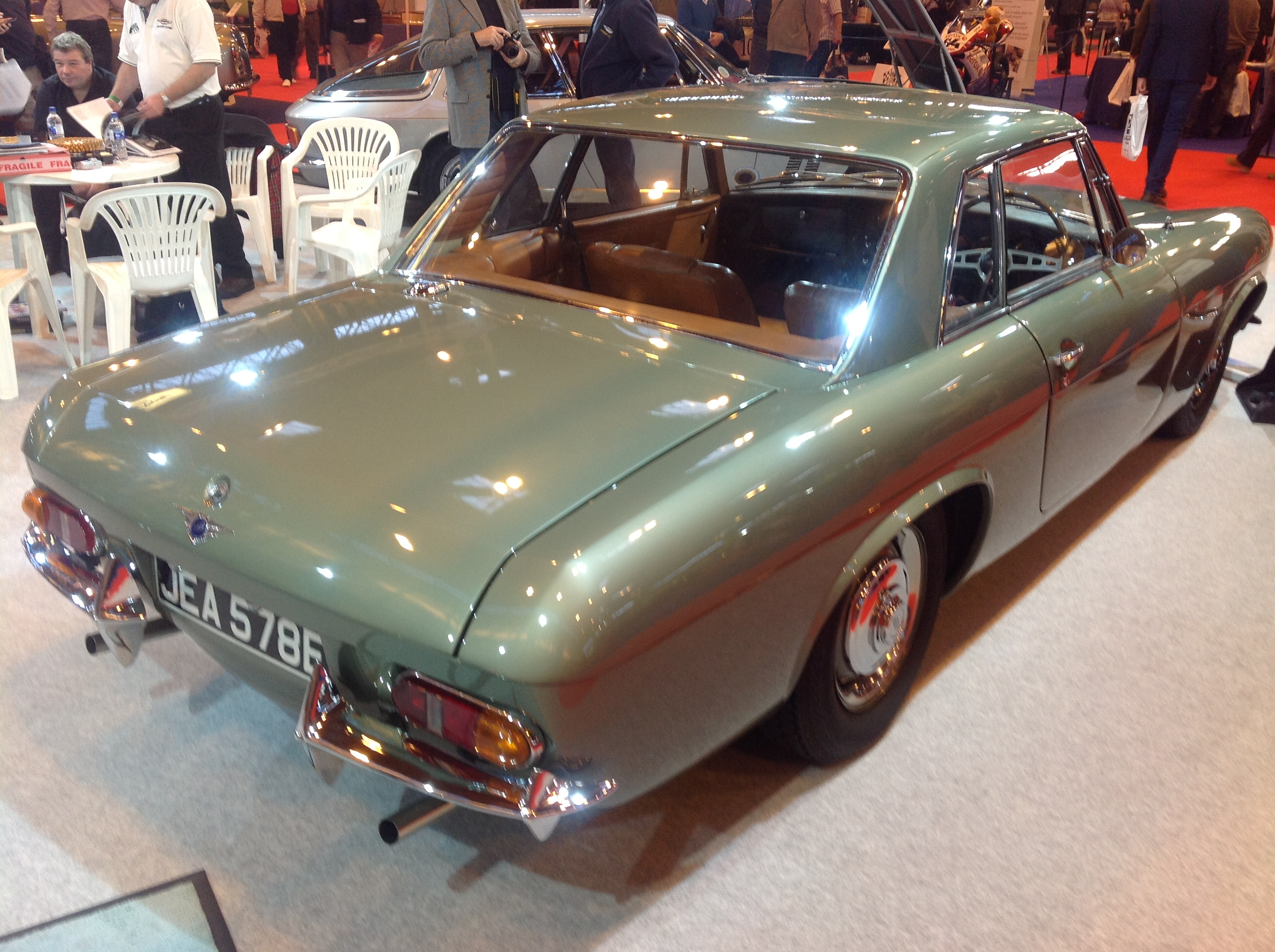
Jensen P66 coupé rear
