= Günther Heydemann =

German naval officer and u-boat commander

- Born: 11 January 1914; Greifswald, German Empire
- Died: 2 January 1986 (aged 71); Hamburg-Wedel, West Germany
- Military career
- Allegiance: Nazi Germany
- Branch: Kriegsmarine
- Service years: 1933–1945
- Rank: Kapitänleutnant
- Units: SSS Gorch Fock cruiser Karlsruhe; Schlesien; Schleswig-Holstein
- Commands: U-575
- Conflicts: Battle of the Atlantic
- Awards: Knight's Cross of the Iron Cross

Günther Heydemann (11 January 1914 – 2 January 1986) was a German U-boat commander in the Kriegsmarine of Nazi Germany in World War II. He was a recipient of the Knight's Cross of the Iron Cross. Prior to taking command of U-575, Heydemann made two war patrols as watch officer on board U-69 under the command of Kapitänleutnant Jost Metzler.

== World War II ==
From 15 September to 2 October 1941, Heydemann, as commander of U-575, was part of Wolfpack Brandenburg operating southeast of Greenland in the North Atlantic. On 2 October, Heydemann sank Tuva of 4,652 gross register tons (GRT). On U-575's third war patrol which was part of the second wave of Operation Drumbeat, also referred to as the Second Happy Time, Heydemann was given a special task and did not sink any ships. On U-575's fourth war patrol which was part of the fifth wave of Operation Drumbeat, Heydemann sank Robin Hood of 6,887 GRT on 16 April 1942.

== Summary of career ==
As commander of U-575 Günther Heydmann is credited with the sinking of eight ships for a total of 48,920 gross register tons (GRT).

=== Awards ===
- Wehrmacht Long Service Award 4th Class (1 April 1937)
- Iron Cross (1939)
  - 2nd Class (17 September 1939)
  - 1st Class (12 April 1941)
- U-boat War Badge (1939) (12 April 1941)
- Knight's Cross of the Iron Cross on 3 July 1943 Kapitänleutnant and commander of U-575
