= German submarine U-575 =

German World War II submarine

- The crew after return from seventh patrol

History

Nazi Germany
- Name: U-575
- Ordered: 8 January 1940
- Builder: Blohm & Voss, Hamburg
- Yard number: 551
- Laid down: 1 August 1940
- Launched: 30 April 1941
- Commissioned: 19 June 1941
- Nickname(s): Liliput
- Fate: Sunk on 13 March 1944

General characteristics
- Class & type: Type VIIC submarine
- Displacement: 769 tonnes (757 long tons) surfaced; 871 t (857 long tons) submerged
- Length: 67.10 m (220 ft 2 in) o/a; 50.50 m (165 ft 8 in) pressure hull
- Beam: 6.20 m (20 ft 4 in) o/a; 4.70 m (15 ft 5 in) pressure hull
- Height: 9.60 m (31 ft 6 in)
- Draught: 4.74 m (15 ft 7 in)
- Installed power: 2,800–3,200 PS (2,100–2,400 kW; 2,800–3,200 bhp) (diesels); 750 PS (550 kW; 740 shp) (electric)
- Propulsion: 2 shafts; 2 × diesel engines; 2 × electric motors
- Speed: 17.7 knots (32.8 km/h; 20.4 mph) surfaced; 7.6 knots (14.1 km/h; 8.7 mph) submerged
- Range: 8,500 nmi (15,700 km; 9,800 mi) at 10 knots (19 km/h; 12 mph) surfaced; 80 nmi (150 km; 92 mi) at 4 knots (7.4 km/h; 4.6 mph) submerged
- Test depth: 230 m (750 ft); Crush depth: 250–295 m (820–968 ft)
- Complement: 4 officers, 40–56 enlisted
- Armament: 5 × 53.3 cm (21 in) torpedo tubes (four bow, one stern); 14 × torpedoes or 26 TMA mines; 1 × 8.8 cm (3.46 in) deck gun (220 rounds); 1 x 2 cm (0.79 in) C/30 AA gun

Service record
- Part of: 7th U-boat Flotilla; 19 June 1941 – 13 March 1944
- Identification codes: M 44 068
- Commanders: Kptlt. Günther Heydemann; 19 June 1941 – 29 July 1943; Oblt.z.S. Wolfgang Boehmer; 12 September 1943 – 13 March 1944
- Operations: 10 patrols: 1st patrol: 8 September – 9 October 1941; 2nd patrol: 9 November – 17 December 1941; 3rd patrol: 14 January – 26 February 1942; 4th patrol: 24 March – 14 May 1942; 5th patrol: 10 June – 7 August 1942; 6th patrol: 16 September – 8 November 1942; 7th patrol: 17 December 1942 – 18 February 1943; 8th patrol: 22 April – 11 June 1943; 9th patrol: a. 20 – 22 September 1943; b. 25 – 27 September 1943; c. 28 – 30 September 1943; d. 6 October – 28 November 1943; 10th patrol: 29 February – 13 March 1944
- Victories: 8 merchant ships sunk (36,010 GRT); 1 warship sunk (1,015 tons); 1 merchant ship damaged (12,910 GRT)

German submarine U-575 was a Type VIIC U-boat in service of Nazi Germany's Kriegsmarine during World War II. She carried out ten patrols, sailing for 472 days and sinking eight ships totalling 36,010 gross register tons (GRT) and damaged one other of 12,910 GRT. She was a member of 18 separate wolfpacks and was sunk north of the Azores by Allied ships and aircraft on 13 March 1944.

== Design ==
German Type VIIC submarines were preceded by the shorter Type VIIB submarines. U-575 had a displacement of 769 tonnes (757 long tons) when at the surface and 871 tonnes (857 long tons) while submerged. She had a total length of 67.10 m (220 ft 2 in), a pressure hull length of 50.50 m (165 ft 8 in), a beam of 6.20 m (20 ft 4 in), a height of 9.60 m (31 ft 6 in), and a draught of 4.74 m (15 ft 7 in). The submarine was powered by two Germaniawerft F46 four-stroke, six-cylinder supercharged diesel engines producing a total of 2,800 to 3,200 metric horsepower (2,060 to 2,350 kW; 2,760 to 3,160 shp) for use while surfaced, two Brown, Boveri & Cie GG UB 720/8 double-acting electric motors producing a total of 750 metric horsepower (550 kW; 740 shp) for use while submerged. She had two shafts and two 1.23 m (4 ft) propellers. The boat was capable of operating at depths of up to 230 metres (750 ft).

The submarine had a maximum surface speed of 17.7 knots (32.8 km/h; 20.4 mph) and a maximum submerged speed of 7.6 knots (14.1 km/h; 8.7 mph). When submerged, the boat could operate for 80 nautical miles (150 km; 92 mi) at 4 knots (7.4 km/h; 4.6 mph); when surfaced, she could travel 8,500 nautical miles (15,700 km; 9,800 mi) at 10 knots (19 km/h; 12 mph). U-575 was fitted with five 53.3 cm (21 in) torpedo tubes (four fitted at the bow and one at the stern), fourteen torpedoes, one 8.8 cm (3.46 in) SK C/35 naval gun, 220 rounds, and a 2 cm (0.79 in) C/30 anti-aircraft gun. The boat had a complement of between forty-four and sixty.

== Service history ==
The submarine was laid down on 1 August 1940 at Blohm & Voss, Hamburg, as yard number 551. She was launched on 30 April 1941 and commissioned on 19 June under the command of Kapitänleutnant Günther Heydemann.

She served with the 7th U-boat Flotilla until her loss (from 1 September 1941 until 13 March 1944).

=== First patrol ===
U-575's first patrol was from Trondheim in Norway; she headed for the Atlantic Ocean via the gap between Iceland and the Faroe Islands. She swept an area southeast of Greenland and sank the Tuva on 2 October 1941. The ship's crew abandoned their vessel in a pair of lifeboats and two rafts, but had to leave one of their number who had been trapped underneath debris. The neutral US destroyer USS Winslow, escorting convoy ON 20, came to help Tuva. As Winslow reached the area, she closed in on U-575 and began the tracing with depth charges, but U-575 escaped without any damage.

The submarine was the target of an air attack on 7 October, but received minimal damage. She arrived at St. Nazaire in occupied France, on 9 October.

==== Statistics ====
- Days on sea: 32
- Overall distance travelled: 5,059.5 nmi
- Distance travelled surfaced: 4,776.70 nmi (94.4%)
- Distance travelled submerged: 282.8 nmi (5.6%)
- Most distance travelled in 24 hours surfaced: 292 nmi (on 08.10.1941)
- Most distance travelled in 24 hours submerged: 36.3 nmi (on 12.09.1941)
- Total diving time: 7,029 minutes; 117.15 hours; 4.88 days (15.3%)

=== Second patrol ===
Having left St. Nazaire on 9 November 1941, U-575 headed for the Newfoundland and Labrador coast.

On 1 December 1941 she encountered the American tanker Astral at 35°40´N/24°00´W (ca. grid square CF75-79). The tanker had departed Aruba in Venezuela, and sailed to Lissabon with a cargo of 78,200 barrels of benzine and kerosine. For many hours, U-575 hunted Astral so that she could come into a good firing position; after doing so, Captain Heydemann recognized the neutral US flag, and refrained from attacking the tanker.

On the return leg, when U-575 was looking to re-fuel at Vigo, Spain, she was depth charged. The damage was serious enough to prevent her entry into the Mediterranean; she was obliged to return to St. Nazaire, which she did on 17 December.

==== Statistics ====
- Days on sea: 39
- Overall distance travelled: 5,814 nmi
- Distance travelled surfaced: 5,508.80 nmi (94.8%)
- Distance travelled submerged: 305.2 nmi (5.2%)
- Most distance travelled in 24 hours surfaced: 354 nmi (on 30.11.1941)
- Most distance travelled in 24 hours submerged: 37 nmi (on 10.12.1941)
- Total diving time: 6,841 minutes; 114.02 hours; 4.75 days (12.2%)

=== Third patrol ===
For her third foray, U-575 left St. Nazaire on 14 January 1942. On the 25th, a lookout broke an arm in bad weather.

At the end of January, U-575 was involved with U-123 in trying, in the mid-ocean 'air-gap', to rendezvous with the Spreewald, a German blockade runner whose doctor might be able to treat one of U123's crew members who had been injured. On the 31st, U-123 met U-575, but there was no sign of the Spreewald. She had been sunk, but it was not then known by whom.

==== Statistics ====
- Days on sea: 44
- Overall distance travelled: 5,986 nmi
- Distance travelled surfaced: 5,750 nmi (96.1%)
- Distance travelled submerged: 236 nmi (3.9%)
- Most distance travelled in 24 hours surfaced: 210 nmi (on 27.01.1942)
- Most distance travelled in 24 hours submerged: 24 nmi (on 16.01.1942)
- Total diving time: 3,369 minutes; 56.15 hours; 2.34 days (5.3%)

=== Fourth patrol ===
U-575's only target on this patrol was the Robin Hood, which she sank about 300 nautical miles (560 km; 350 mi) southeast of Nantucket Island (off the eastern US coast).

Liliput, the emblem of U-575

==== Statistics ====
- Days on sea: 52
- Overall distance travelled: 7,129.5 nmi
- Distance travelled surfaced: 6,912 nmi (97%)
- Distance travelled submerged: 217.5 nmi (3%)
- Most distance travelled in 24 hours surfaced: 268 nmi (on 28.03.1942)
- Most distance travelled in 24 hours submerged: 37,5 nmi (on 26.03.1942)
- Total diving time: 5,622 minutes; 93.7 hours; 3.90 days (7.4%)

=== Fifth patrol ===
U-575 performed a steady stream of sinkings on her fifth sortie. The Norlandia was sunk on 4 July 1942 and Empire Explorer on the ninth. Additionally, she sunk two sailing ships (Comrade and Glacier) with gunfire on the 18th.

She also damaged San Gaspar off Manzilla, Trinidad on the 18th. It was assumed at that time that this ship had been sunk, but she was taken in tow by the tug HMS Roode Zee to Port of Spain, repaired, and returned to service in October 1943.

==== Statistics ====
- Days on sea: 59
- Overall distance travelled: 10,173 nmi
- Distance travelled surfaced 9,732.30 nmi (95.7%)
- Distance travelled submerged: 440.7 nmi (4.3%)
- Most distance travelled in 24 hours surfaced: 286.1 nmi (on 14.06.1942)
- Most distance travelled in 24 hours submerged: 57 nmi (on 06.08.1942)
- Total diving time: 9,866 minutes; 164.4 hours; 6.85 days (11.6%)

=== Sixth patrol ===
On the boat's sixth patrol, a man was lost overboard on 5 October 1942.

U-575 tallied another kill when she sank the troopship MV Abosso which was sailing unescorted about 700 nautical miles (1,300 km; 810 mi) northwest of the Azores. 362 people were killed. Abosso's top speed was only 14 knots (26 km/h; 16 mph) and therefore normally sailed only in convoys. One passenger, Dutch Navy submarine commander Lieutenant ter zee der 1e klasse H.C.J. Coumou had warned against this but the British authorities overruled him. On board were 162 crew, 20 DEMS gunners to defend the ship and 210 passengers. The passengers were 149 military, 44 internees and 17 civilians, including 10 women with children. The cargo was 3,000 tons of wool and mailbags. Among the military passengers were 44 newly trained pilots of the 23rd Service Flying Training School in Southern Rhodesia and 34 Dutch submariners on their way to crew the submarine Hr. Ms. Haai, which was then under construction. Haai had been laid down as HMS Varne for the Royal Navy but had been reallocated to the Dutch Navy. 30 of the submariners were killed on Abosso and the Dutch were unable to replace them. The British authorities therefore reallocated the submarine again, and she was launched as the Norwegian Navy HNoMS Ula.

==== Statistics ====
- Days on sea: 54
- Overall distance travelled: 7,363.4 nmi
- Distance travelled surfaced: 6,903.10 nmi (93.8%)
- Distance travelled submerged: 460.3 nmi (6.2%)
- Most distance travelled in 24 hours surfaced: 300 nmi (on 04.10.1942)
- Most distance travelled in 24 hours submerged: 53 nmi (on 23.09.1942)
- Total diving time: 7,587 minutes; 126.5 hours; 5.27 days (9.8%)

=== Seventh patrol ===
On U-575's seventh mission, she sank the US ship City of Flint from the convoy UGS 4 about 300 nmi (560 km; 350 mi) southeast of the Azores on 25 January 1943.

==== Statistics ====
Cover page of the Hamburger Illustrierte of 22.1.1944 – "Three and their gun", the silhouette on the gun is the City of Flint

- Days on sea: 64
- Overall distance travelled: 10,132.3 nmi
- Distance travelled surfaced: 9,692.70 nmi (95.7%)
- Distance travelled submerged: 439.6 nmi (4.3%)
- Most distance travelled in 24 hours surfaced: 294.8 nmi (on 09.01.1943)
- Most distance travelled in 24 hours submerged: 40.7 nmi (on 20.12.1942)
- Total diving time: 10,449 minutes; 174.2 hours; 7.26 days (10.8%)

=== Eight patrol ===
Her eighth sortie, which commenced on 22 April 1943 and finished on 11 June, was relatively uneventful.

==== Statistics ====
- Days on sea: 51
- Overall distance travelled: 8,028.7 nmi
- Distance travelled surfaced: 7,164.90 nmi (89.2%)
- Distance travelled submerged: 863.8 nmi (10.8%)
- Most distance travelled in 24 hours surfaced: 307 nmi (on 14.05.1943)
- Most distance travelled in 24 hours submerged: 53.3 nmi (on 26.04.1943)
- Total diving time: 17,217 minutes; 287 hours; 11.96 days (23.4%)

=== Ninth patrol ===
U-575 had a new Captain, Oberleutnant zur See Wolfgang Boehmer, since September 1943, in time for her ninth patrol.

The expedition was split into four parts; the first three were only a couple of days' duration. The fourth was longer and included an approach by a B-24 Liberator which turned away when engaged by the U-boat's anti-aircraft guns. Nevertheless, she crash-dived.

==== Statistics ====
- Days on sea: 63
- Overall distance travelled: 6,776.2 nmi
- Distance travelled surfaced: 5,432.80 nmi (80.2%)
- Distance travelled submerged: 1,343.4 nmi (19.8%)
- Most distance travelled in 24 hours surfaced: 263.1 nmi (on 16.11.1943)
- Most distance travelled in 24 hours submerged: 54 nmi (on 09.10.1943)
- Total diving time: 36,392 minutes; 606.5 hours; 25.27 days (36.1%)

=== Tenth patrol and loss ===
In memory at the sailing with German U-Boatmen 1944 on HMCS Prince Rupert

U-575 was fitted with a Snorkel. On this journey she was used as weather-boat. U-575 left St. Nazaire for the last time on 29 February 1944. After sinking HMS Asphodel northwest of Cape Finisterre on 10 March, the boat was hunted for 18 hours by convoy escorts, but escaped.

Her luck ran out on the 13th when she was sunk by the combined efforts of the Canadian frigate HMCS Prince Rupert, the American destroyer USS Hobson and destroyer escort USS Haverfield, a British Vickers Wellington of No. 172 Squadron RAF, two B-17 Flying Fortresses of 206 and 208 squadrons and a TBM Avenger from USS Bogue. Depth charges were used in the attack.

18 men died with U-575; there were 37 survivors.

=== Wolfpacks ===
U-575 took part in 18 wolfpacks, namely:

- Brandenburg (15 – 26 September 1941)
- Steuben (14 November – 2 December 1941)
- Endrass (12 – 17 June 1942)
- Tiger (26 – 27 September 1942)
- Luchs (27 September – 6 October 1942)
- Panther (6 – 16 October 1942)
- Puma (16 – 22 October 1942)
- Delphin (26 December 1942 – 14 February 1943)
- Amsel 1 (3 – 6 May 1943)
- Elbe (7 – 10 May 1943)
- Elbe 1 (10 – 14 May 1943)
- Mosel (19 – 24 May 1943)
- Siegfried (22 – 27 October 1943)
- Siegfried 3 (27 – 30 October 1943)
- Jahn (30 October – 2 November 1943)
- Tirpitz 3 (2 – 8 November 1943)
- Eisenhart 4 (9 – 15 November 1943)
- Preussen (2 – 13 March 1944)

== Summary of raiding history ==
U-575 under bombardment

Date	Ship Name	Nationality	Tonnage (Note: Merchant ship tonnages are in gross register tons. Military vessels are listed by tons displacement.)	Fate
2 October 1941	Tuva	Netherlands	4,652	Sunk
16 April 1942	Robin Hood	United States	6,887	Sunk
4 July 1942	Norlandia	United Kingdom	2,689	Sunk
9 July 1942	Empire Explorer	United Kingdom	5,345	Sunk
18 July 1942	Comrade	United Kingdom	69	Sunk
18 July 1942	Glacier	United Kingdom	75	Sunk
18 July 1942	San Gaspar	United Kingdom	12,910	Damaged
29 October 1942	Abosso	United Kingdom	11,330	Sunk
25 January 1943	City of Flint	United States	4,963	Sunk
10 March 1944	HMS Asphodel	Royal Navy	1,015	Sunk

== Bibliography ==
- Busch, Rainer; Röll, Hans-Joachim (1999). German U-boat commanders of World War II : a biographical dictionary. Translated by Brooks, Geoffrey. London, Annapolis, Md: Greenhill Books, Naval Institute Press. ISBN 1-55750-186-6.
- Busch, Rainer; Röll, Hans-Joachim (1999). Der U-Boot-Krieg, 1939-1945: Deutsche U-Boot-Verluste von September 1939 bis Mai 1945 [German U-boat losses from September 1939 to May 1945] (in German). Vol. IV. Hamburg, Berlin, Bonn: Mittler. ISBN 3-8132-0514-2.
- Gröner, Eric; Jung, Dieter; Maass, Martin (1991). German Warships 1815-1945: U-boats and Mine Warfare Vessels. Vol. 2. Translated by Thomas, Keith; Magowan, Rachel. London: Conway Maritime Press. ISBN 0-85177-593-4.
- Kemp, Paul (1997). U-boats destroyed. London: Arms & Armour. ISBN 1-85409-515-3.
