= HNoMS Ula (1943) =

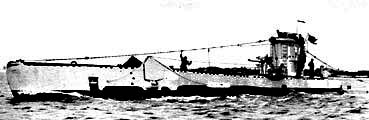
- HNoMS Ula

History

United Kingdom
- Name: HMS Varne
- Builder: Vickers-Armstrongs, Barrow-in-Furness
- Laid down: 29 April 1942
- Launched: 22 January 1943
- Out of service: April 1943 transferred to Royal Norwegian Navy
- Badge

Norway
- Name: HNoMS Ula
- Acquired: April 1943 transferred to Royal Norwegian Navy
- Commissioned: 3 April 1943
- Fate: Scrapped, 1965 at Hamburg

General characteristics
- Class & type: U-class submarine
- Displacement: Surfaced : 540 long tons (549 t) standard; 639 long tons (649 t) full load; Submerged : 740 long tons (752 t)
- Length: 60 m (196 ft 10 in)
- Beam: 4.9 m (16 ft 1 in)
- Draught: 4.62 m (15 ft 2 in)
- Propulsion: Diesel-electric; 2 × Paxman-Ricardo diesel engines, 615 hp (459 kW); Electric motors, 825 hp (615 kW); 2 shafts
- Speed: 11.25 knots (20.84 km/h; 12.95 mph) surfaced; 9 knots (17 km/h; 10 mph) submerged
- Complement: 33
- Armament: 6 × 21 in (533 mm) bow torpedo tubes (4 internal, 2 external); 8–10 torpedoes; 1 × 3 in (76 mm) gun; 3 × AA machine guns

HNoMS Ula, previously HMS Varne, a British-built U-class submarine, and a member of the third group of that class to be built. She never actually served under the name Varne, being transferred before commissioning to the exiled Royal Norwegian Navy as HNoMS Ula (S300). In 1944 she sank a German U-boat during one of her patrols off Norway. She remained in Norwegian service and was scrapped in 1965.

== Service history ==
Originally built for Royal Navy as Varne, it was planned that the Royal Dutch Navy should man her and name her Haai. The Dutch crew (mainly 34 from the decommissioned submarines KIX, KX and KXII) needed to be brought to the UK from Sydney via Cape Town. Their ship from Cape Town was the merchant vessel Abosso, which was unescorted and was attacked and sunk in the Atlantic, 48.30N 28.50W, by the German U Boat Type VIIc U-575 on the night of 29 October 1942.

Varne was transferred to the Royal Norwegian Navy as HNoMS Ula (P66) in 1943, remaining there for the remainder of her career. She carried out 14 patrols during World War II, operating as part of the 'Norwegian Section' of the 9th Submarine Flotilla at Dundee. On 19 April 1944, under CO Lt Valvatne RNoN, 1 kilometre (0.62 mi) south east of Løten on the western Boknafjorden, near Stavanger, Norway, the submarine fired a salvo of four torpedoes. The target was the German Type VIIc U-boat U-974 at about 1,200 metres (1,300 yd) range. One torpedo hit its target just behind the conning tower and the U-boat was blown in two and sunk, though eight crew survived.

This was the most notable of Ula's victims during her 14 patrols. She sank several other targets, mostly merchant ships, during her war service, all of which was spent on the Norwegian patrol.

Ula was the Allied submarine which sunk the most enemy tonnage in the Atlantic in the Second World War.

Ula continued in Norwegian service until 1965, when she was broken up in Hamburg.
