= Wilhelm Genazino =

German journalist and author

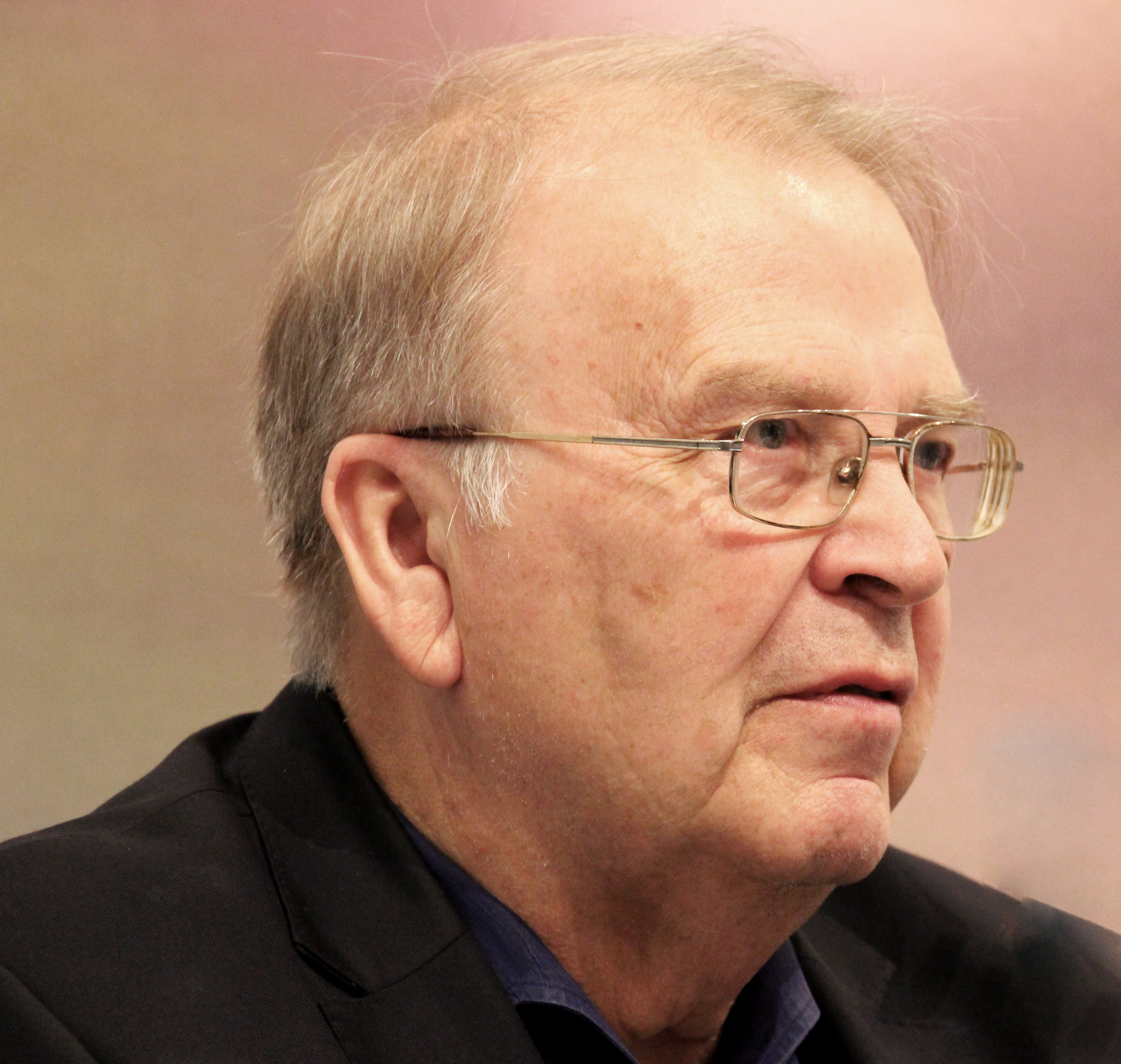
- Genazino in 2016 at the Frankfurt Book Fair
- Born: 22 January 1943; Mannheim, Germany
- Died: 12 December 2018 (aged 75); Frankfurt, Germany
- Education: Johann Wolfgang Goethe University
- Occupations: Journalist; Writer
- Organizations: pardon
- Awards: Georg Büchner Prize; Kleist Prize; Kassel Literary Prize

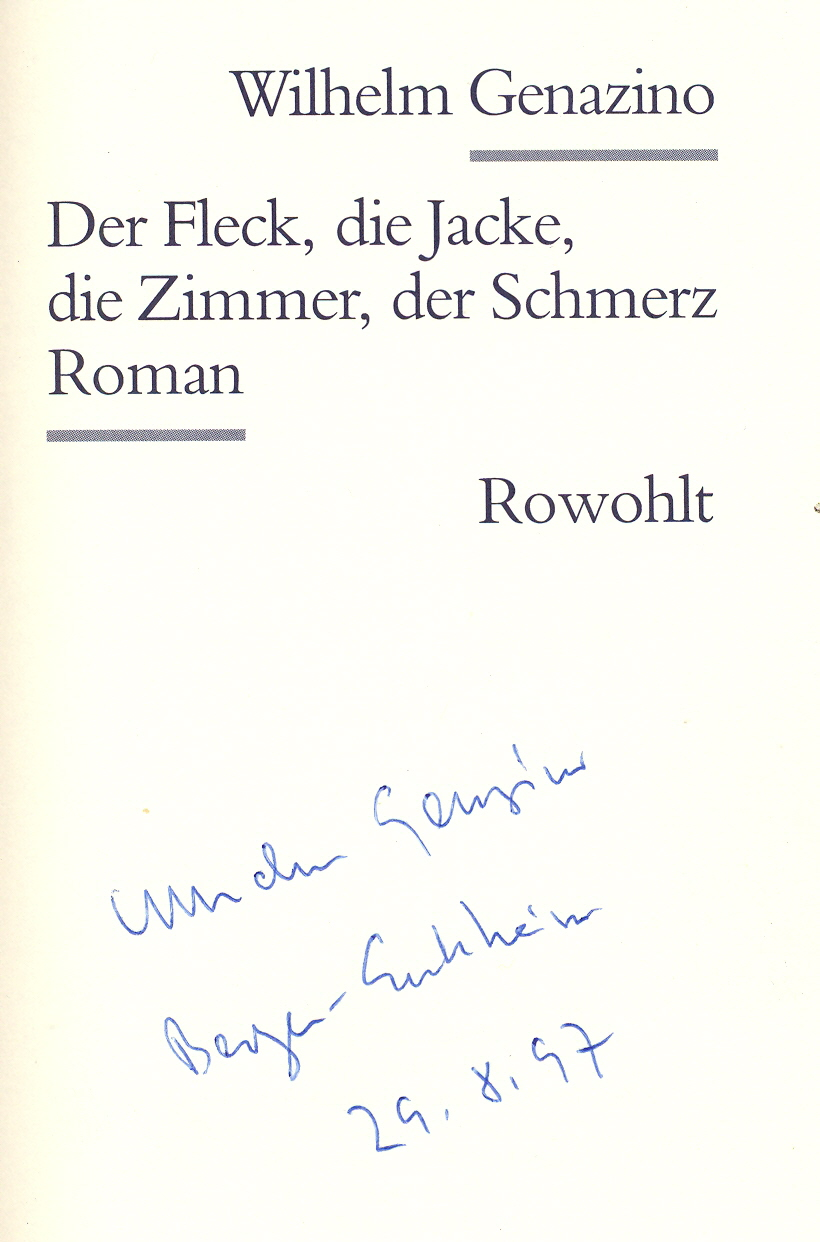
Signature on a book cover

Wilhelm Genazino (22 January 1943 – 12 December 2018) was a German journalist and author. He worked first as a journalist for the satirical magazine pardon and for Lesezeichen. From the early 1970s, he was a freelance writer who became known for a trilogy of novels, Abschaffel-Trilogie, completed in 1979. It was followed by more novels and two plays. Among his many awards is the prestigious Georg Büchner Prize.

== Career ==
Born in Mannheim, Genazino studied German, philosophy and sociology at the Johann Wolfgang Goethe University in Frankfurt am Main. He worked as a journalist until 1965. During this time, he worked, for the satirical magazine pardon and co-edited the magazine Lesezeichen. Beginning in 1970 he worked as a freelance author. In 1977 he achieved a breakthrough as a serious writer with his trilogy Abschaffel. In 1990 he became a member of the Academy for Language and Poetry in Darmstadt. After living in Heidelberg for a long time, Genazino moved to Frankfurt in 2004. That same year he was awarded the Georg Büchner Prize, the most prestigious award for German literature.

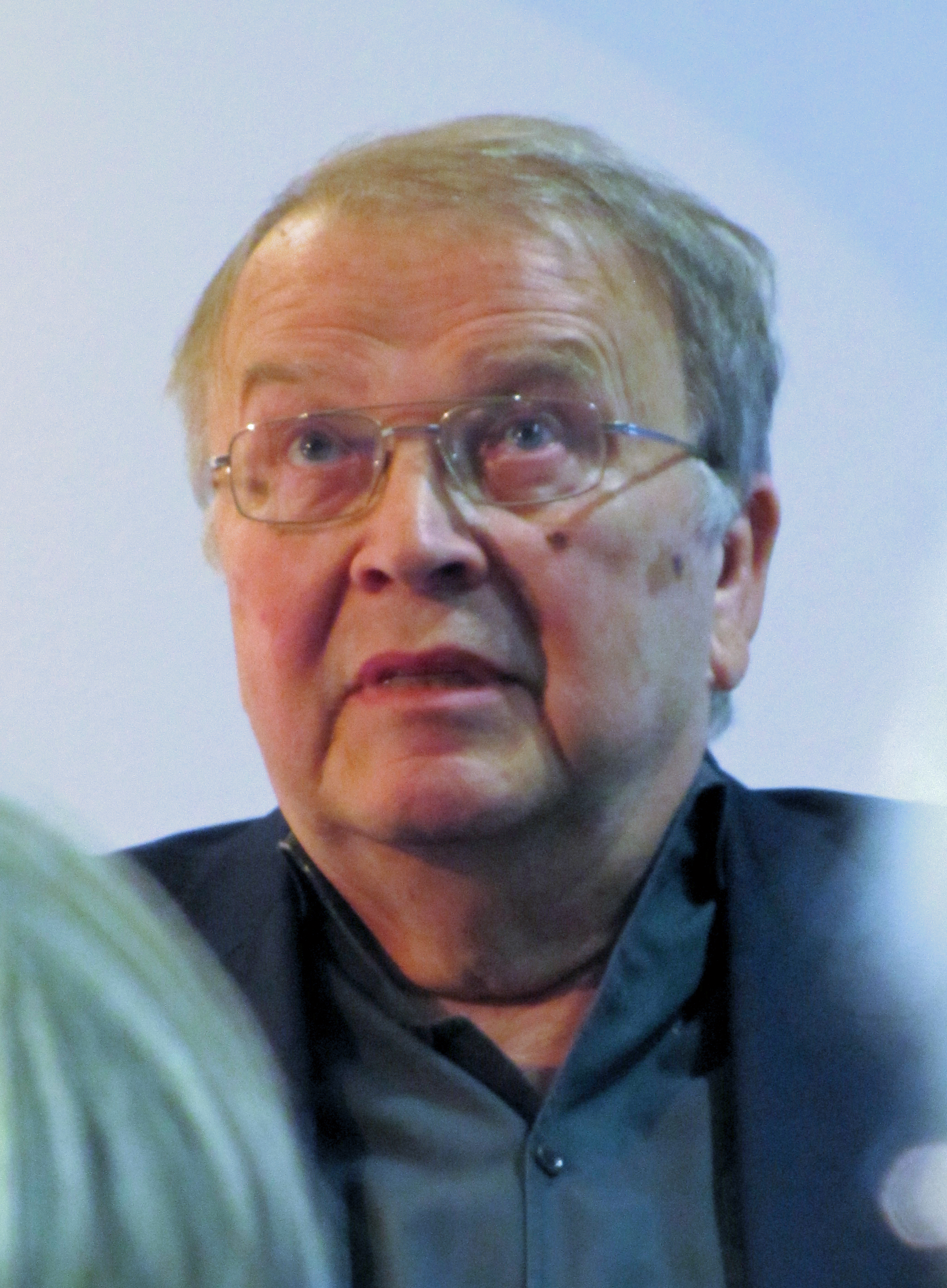
Genazino in 2013

Genazino died on 12 December 2018 after a short illness at the age of 75.

== Works ==
=== Books ===
- Laslinstrasse, 1965
- Abschaffel-Trilogie:
  - Abschaffel, 1977
  - Die Vernichtung der Sorgen, 1978
  - Falsche Jahre, 1979
- Der Fleck, die Jacke, die Zimmer, der Schmerz, 1989 (The Stain, the Jacket, the Rooms, the Pain)
- Die Liebe zur Einfalt Reinbek bei Hamburg 1990
- Die Obdachlosigkeit der Fische. Reinbek bei Hamburg 1994
- Die Kassiererinnen, 1998 (The [female] cashiers)
- Ein Regenschirm für diesen Tag, 2001 (An umbrella for this day, English title : The shoe tester of Frankfurt)
- Eine Frau, eine Wohnung, ein Roman, 2003 (A woman, a flat, a novel)
- Der gedehnte Blick, 2004 (The extended gaze)
- Die Liebesblödigkeit, 2005 (The foolishness of love) ISBN 978-3-446-20595-6
- Mittelmäßiges Heimweh, Munich 2007 (Mediocre homesickness) ISBN 978-3-446-20818-6
- Das Glück in glücksfernen Zeiten, Munich 2009 ISBN 978-3-446-23265-5
- Wenn wir Tiere wären, 2011 (If we were animals), ISBN 978-3-446-23738-4
- Bei Regen im Saal, Hanser, Munich 2014, ISBN 978-3-446-24596-9
- Außer uns spricht niemand über uns. Hanser, Munich 2016, ISBN 978-3-446-25273-8
- Kein Geld, keine Uhr, keine Mütze. Hanser, Munich 2018, ISBN 978-3-446-25810-5

=== Play ===
- Lieber Gott mach mich blind, premiered Staatstheater Darmstadt in October 2005, Frankfurt 2003, Munich 2006 and Der Hausschrat. Munich 2006, Mülheim 2007, Theaterstücke

=== In translation ===
- Ein Regenschirm für diesen Tag was translated to English by Philip Boehm as The Shoe Tester of Frankfurt, New York: New Directions, 2006, and to Chinese, French, Italian, Greek and Lithuanian.
- Eine Frau, eine Wohnung, ein Roman was translated into French, Spanish, Polish, Chinese, and Hebrew.

Translations of works by Genazino have also been published in Greek, Latvian and Russian.

== Honours ==
- Bremer Literaturpreis, 1990
- Solothurner Literaturpreis, 1995
- Literaturpreis der Bayerischen Akademie der schönen Künste, 1998
- Kranichsteiner Literaturpreis, 2001
- Georg Büchner Prize, 2004
- Kleist Prize, 2007
- Kassel Literary Prize for Grotesque Humor, 2013
- Goethe Plaque of the City of Frankfurt, 2014

== Literature ==
- Heinz Ludwig Arnold (ed.): Wilhelm Genazino. Edition Text + Kritik, München 2004, ISBN 3-88377-755-2.
- Andrea Bartl, Friedhelm Marx (ed.): Verstehensanfänge. Das literarische Werk Wilhelm Genazinos. Wallstein, Göttingen 2011 (Poiesis. Standpunkte zur Gegenwartsliteratur 7), ISBN 978-3-8353-0845-9.
- Jonas Fansa: Unterwegs im Monolog. Poetologische Konzeptionen in der Prosa Wilhelm Genazinos. Königshausen & Neumann, Würzburg 2008, ISBN 3-8260-3744-8.
- Alexander Fischer: Wider das System: Der gesellschaftliche Aussteiger in Genazinos 'Ein Regenschirm für diesen Tag' und literarische Verwandte bei Kleist und Kafka. UBP, Bamberg 2012, ISBN 978-3-86309-086-9.
- Alexander Fischer: Im existentiellen Zwiespalt. Wilhelm Genazinos Ein Regenschirm für diesen Tag vor dem Hintergrund existenzphilosophischer Konzepte. In: Bartl, Andrea/Klinge, Annika (ed.): Transitkunst. Studien zur Literatur 1890-2010. UBP, Bamberg 2012
- Winfried Giesen (ed.): Wilhelm Genazino – "Die Belebung der toten Winkel", Begleitheft zur Ausstellung 11. Januar – 25. Februar 2006, Universitätsbibliothek Frankfurt am Main. Frankfurt 2006, ISBN 3-88131-100-9.
- Aktualisiertes Verzeichnis der unselbstständig erschienenen Primärliteratur Wilhelm Genazinos from 1961 to 2014, collected by Winfried Giesen.
- Wilhelm Genazino – Sekundärliteratur from 1963 to 2014 collected by Winfried Giesen.
- Anja Hirsch: Schwebeglück der Literatur. Der Erzähler Wilhelm Genazino. Synchron Wissenschaftsverlag der Autoren, Heidelberg 2006, ISBN 3-935025-88-2
- Joachim Jacob: Schönheit, Literatur und Lebenskunst. Überlegungen zu Peter Handkes „Versuch über den geglückten Tag“ und Wilhelm Genazinos "Eine Frau, eine Wohnung, ein Roman" In: Susanne Krepold, Christian Krepold (ed.): Schön und gut? Studien zu Ethik und Ästhetik in der Literatur. Königshausen & Neumann, Würzburg 2008, pp. 185–199.
- Ulrich Klappstein: Ein Flaneur für diesen Tag. Eine lexikalische Annäherung an den Schriftsteller Wilhelm Genazino In: Hartmut Fischer (ed.): Flanieren - Gehen - Wandern. Northeim 2011.
- Christian Krepold: "... als sei das Ende des Menschen die einzige ordentliche Verrichtung". Altern, Melancholie und Komik bei Wilhelm Genazino und Italo Svevo. In: Andrea Bartl (ed.): Transitträume. Beiträge zur deutschsprachigen Gegenwartsliteratur. Wißner, Augsburg 2009 (Germanistik und Gegenwartsliteratur 4), pp. 55–101.
- Susanne Krepold, Christian Krepold: Literarische Selbstreflexion durch Lektüre. Wilhelm Genazino als Leser von Marguerite Duras. In: Steffen Buch, Álvaro Ceballos, Christian Gerth (ed.): Selbstreflexivität. 23. Forum Junge Romanistik (Göttingen, 30. Mai–2. Juni 2007). Romanistischer Verlag, Bonn 2008, pp. 107–124.
- Nils Lehnert: Wilhelm Genazinos Romanfiguren. Erzähltheoretische und (literatur-)psychologische Zugriffe auf Handlungsmotivation und Eindruckssteuerung. De Gruyter, Berlin 2018 (Deutsche Literatur. Studien und Quellen 30), ISBN 978-3-11-062535-6.
