= Taxis of London =

United Kingdom legislation

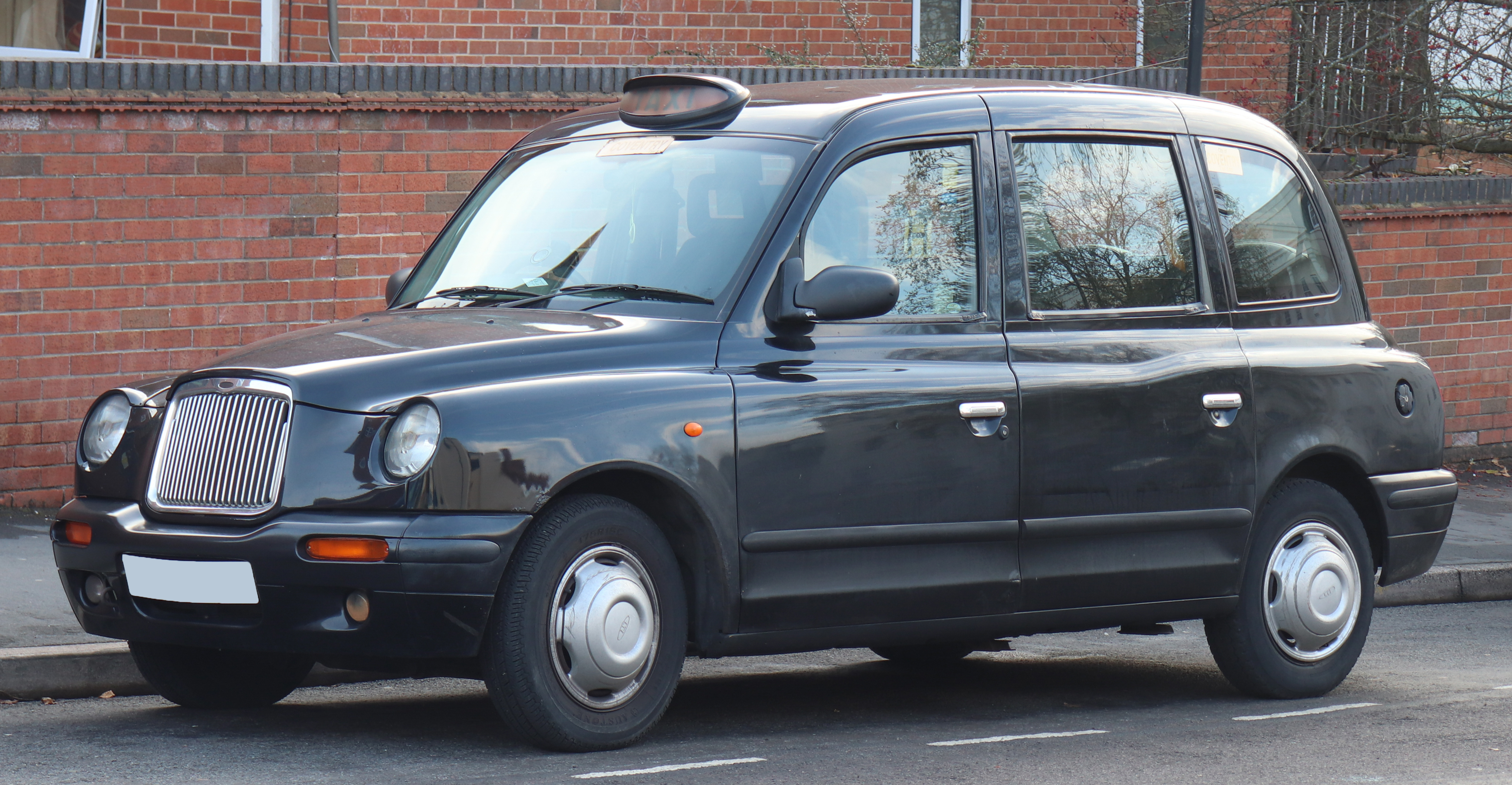
A LTI TX2 cab

Taxis are regulated throughout the United Kingdom, but the regulation of taxicabs in London is especially rigorous with regard to mechanical integrity and driver knowledge.

A hackney, or hackney carriage, (also called a cab, black cab, hack, or taxi) is a carriage or car for hire. A hackney of a more expensive or high class was called a remise. A symbol of London and Britain, the black taxi is a common sight on the streets of London. The hackney carriages carry roof signs reading TAXI that are illuminated to indicate their availability for passengers.

== History ==
=== Horse-drawn era ===
In the 1580s, the widespread use of private coaches by the English aristocracy began to be seen. Within fifty years, hackney coaches were regularly seen on the streets of London. In the 1620s there was a proliferation of coaches for hire in London, endangering pedestrians in the narrow streets. In 1635, an Order in Council was issued limiting the number allowed. In 1637, a system for licensing hackney coachmen was established, overseen by the Master of the Horse.

In 1636, the number of carriages was set at 50, an early example of taxicab regulation. In the same year, the owner of four hackney carriages established the first taxicab stand in The Strand. After 1662 hackneys were regulated by the Commissioners of Scotland Yard.

In the early 19th century cabriolets (cabs for short) replaced the heavier and more cumbersome hackney carriages. Battery-operated taxis appeared briefly at the end of the 19th century. In 1903, the modern taxicab service took off with the appearance of petrol-powered taxis. In 1907, meters were introduced to calculate the fare and were set at 8d (8 pence) for the first mile.

Today, taxicab service in London is regulated by Transport for London's strict Conditions of Fitness, mandating size, turning radius, age, and emissions, resulting in unique vehicles built primarily for the London market such as the LEVC and the Mercedes Vito seen today.

Hackney Coaches, etc. Act 1694
- Act of Parliament
- Parliament of England
- Long title: An Act for the licensing and regulating Hackney-Coaches and Stage-Coaches.
- Citation: 5 & 6 Will. & Mar. c. 22
- Territorial extent: England and Wales

Dates
- Royal assent: 25 April 1694
- Commencement: 10 May 1694 (Note: Section 1.)
- Expired: 10 May 1715
- Repealed: 15 July 1867
Other legislation
| Repealed by | Statute Law Revision Act 1867 |

Status: Repealed

Text of statute as originally enacted

Hackney Chairs Act 1712
- Act of Parliament
- Parliament of Great Britain
- Long title: An Act for explaining the Acts for licensing Hackney Chairs.
- Citation: 12 Ann. c. 15 (Note: This is the citation in The Statutes of the Realm.); 12 Ann. St. 1. c. 14 (Note: This is the citation in The Statutes at Large.)
- Territorial extent: Great Britain

Dates
- Royal assent: 16 July 1713
- Commencement: 9 April 1713 (Note: Start of session)
- Repealed: 5 January 1832
Other legislation
| Amends | Stamps Act 1710 |
| Amended by | Continuance of Laws, etc. Act 1742 |
| Repealed by | London Hackney Carriage Act 1831 |

Status: Repealed

Text of statute as originally enacted

Hackney Coaches, etc. Act 1715
- Act of Parliament
- Parliament of Great Britain
- Long title: An Act for the better regulating Hackney Coaches, Carts, Drays, Cars, and Waggons, within the Cities of London and Westminster, and the Weekly Bills of Mortality; and for preventing Mischiefs occasioned by the Drivers riding upon such Carts, Drays, Cars, and Waggons.
- Citation: 1 Geo. 1. St. 2. c. 57
- Territorial extent: Great Britain

Dates
- Royal assent: 26 June 1716
- Commencement: 17 March 1715
- Repealed: 15 July 1867
Other legislation
| Amended by | Continuance of Laws, etc. Act 1742 |
| Repealed by | Statute Law Revision Act 1867 |
| Relates to | Stamps (No. 2) Act 1710 |

Status: Repealed

Text of statute as originally enacted

Hackney Coaches Act 1771
- Act of Parliament
- Parliament of Great Britain
- Long title: An Act for licensing an additional Number of Hackney Coaches, and applying the Monies arising thereby.
- Citation: 11 Geo. 3. c. 24
- Territorial extent: Great Britain

Dates
- Royal assent: 12 April 1771
- Commencement: 13 November 1770
- Repealed: 5 January 1832
Other legislation
| Repealed by | London Hackney Carriage Act 1831] |
| Relates to | Stamps (No. 2) Act 1710; Hackney Coachmen Act 1771 |

Status: Repealed

Text of statute as originally enacted

Hackney Coachmen Act 1771
- Act of Parliament
- Parliament of Great Britain
- Long title: An Act for punishing Offences committed by Hackney Coachmen and Chairmen, within certain Districts and Places therein mentioned, and for renewing the Registry of Carts and Carriages.
- Citation: 11 Geo. 3. c. 28
- Territorial extent: Great Britain

Dates
- Royal assent: 29 April 1771
- Commencement: 24 June 1771
- Repealed: 5 January 1832
Other legislation
| Repealed by | London Hackney Carriage Act 1831] |
| Relates to | Stamps (No. 2) Act 1710; Hackney Coaches Act 1771 |

Status: Repealed

Text of statute as originally enacted

Hackney Coaches Act 1772
- Act of Parliament
- Parliament of Great Britain
- Long title: An Act to explain and amend an Act, made in the Seventh Year of the Reign of His present Majesty, intituled, "An Act for altering the Stamp Duties upon Policies of Assurances; and for reducing the Allowance to be made in respect of the Prompt Payment of the Stamp Duties on Licences for retailing Beer, Ale, and other exciseable Liquors; and for explaining and amending several Acts of Parliament relating to Hackney Coaches and Chairs;" so far as the same relates to Hackney Coaches.
- Citation: 12 Geo. 3. c. 49
- Territorial extent: Great Britain

Dates
- Royal assent: 3 June 1772
- Commencement: 21 January 1772
- Repealed: 5 January 1832
Other legislation
| Amends | Stamps (No. 2) Act 1766 |
| Repealed by | London Hackney Carriage Act 1831 |
| Relates to | Hackney Coaches Act 1804 |

Status: Repealed

Text of statute as originally enacted

Hackney Coaches Act 1784
- Act of Parliament
- Parliament of Great Britain
- Long title: An Act for laying an additional Duty on Hackney Coaches, and for explaining and amending several Acts of Parliament relating to Hackney Coaches.
- Citation: 24 Geo. 3. Sess. 2. c. 27
- Territorial extent: Great Britain

Dates
- Royal assent: 13 August 1784
- Commencement: 4 September 1784
- Repealed: 5 January 1832
Other legislation
| Amended by | Hackney Coaches Act 1786 |
| Repealed by | London Hackney Carriage Act 1831 |

Status: Repealed

Text of statute as originally enacted

Hackney Coaches Act 1786
- Act of Parliament
- Parliament of Great Britain
- Long title: An Act for explaining and amending an Act made in the Twenty-fourth Year of the Reign of His present Majesty, intituled, "An Act for laying an additional Duty on Hackney Coaches, and for explaining and amending several Acts of Parliament relating to Hackney Coaches."
- Citation: 26 Geo. 3. c. 72
- Territorial extent: Great Britain

Dates
- Royal assent: 4 July 1786
- Commencement: 1 August 1786
- Repealed: 5 January 1832
Other legislation
| Amends | Hackney Coaches Act 1784 |
| Amended by | London Hackney Carriage Act 1800 |
| Repealed by | London Hackney Carriage Act 1831 |

Status: Repealed

Text of statute as originally enacted

Hackney Coaches Act 1792
- Act of Parliament
- Parliament of Great Britain
- Long title: An Act to explain and amend so much of an Act made in the Seventh Year of the Reign of His present Majesty, as relates to Hackney Coaches and Chairs.
- Citation: 32 Geo. 3. c. 47
- Territorial extent: Great Britain

Dates
- Royal assent: 11 June 1792
- Commencement: 5 July 1792
- Repealed: 5 January 1832
Other legislation
| Amends | Highways (No. 2) Act 1766 |
| Repealed by | London Hackney Carriage Act 1831 |

Status: Repealed

Text of statute as originally enacted

London Hackney Carriage Act 1800
- Act of Parliament
- Parliament of Great Britain
- Long title: An Act for repealing the Rates and Fares taken by Licensed Hackney Coachmen, and for establishing other Rates and Fares in lieu thereof; and for explaining and amending several Laws relating to Hackney Coaches and Chairs.
- Citation: 39 & 40 Geo. 3. c. 47
- Territorial extent: Great Britain

Dates
- Royal assent: 30 May 1800
- Commencement: 30 May 1800
- Repealed: 5 January 1832
Other legislation
| Amends | Hackney Coaches Act 1786 |
| Repealed by | London Hackney Carriage Act 1831 |

Status: Repealed

Text of statute as originally enacted

Hackney Coaches Act 1804
- Act of Parliament
- Parliament of the United Kingdom
- Long title: An act for explaining and amending several Acts relating to Hackney Coaches employed as Stage Coaches, and for indemnifying the Owners of Hackney Coaches who have omitted to take out Licences, pursuant to an Act made in the twenty-fifth Year of his present Majesty.
- Citation: 44 Geo. 3. c. 88
- Territorial extent: United Kingdom

Dates
- Royal assent: 20 July 1804
- Commencement: 20 July 1804
- Repealed: 5 January 1832
Other legislation
| Amended by | Dublin Carriage Act 1853 |
| Repealed by | London Hackney Carriage Act 1831 |
| Relates to | Hackney Coaches Act 1772; Duties on Post Horses, etc. Act 1785; Stage Coach Duties Act 1796 |

Status: Repealed

Text of statute as originally enacted

London Hackney Carriages Act 1843 (Note: The citation of this act by this short title was authorised by section 1 of, and the first schedule to, the Short Titles Act 1896. Due to the repeal of those provisions it is now authorised by section 19(2) of the Interpretation Act 1978.)
- Act of Parliament
- Parliament of the United Kingdom
- Long title: An Act for regulating Hackney and Stage Carriages in and near London.
- Citation: 6 & 7 Vict. c. 86
- Territorial extent: United Kingdom

Dates
- Royal assent: 22 August 1843
- Commencement: 22 August 1843 (Note: The Acts of Parliament (Commencement) Act 1793.)
Other legislation
| Repeals/revokes | Hackney Carriages, Metropolis Act 1838 |
| Amended by | Revenue Act 1869; Metropolitan Public Carriage Act 1869; Statute Law Revision Act 1874 (No. 2); Public Authorities Protection Act 1893; Road Traffic Act 1930; London Government Act 1963; Statute Law (Repeals) Act 1973; Statute Law (Repeals) Act 1976; Statute Law (Repeals) Act 1989; Statute Law (Repeals) Act 1993; Statute Law (Repeals) Act 2004 |
| Relates to | London Hackney Carriages Act 1850 |

Status: Amended

Text of statute as originally enacted

Revised text of statute as amended

London Hackney Carriages Act 1850
- Act of Parliament
- Parliament of the United Kingdom
- Long title: An Act for consolidating the Office of the Registrar of Metropolitan Public Carriages with the Office of Commissioners of Police of the Metropolis, and making other Provisions in regard to the consolidated Offices.
- Citation: 13 & 14 Vict. c. 86
- Territorial extent: United Kingdom

Dates
- Royal assent: 25 March 1850
- Commencement: 25 March 1850
Other legislation
| Amended by | Statute Law Revision Act 1875; Statute Law (Repeals) Act 1981; Statute Law Revision Act 1891; Statute Law Revision Act 1892; Access to Justice Act 1999; Greater London Authority Act 1999 |

Status: Amended

Text of statute as originally enacted

Revised text of statute as amended

London Hackney Carriages Act 1853
- Act of Parliament
- Parliament of the United Kingdom
- Long title: An Act for the better Regulation of Metropolitan Stage and Hackney Carriages, and for prohibiting the Use of advertising Vehicles.
- Citation: 16 & 17 Vict. c. 33
- Territorial extent: United Kingdom

Dates
- Royal assent: 28 June 1853
- Commencement: 28 June 1853
Other legislation
| Amended by | Statute Law Revision Act 1892; Statute Law (Repeals) Act 1973; Statute Law (Repeals) Act 1976; Statute Law (Repeals) Act 1993 |

Status: Amended

Text of statute as originally enacted

Revised text of statute as amended

London Hackney Carriage (No. 2) Act 1853
- Act of Parliament
- Parliament of the United Kingdom
- Long title: An Act to make Provision as to the Charge for the Hire of Hackney Carriages in certain Cases. (Note: Original title was "An Act to reduce the Duties payable in respect of Hackney Carriages used in the Metropolis, and to amend the Laws relating to the granting of Licenses and Payment of Duties in respect of Metropolitan Stage and Hackney Carriages, and to make Provision as to the Charge for the Hire of Hackney Carriages in certain Cases")
- Citation: 16 & 17 Vict. c. 127
- Territorial extent: United Kingdom

Dates
- Royal assent: 20 August 1853
- Commencement: 20 August 1853
Other legislation
| Amended by | Statute Law Revision Act 1892; Revenue Act 1869; Statute Law (Repeals) Act 1973; Statute Law (Repeals) Act 1976 |

Status: Amended

Text of statute as originally enacted

Revised text of statute as amended

Metropolitan Public Carriage Act 1869
- Act of Parliament
- Parliament of the United Kingdom
- Long title: An Act for amending the Law relating to Hackney and Stage Carriages within the Metropolitan Police District.
- Citation: 32 & 33 Vict. c. 115
- Territorial extent: United Kingdom

Dates
- Royal assent: 11 August 1869
- Commencement: 11 August 1869
Other legislation
| Amended by | Statute Law Revision (No. 2) Act 1893; Road Transport Lighting Act 1927; Statute Law Revision Act 1966; Criminal Justice Act 1967; London Cab Act 1968; Statute Law (Repeals) Act 1976; Statute Law (Repeals) Act 1989; Transport and Works Act 1992; Greater London Authority Act 1999; Immigration Act 2016 |

Status: Amended

Text of statute as originally enacted

Revised text of statute as amended

London Cab Act 1896
- Act of Parliament
- Parliament of the United Kingdom
- Long title: An Act to amend the law relating to cabs in London.
- Citation: 59 and 60 Vict. c. 27
- Territorial extent: United Kingdom

Dates
- Royal assent: 7 August 1896
- Commencement: 7 August 1896
Other legislation
| Amended by | Criminal Justice Act 1982; Statute Law Revision Act 1950 |

Status: Amended

Text of statute as originally enacted

Revised text of statute as amended

London Cab and Stage Carriage Act 1907
- Act of Parliament
- Parliament of the United Kingdom
- Long title: An Act to amend the law relating to cabs and stage carriages in London.
- Citation: 55 Edw. 7 c. 55
- Territorial extent: United Kingdom

Dates
- Royal assent: 28 August 1907
- Commencement: 28 August 1907
Other legislation
| Amended by | Criminal Justice Act 1982; Statute Law Revision Act 1950 |

Status: Amended

Text of statute as originally enacted

Revised text of statute as amended

London Cab Act 1968 (Note: Section 5(1).)
- Act of Parliament
- Parliament of the United Kingdom
- Long title: An Act to extend the power of the Secretary of State to prescribe fares in respect of journeys by cab within the metropolitan police district and the City of London; to make provision for extending the length of such journeys which the driver of a cab is obliged by law to undertake; to relax restrictions on the parking of cabs; to prohibit the display on certain vehicles in that district or the City of London of signs or notices containing the word " taxi" or " cab " and signs or notices of certain other descriptions; and to restrict the issue, in connection with certain vehicles, of advertisements containing either of those words.
- Citation: 1968 c. 7
- Territorial extent: United Kingdom

Dates
- Royal assent: 15 February 1968
- Commencement: 15 February 1968
Other legislation
| Amends | London Hackney Carriage Act 1831; Metropolitan Public Carriage Act 1869 |
| Amended by | London Cab Act 1973; Road Traffics Regulation Act 1984; London Regional Transport Act 1984; Private Hire Vehicles (London) Act 1998; Greater London Authority Act 1999; Transport for London (Consequential Provisions) Order 2003; Statute Law (Repeals) Act 2004 |

Status: Amended

Text of statute as originally enacted

Revised text of statute as amended

London Cab Act 1973 (Note: Section 2.)
- Act of Parliament
- Parliament of the United Kingdom
- Long title: An Act to amend the London Cab Act 1968.
- Citation: 1973 c. c. 20
- Territorial extent: United Kingdom

Dates
- Royal assent: 23 May 1973
- Commencement: 23 May 1973
- Repealed: 8 June 2004 (Note: The Private Hire Vehicles (London) Act 1998 (Commencement No. 3) Order 2004 (SI 2004/241).)
Other legislation
| Amends | London Cab Act 1968 |
| Repealed by | Private Hire Vehicles (London) Act 1998 |

Status: Repealed

Text of statute as originally enacted

Revised text of statute as amended

"An Ordinance for the Regulation of Hackney-Coachmen in London and the places adjacent" was approved by Parliament in 1654, to remedy what it described as the "many Inconveniences [that] do daily arise by reason of the late increase and great irregularity of Hackney Coaches and Hackney Coachmen in London, Westminster and the places thereabouts". The first hackney-carriage licences date from a 1662 act of Parliament, the London and Westminster Streets Act 1662 (14 Cha. 2. c. 2) establishing the Commissioners of Scotland Yard to regulate them. Licences applied literally to horse-drawn carriages, later modernised as hansom cabs (1834), that operated as vehicles for hire. The 1662 act limited the licences to 400; when it expired in 1679, extra licences were created until the Hackney Coaches, etc. Act 1694 (5 & 6 Will. & Mar. c. 22) imposed a limit of 700. The limit was increased to 800 in 1715, 1,000 in 1770 and 1,100 in 1802, before being abolished in 1832. The 1694 act established the Hackney Coach Commissioners to oversee the regulation of fares, licences and other matters; in 1831 their work was taken over by the Stamp Office and in 1869 responsibility for licensing was passed on to the Metropolitan Police. In the 18th and 19th centuries, private carriages were commonly sold off for use as hackney carriages, often displaying painted-over traces of the previous owner's coat of arms on the doors.

There was a distinction between a general hackney carriage and a hackney coach, which was specifically a hireable vehicle with four wheels, two horses and six seats: four on the inside for the passengers and two on the outside (one for a servant and the other for the driver, who was popularly termed the Jarvey (also spelled jarvie)). For many years only coaches, to this specification, could be licensed for hire; but in 1814 the licensing of up to 200 hackney chariots was permitted, which carried a maximum of three passengers inside and one servant outside (such was the popularity of these new faster carriages that the number of licences was doubled the following year).

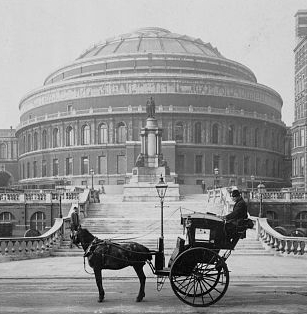
A Hansom cab in 1904 outside the Royal Albert Hall, London

Shortly afterwards even lighter carriages began to be licensed: the two-wheel, single-horse cabriolets, or cabs, which were licensed to carry no more than two passengers. In 1834, the hansom cab was patented by Joseph Hansom: a jaunty single-horse, two-wheel carriage with a distinctive appearance, designed to carry passengers safely in an urban environment. The hansom cab quickly established itself as the standard two-wheel hackney carriage and remained in use into the 20th century.

In 1836 the Clarence was introduced to London's streets: a type of small four-wheel enclosed carriage drawn by one or two horses. These became known as 'growlers' because of the sound they made on the cobbled streets. Much slower than a hansom cab, they had room for up to four passengers, plus one servant, and space on the roof for luggage. They remained in use as the standard form of four-wheeled hackney carriage until replaced by motorised taxi cabs in the early 20th century.

A small, usually two-wheeled, one-horse hackney vehicle called a noddy once plied the roads in Ireland and Scotland. The French had a small hackney coach called a fiacre.

=== Motorisation ===
In 1897, electric hackney carriages appeared. There was a London Electrical Cab Company: the cabs were informally called Berseys after the manager who designed them, Walter Bersey. Another nickname was Hummingbirds from the sound that they made.

In August 1897, 25 were introduced. By 1898, there were 50 more. During the early 20th century, cars generally replaced horse-drawn models. In 1910, the number of motor cabs on London streets outnumbered horse-drawn growlers and hansoms for the first time. At the time of the outbreak of World War I, the ratio was seven to one in favour of motorized cabs. The last horse-drawn hackney carriage ceased service in London in 1947.

UK regulations define a hackney carriage as a taxicab allowed to ply the streets looking for passengers to pick up, as opposed to private hire vehicles (sometimes called minicabs), which may pick up only passengers who have previously booked or who visit the taxi operator's office. In 1999, the first of a series of fuel cell powered taxis were tried out in London. The "Millennium Cab" built by ZeTek gained television coverage and great interest when driven in the Sheraton Hotel ballroom in New York by Judd Hirsch, the star of the television series Taxi. ZeTek built three cabs but ceased activities in 2001.

=== Plug-in electric vehicles ===
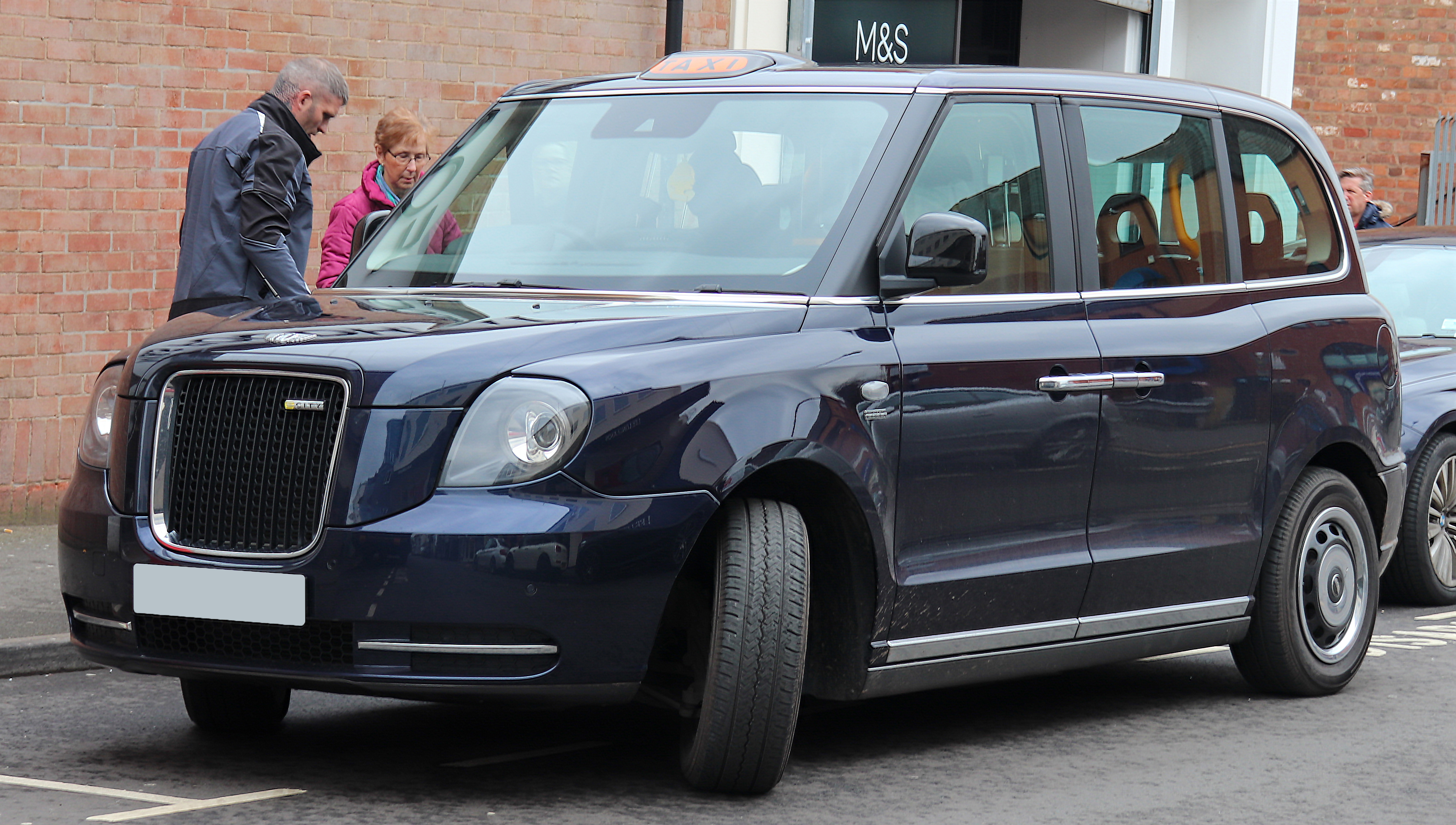
A LEVC TX cab

In 2014, the Mayor of London announced that taxis would be required to be able to work in zero-emission mode by 2018. In December 2017, the London EV Company launched the first taxi capable of emitting zero emissions, the LEVC TX, weeks before the requirement came into effect. According to LEVC, the introduction of the model helped to cut NO_{x} emissions of the London taxi fleet by 60%.

In December 2023, TfL announced that 7,972 of the 14,690 licensed taxis were capable of emitting zero emissions.

=== Self-driving vehicles ===
In August 2026, Transport for London announced that Wayve had been given license to operate self-driving private hire vehicles. Under the terms of these licenses, a driver must remain control of the vehicle at all times - additional approval from the Driver and Vehicle Standards Agency would be required for there to be no driver present. Wayve will be using Ford Mach-E vehicles in partnership with Uber.

== Black cabs ==
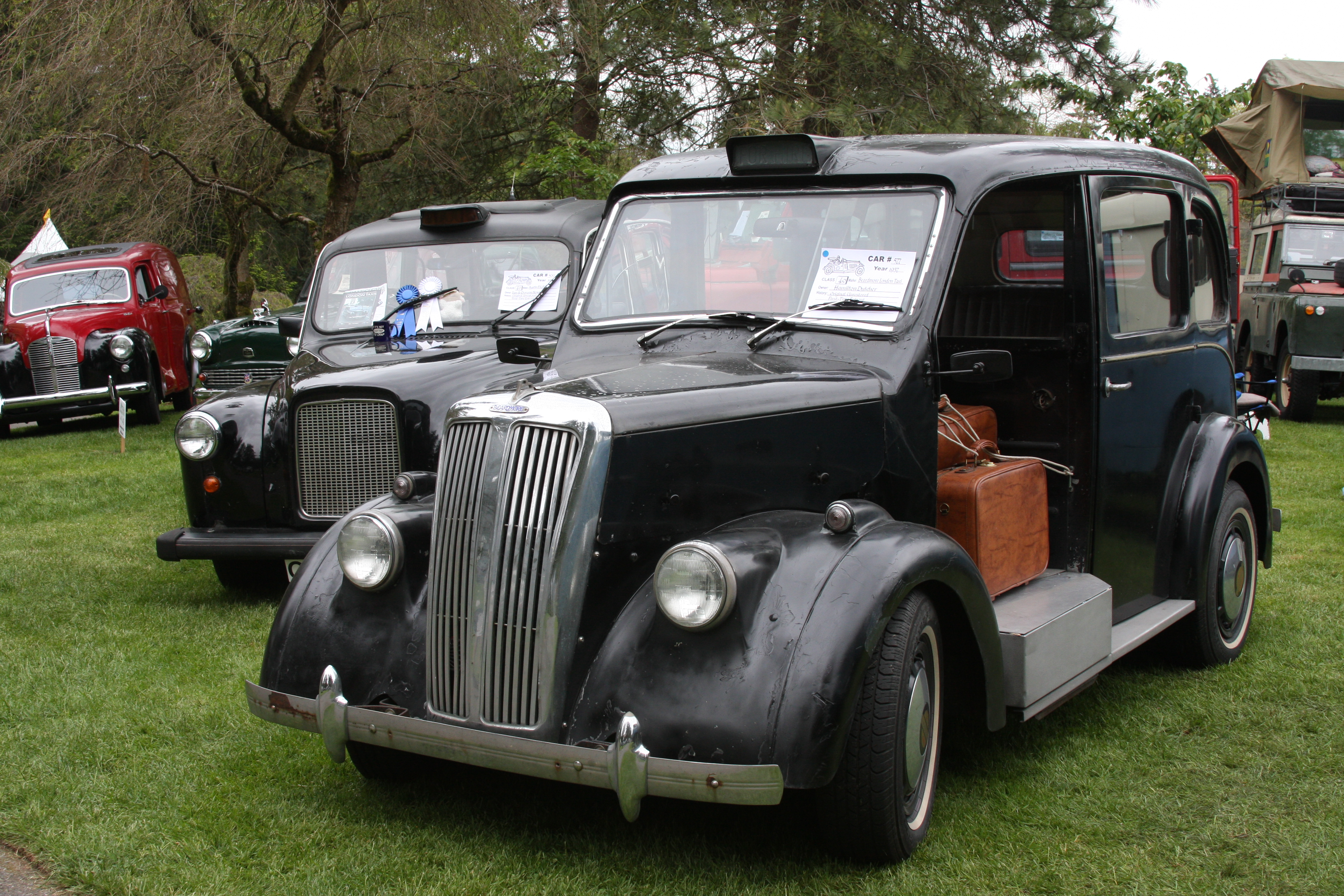
Until the late 1950s, vehicles licensed as London taxis were required to be provided with a luggage platform, open to the street, on the pavement (sidewalk) side, at the front, beside the driver, in place of the front passenger seat found on other passenger cars (including taxis licensed for use in other British cities).

Though there has never been law requiring London's taxis to be black, since the end of the Second World War they were sold in a standard colour of black. In the 1970s, this gave rise to the nickname 'black cab' and it has become common currency. Before the Second World War, London's cabs were seen in a variety of colours. They are produced in a variety of colours, sometimes in advertising brand liveries (see below). Fifty golden cabs were produced for the Queen's Golden Jubilee celebrations in 2002.

=== Vehicle design ===
In Edwardian times, Renault and Unic, and smaller players like Charron and Darracq were found. Fiat was also a presence, with their importer d'Arcy Baker running a fleet of 400 cars of the brand. In the 1920s, Beardmore cabs were introduced and were the most popular for a while. They were nicknamed 'the Rolls-Royce of cabs' for their comfort and robustness. Maxwell Monson introduced Citroën cabs, which were cheaper, but crude in comparison to the Beardmore.

In 1930, dealers Mann and Overton struck a deal with the Austin to bring a modified version of the Austin 12/4 car to the London taxi market. This established Austin as dominant until the end of the 1970s and Mann and Overton until 2012. The Austin FX4, launched in 1958, which stayed in production until 1997 under successive manufacturers is perhaps the most iconic and recognised of all hackney carriages and set the basic styling parameters of its successors.

Morrises cabs were seen in small numbers, but after the Second World War, produced the Oxford, made by Wolseleys.

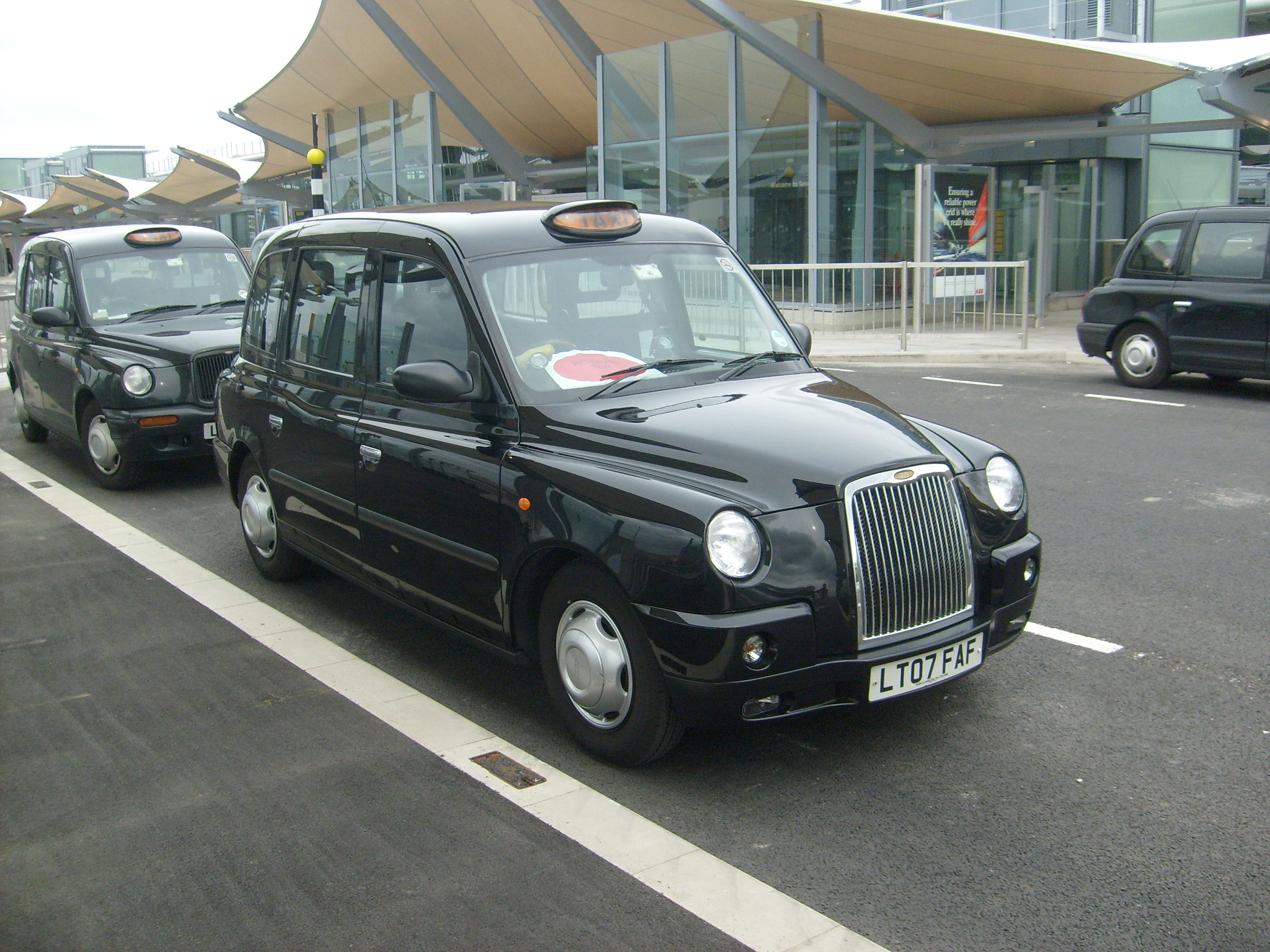
A TX4 hackney carriage at Heathrow Airport Terminal 5

Outside of London, the regulations governing the hackney cab trade are different. Four-door saloon cars have been highly popular as hackney carriages, but with disability regulations growing in strength and some councils offering free licensing for disabled-friendly vehicles, many operators are now opting for wheelchair-adapted taxis such as the LEVC TX of London Electric Vehicle Company (LEVC). London taxis have broad rear doors that open very wide (or slide), and an electrically controlled ramp that is extended for access.

Other models of specialist taxis include the Peugeot E7 and rivals from Fiat, Ford, Volkswagen, and Mercedes-Benz. These vehicles normally allow six or seven passengers, although some models can accommodate eight. Some of these minibus taxis include a front passenger seat next to the driver, while others reserve this space solely for luggage.

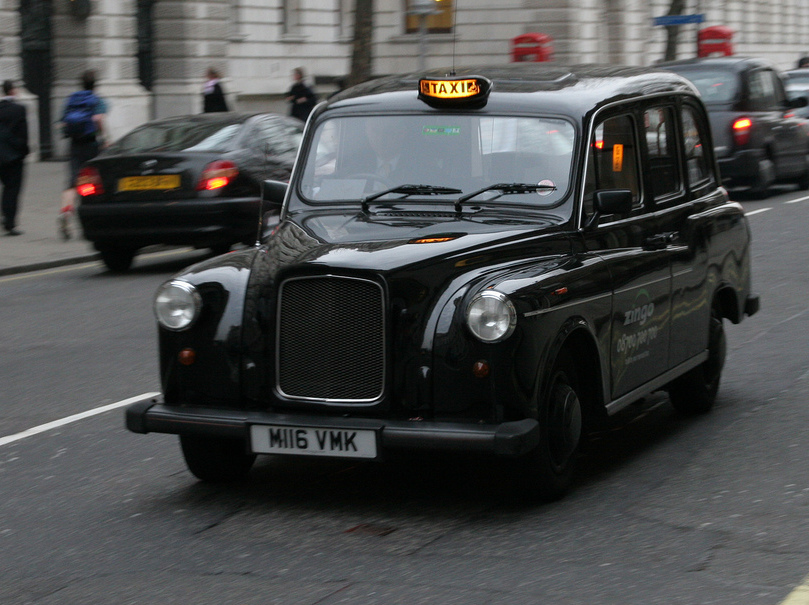
An FX4, made from 1958 to 1997. The for hire signage is a distinguishing feature of the hackney carriage.

London taxis must have a turning circle not greater than 8.535 m (28 ft). One reason for this is the configuration of the famed Savoy Hotel: the hotel entrance's small roundabout meant that vehicles needed the small turning circle to navigate it. That requirement became the legally required turning circles for all London cabs, while the custom of a passenger's sitting on the right, behind the driver, provided a reason for the right-hand traffic in Savoy Court, allowing hotel patrons to board and alight from the driver's side.

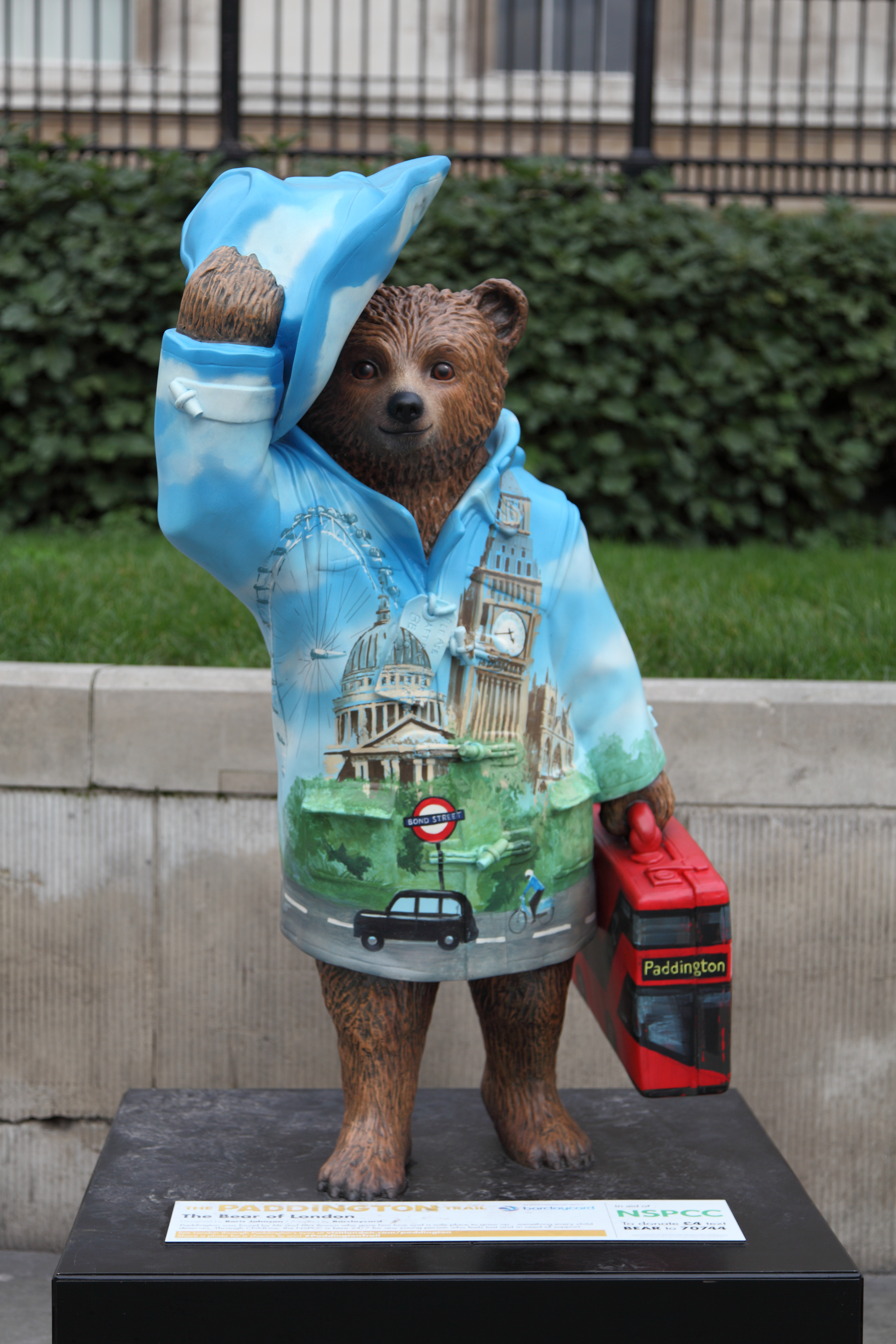
A hackney carriage featuring in a London-themed Paddington Bear statue in Trafalgar Square, 2014

The design standards for London taxis are set out in the Conditions of Fitness, which are now published by Transport for London. The first edition was published in May 1906, by the Public Carriage Office, which was then part of the Metropolitan Police. These regulations set out the conditions under which a taxi may operate and have been updated over the years to keep pace with motor car development and legislation. Changes include regulating the taximeter (made compulsory in 1907), advertisements and the turning circle of 8.535 m (28 ft). Until the beginning of the 1980s, London Taxis were not allowed to carry any advertisements.

The London Taxis fleet has been fully accessible since 1 January 2000, following the introduction of the first accessible taxi in 1987. On 14 December 2010, Mayor of London Boris Johnson released an air quality strategy paper encouraging phasing out of the oldest of the LT cabs, and proposing a £1m fund to encourage taxi owners to upgrade to low-emission vehicles. Since 2018, all newly registered taxis in London must be zero emission, and as of December 2023 more than half of the 14,700 fleet is zero emission capable.

As part of the Transported by Design programme of activities, on 15 October 2015, after two months of public voting, the black cab was elected by Londoners as their favourite transport design icon.

In 2017, the LEVC TX was introduced – a purpose-built hackney carriage, built as a plug-in hybrid range-extender electric vehicle. By April 2022, over 5,000 TX's had been sold in London, around a third of London's taxi fleet. In October 2019 the first fully electric cab since the Bersey in 1897, the Dynamo Taxi, was launched with a 187-mile range and with the bodywork based on Nissan's NV200 platform.

== Driver qualification ==
In London, hackney-carriage drivers have to pass a test called The Knowledge to demonstrate that they have an intimate knowledge of the geography of London streets, important buildings, etc. Learning The Knowledge allows the driver to become a member of the Worshipful Company of Hackney Carriage Drivers. There are two types of badge, a yellow one for the suburban areas and a green one for all of London. The green one is considered far more difficult.

Drivers who own their cabs as opposed to renting from a garage are known as "mushers". Those who have just passed the "knowledge" are known as "butter boys". As of 2023 there are around 15,100 black cabs in London, licensed by the Public Carriage Office.

Elsewhere, councils have their own regulations. Some merely require a driver to pass a DBS disclosure and have a reasonably clean driving licence, while others use their own local versions of London's The Knowledge test.

Notable London cab drivers include:

- Alfred Collins, who retired in 2007 at the age of 92, was the oldest cab driver and had been driving for 70 years.
- Fred Housego is a former London taxi driver who became a television and radio personality and presenter after winning the BBC television quiz Mastermind in 1980.
- Clive Efford, Labour MP for the London constituency of Eltham, was a cab driver for 10 years before entering parliament in 1997.

== Knowledge of London ==
The London taxicab driver is required to be able to decide routes immediately in response to a passenger's request or traffic conditions, rather than stopping to look at a map, relying on satellite navigation or asking a controller by radio. Consequently, the "Knowledge of London" is the in-depth study of a number of pre-set London street routes and all places of interest that taxi drivers in that city must complete to obtain a licence to operate a black cab. It was initiated in 1865 and has changed little since.

It is the world's most demanding training course for taxi drivers, and applicants will usually need to pass at least twelve "appearances" (periodical one-on-one oral examinations undertaken throughout the qualification process), with the whole process typically taking three to four years to pass.

=== Course details ===
Three hundred and twenty standard routes through central London, or "runs", are defined in the Guide to Learning the Knowledge of London, which is produced by the Public Carriage Office. In all, some 25,000 streets within a six-mile radius of Charing Cross are covered, along with the major arterial routes through the rest of London.

A taxicab-driver must learn these routes, as well as the "points of interest" along and within 1/2 mile (0.80 km) of each end of those routes including streets, squares, clubs, hospitals, hotels, theatres, embassies, government and public buildings, railway stations, police stations, courts, diplomatic buildings, important places of worship, cemeteries, crematoria, parks and open spaces, sports and leisure centres, places of learning, restaurants and historic buildings.

The Knowledge includes details such as the order of theatres on Shaftesbury Avenue, and the names and order of the side streets and traffic signals passed on a route.

There are a number of Knowledge Schools that provide books, maps and classroom tuition which help Knowledge students to learn the 320 runs and points of interest. There are separate, shorter courses for suburban London, with 30 to 50 runs, depending on the sector.

=== Knowledge boys and girls ===
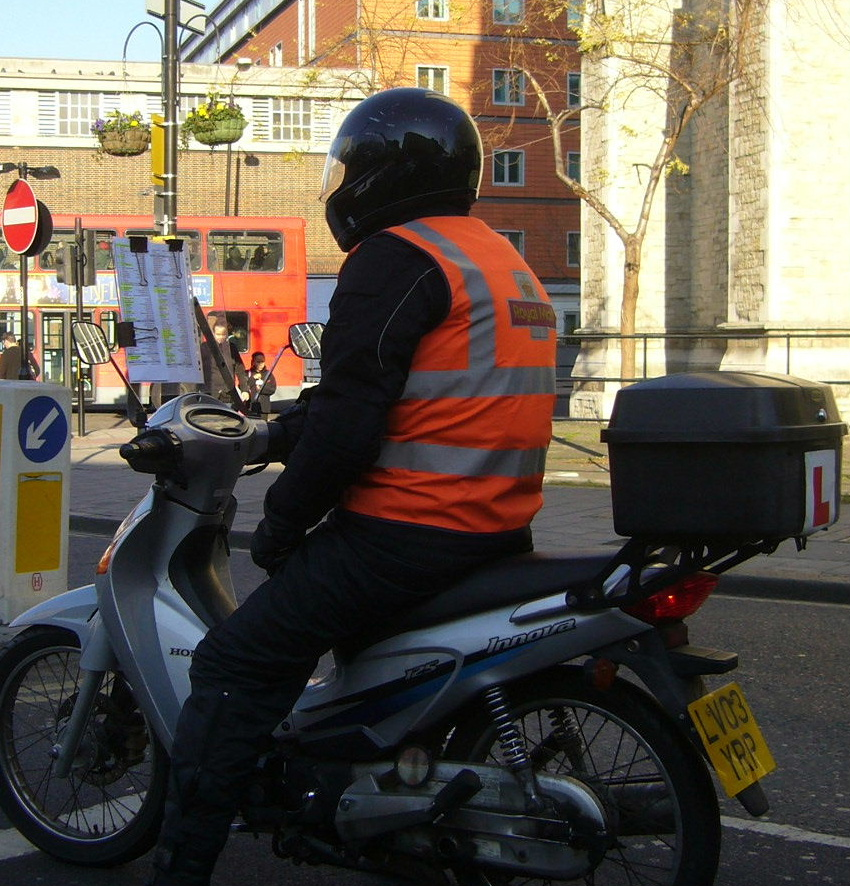
A "Knowledge boy" on a Honda Innova ANF125

During training, would-be cabbies, known as Knowledge boys or Knowledge girls, usually follow these routes around London on a motor scooter, and can be identified by the clipboard fixed to the handlebars and showing details of the streets to be learned that day.

Taxi-driver applicants must be 'of good character', meeting strict requirements regarding any criminal record, then first pass a written test which qualifies them to make an "appearance". At appearances, Knowledge boys and girls must, without looking at a map, identify the two points of interest in metropolitan London that their examiner chooses and then choose the shortest and most sensible route from one to the other. For each route, the applicants must recite the names of the roads used, when they cross junctions, use roundabouts, and make turns, and what is 'alongside' them at each point.

=== Academic research ===
Knowledge boys/girls and their online learning communities have been the subject of academic research, including a PhD dissertation by Drew Ross at Oxford University.

There is evidence that training for the Knowledge can measurably alter the hippocampus of trainee cab drivers. The hippocampus is the area of the brain used for spatial memory and navigation, and is generally larger in taxi drivers than in the general population.

=== Film and literature ===
A humorous 1979 television film about this learning experience, called The Knowledge, was written by Jack Rosenthal for Euston Films, and was in 2000 voted number 83 in a list of the 100 Greatest British Television Programmes compiled by the British Film Institute.

In the Up Series documentary films, Tony Walker is seen on his motor scooter learning "The Knowledge" before becoming a cab driver. Later, his wife Debbie joins him after qualifying herself.

In the Chas—The Knowledge miniseries, which was a spin-off from the comic book Hellblazer, Chas Chandler's job as a taxi driver is the basis for various plot elements of the series.

The Knowledge, its runs, and to a certain extent the role of the PCO, form the basis for a future religion in Will Self's The Book of Dave.

== TfL Taxi and Private Hire office ==
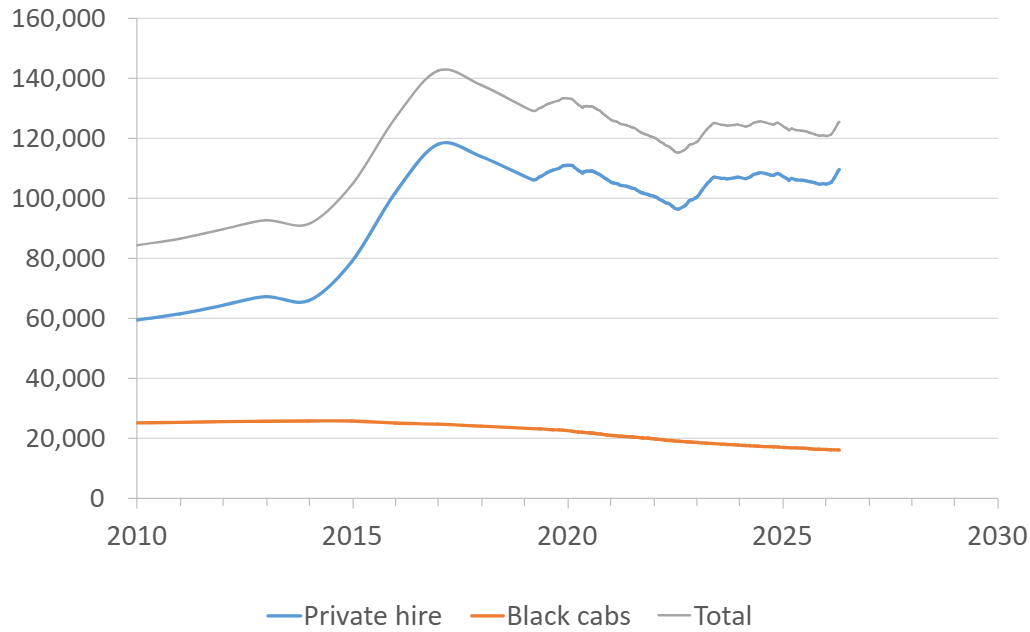
Taxis and private hire driver licences in London from 2010 to 2022

In 2000, the Public Carriage Office (PCO), which regulated and licenses taxis and private hire, commonly known as minicabs, was transferred from the Metropolitan Police to become part of Transport for London. In 2015, there were around 298,000 licensed drivers in England, of which 164,000 were private hire licences, 62,000 were taxi licences and 72,000 were dual licences. Greater London, a metropolitan area with a population of about eight million, has no grid plan laying out streets either parallel or at right angles to each other. The streets of London follow complex patterns.

The Taxi and Private Hire office is the body responsible for licensing taxicabs within Greater London. Taxi and Private Hire is part of Transport for London and is responsible for licensing the familiar London taxicab, or black cab, and also licenses private hire or minicab services. Black cabs were traditionally coloured black, but this is not a requirement and cabs are painted in other colours, sometimes bearing advertising. They are traditionally called black cabs to distinguish them from minicabs.

=== History ===
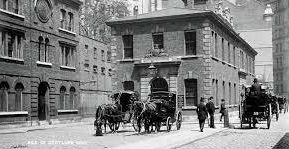
Cabs gathered around the Public Carriage Office's home from 1850 to 1919 (right), located beside the original Scotland Yard (left, with clock)

Since 1600 public carriages for hire have been a feature of London life. The discarded coaches of aristocratic families, complete with their coat of arms, were among the first hackney carriages to ply for hire. They were the forerunners of the French hackney carriage or cab (cabriolet) which first appeared in London around 1820.

The first horseless cab, the Bersey electric-powered vehicle, appeared in 1897, followed by the first internal combustion engine cab in 1903. At that time London still had more than 11,000 horse-drawn cabs. The last horse-drawn cab was removed from service in 1947. As of July 2019, there are over 21,000 licensed vehicles on London's roads.

Regulation of the trade passed to the Registrar of Metropolitan Public Carriages (better known as the Public Carriage Office), formed by the Hackney Carriages, Metropolis Act 1838 and transferred to the Metropolitan Police in 1850. It was originally based in a small building called "the Bungalow" near the original site of Scotland Yard at the north end of Whitehall, remaining there even when the Yard moved to the Norman Shaw Buildings in 1890. It moved to 109 Lambeth Road in 1919, remaining there until 1966, when it moved to 15 Penton Street, Islington. In 2010 it moved again to the Palestra Building at 197 Blackfriars Road, Southwark.

=== Present role ===
A Public Carriage Office licence plate, as seen on the back of all licensed hackney carriages, 2006

On the formation of Transport for London on 3 July 2000, the licensing authority changed; however, the day-to-day licensing function remained with the Public Carriage Office.

With the introduction of the Private Hire Vehicles (London) Act 1998 the role of the PCO has been expanded to include the licensing of private hire operators, drivers and vehicles, bringing the capital into line with the rest of England and Wales.

In November 2005, in the report Where to, Guv?, the London Assembly's Transport Committee reported on a review of the Public Carriage Office and made some key recommendations.

=== Private Hire Vehicles (London) Act 1998 ===
Private Hire Vehicles (London) Act 1998 (Note: Section 12(1).)
- Act of Parliament
- Parliament of the United Kingdom
- Long title: An Act to provide for the licensing and regulation of private hire vehicles, and drivers and operators of such vehicles, within the metropolitan police district and the City of London; and for connected purposes.
- Citation: 1998 c. 34
- Introduced by: George Young MP (Commons); Baroness Gardner of Parkes (Lords)
- Territorial extent: England and Wales (Note: Section 12(3)–(4).)

Dates
- Royal assent: 28 July 1998
- Commencement: Various (Note: Section 40(2).)
Other legislation
| Amends | London Cab Act 1968; Local Government (Miscellaneous Provisions) Act 1976; Public Passenger Vehicles Act 1981; Civic Government (Scotland) Act 1982; Transport Act 1985; Broadcasting Act 1990; Transport and Works Act 1992 |
| Repeals/revokes | London Cab Act 1973 |
| Amended by | Greater London Authority Act 1999; Greater London Authority Act 1999 (Commencement No. 8 and Consequential Provisions) Order 2000; Courts Act 2003 (Consequential Provisions) Order 2005; Road Safety Act 2006; Transport for London Act 2008; Immigration Act 2016; Pedicabs (London) Act 2024 |

Status: Amended

Text of statute as originally enacted

Revised text of statute as amended

The Private Hire Vehicles (London) Act 1998 (c. 34) was passed giving the Public Carriage Office the power to regulate private hire vehicles.

=== Pedicabs (London) Act 2024 ===
Pedicabs (London) Act 2024 (Note: Section 11.)
- Act of Parliament
- Parliament of the United Kingdom
- Long title: An Act to make provision for regulating pedicabs in public places in Greater London; and for connected purposes.
- Citation: 2024 c. 7
- Introduced by: Mark Harper MP, Secretary of State for Transport (Commons); Lord Davies of Gower (Lords)
- Territorial extent: England and Wales (Note: Section 10.)

Dates
- Royal assent: 25 April 2024
- Commencement: 25 June 2024 (Note: Section 9.)
Other legislation
| Amends | Private Hire Vehicles (London) Act 1998 |

Status: Current legislation

History of passage through Parliament

Text of statute as originally enacted

The Pedicabs (London) Act 2024 (c. 7) was passed giving TfL the power to regulate pedicabs within guidance published by the Secretary of State for Transport.

== Statistics ==
How the numbers of Taxi and private hire drivers in London have changed since 2005. View source data.
