= London Hackney Carriage Act 1831 =

Act of the Parliament of the United Kingdom

London Hackney Carriage Act 1831 (Note: The citation of this act by this short title was authorised by section 1 of, and the first schedule to, the Short Titles Act 1896. Due to the repeal of those provisions it is now authorised by section 19(2) of the Interpretation Act 1978.)
- Act of Parliament
- Parliament of the United Kingdom
- Long title: An Act to amend the Laws relating to Hackney Carriages, and to Waggons, Carts, and Drays, used in the Metropolis; and to place the Collection of the Duties on Hackney Carriages and on Hawkers and Pedlars in England under the Commissioners of Stamps.
- Citation: 1 & 2 Will. 4. c. 22
- Territorial extent: United Kingdom

Dates
- Royal assent: 22 September 1831
- Commencement: 5 January 1832 (Note: Section 1.)
Other legislation
Amends	See § Repealed enactments
Repeals/revokes	See § Repealed enactments
Amended by	London Hackney Carriages Act 1843; Revenue Act 1869; Statute Law Revision Act 1874; Summary Jurisdiction Act 1884; Statute Law Revision (No. 2) Act 1888; Statute Law Revision Act 1890; Public Authorities Protection Act 1893; Statute Law Revision Act 1959; London Cab Act 1968; Statute Law (Repeals) Act 1973; Statute Law (Repeals) Act 1976; Criminal Law Act 1977; Statute Law (Repeals) Act 1989; Statute Law (Repeals) Act 1993; Statute Law (Repeals) Act 2004; Transport for London Act 2008

Status: Amended

Text of statute as originally enacted

Revised text of statute as amended

Text of the London Hackney Carriage Act 1831 as in force today (including any amendments) within the United Kingdom, from legislation.gov.uk.

The London Hackney Carriage Act 1831 (1 & 2 Will. 4. c. 22) is an act of the Parliament of the United Kingdom that consolidated enactments related to hackney carriages.

== Provisions ==
The act provides for a test for drunkenness of proprietors, drivers, and other persons having "care of hackney carriage" endangering any person in their "life, limbs, or property".

=== Repealed enactments ===
Section 1 of the act repealed 26 enactments, listed in that section.

Citation	Short title	Description	Extent of repeal
9 Ann. c. 16 (Note: This is the citation in The Statutes of the Realm.)	Stamps (No. 2) Act 1710	An Act passed in the Ninth Year of the Reign of Queen Anne, made for the Purpose (among other Things) of licensing and regulating Hackney Coaches and Chairs.	As in any Manner relates to the licensing or regulating of Hackney Coaches or Chairs.
10 Ann. c. 18	Taxation Act 1711	An Act of the Tenth Year of the said Queen Anne, made for the Purpose (among other Things) of licensing an additional Number of Hackney Chairs.	As in any Manner relates to the licensing or regulating of Hackney Coaches or Chairs.
12 Ann. c. 15	Hackney Chairs Act 1712	An Act passed in the Twelfth Year of the Reign of the said Queen Anne, intituled An Act for explaining the Acts for licensing Hackney Chairs.	The whole act.
1 Geo. 1. St. 2. c. 57	Hackney Coaches, etc. Act 1715	An Act passed in the First Year of the Reign of His Majesty King George the First, made for the Purpose (among other Things) of better regulating Hackney Coaches within the Cities of London and Westminster and the Weekly Bills of Mortality.	As in any Manner relates to the licensing or regulating of Hackney Coaches or Chairs.
3 Geo. 1. c. 7	National Debt Act 1716	An Act of the Third Year of the Reign of the said King George the First, passed for the Purpose (among other Things) of redeeming certain Duties, Revenues, and Annuities, and for establishing a general yearly Fund for the future Payment of Annuities at several Rates, to be payable and transferable at the Bank of England, and redeemable by Parliament.	As in any Manner relates to the licensing or regulating of Hackney Coaches or Chairs.
12 Geo. 1. c. 12	Taxation, etc. Act 1725	An Act of the Twelfth Year of the Reign of the said King George the First, passed for the Purpose (among other Things) of adding One hundred additional Hackney Chairs to those already licensed.	As in any Manner relates to the licensing or regulating of Hackney Coaches or Chairs.
16 Geo. 2. c. 26	Continuance of Laws, etc. Act 1742	An Act of the Sixteenth .Year of the Reign of His Majesty King George the Second, passed for the Purpose of continuing several Laws relating (among other Things) to the additional Number of One hundred Hackney Chairs, and to the Powers given for regulating Hackney Coaches and Chairs.	As in any Manner relates to the licensing or regulating of Hackney Coaches or Chairs.
18 Geo. 2. c. 33	Carts on Highways Act 1744	An Act of the Eighteenth Year of the Reign of the said King George the Second, passed for the Purpose of preventing the Misbehaviour of the Drivers of Carts in the Streets of London, Westminster, and the Limits of the Weekly Bills of Mortality, and for other Purposes.	As in any Manner relates to the registering or numbering of Carts, Cars, Drays, and other Carriages driven or used within the Cities of London and Westminster and the Suburbs thereof, the Borough of Southwark, and the Limits of the Weekly Bills of Mortality.
30 Geo. 2. c. 22	Traffic on Highways Act 1757	An Act of the Thirtieth Year of the Reign of the said King George the Second, passed for the Purpose of explaining and amending the said last-mentioned Act.	As in any Manner relates to the registering or numbering of Carts, Cars, Drays, and other Carriages driven or used within the Cities of London and Westminster and the Suburbs thereof, the Borough of Southwark, and the Limits of the Weekly Bills of Mortality.
33 Geo. 2. c. 25	Hackney Chairs, etc. Act 1759	An Act passed in the Thirty-third Year of the Reign of the said King George the Second, intituled Act for continuing certain Laws relating to the additional Number of One hundred Hackney Chairs, and to the Powers given for regulating Hackney Coaches and Chairs.	The whole act.
4 Geo. 3. c. 36	Bankrupts, etc. Act 1763	An Act of the Fourth Year of the Reign of His late Majesty King George the Third, passed for the Purpose (among other Things) of extending the Laws relating, to Hackney Coaches to the Counties of Kent and Essex.	As in any Manner relates to such last-mentioned Purpose.
7 Geo. 3. c. 44	Stamps (No. 2) Act 1766	Two several Acts passed respectively in the Seventh and Tenth Years of the Reign of the said King George the Third, for the Purpose (among other Things) of explaining and amending several Acts of Parliament relating to Hackney Coaches and Chairs.	As in any Manner relates to such last-mentioned Purpose.
10 Geo. 3. c. 44	False Weights and Scales Act 1770	Two several Acts passed respectively in the Seventh and Tenth Years of the Reign of the said King George the Third, for the Purpose (among other Things) of explaining and amending several Acts of Parliament relating to Hackney Coaches and Chairs.	As in any Manner relates to such last-mentioned Purpose.
11 Geo. 3. c. 24	Hackney Coaches Act 1771	An Act passed in the Eleventh Year of the Reign of the said King George the Third, intituled An Act for licensing an additional Number of Hackney Coaches, and applying the Monies arising thereby.	The whole act.
11 Geo. 3. c. 28	Hackney Coachmen Act 1771	An Act passed in the said Eleventh Year of the Reign of the said King George the Third, intituled An Act for punishing Offences committed by Hackney Coachmen and Chairmen within certain Districts and Places therein mentioned, and for renewing the Registry of Carts and Carriages.	The whole act.
12 Geo. 3. c. 49	Hackney Coaches Act 1772	An Act of the Twelfth Year of the Reign of the said King George the Third, passed for the Purpose of explaining and amending the said recited Act of the Seventh Year of the same King's Reign, so far as the same relates to Hackney Coaches.	The whole act.
24 Geo. 3. Sess. 2. c. 27	Hackney Coaches Act 1784	An Act passed in the Twenty-fourth Year of the Reign of His said Majesty King George the Third, intituled An Act for laying an additional Duty on Hackney Coaches, and for explaining and amending several Acts of Parliament relating to Hackney Coaches.	The whole act.
26 Geo. 3. c. 72	Hackney Coaches Act 1786	An Act passed in the Twenty-sixth Year of the Reign of His said Majesty King George the Third, for explaining and amending the said last-recited Act of the Twenty-fourth Year of the Reign of His said Majesty.	The whole act.
32 Geo. 3. c. 47	Hackney Coaches Act 1792	An Act of the Thirty-second Year of the Reign of His said Majesty King George the Third, passed for the Purpose of explaining and amending so much of the said recited Act of the Seventh Year of the Reign of His said Majesty as relates to Hackney Coaches and Chairs.	The whole act.
39 & 40 Geo. 3. c. 47	London Hackney Carriage Act 1800	An Act passed in the Thirty-ninth and Fortieth Years of the Reign of His said Majesty King George the Third, intituled An Act for repealing the Rates and Fares taken by licensed Hackney Coachmen, and for establishing other Rates and Fares in lieu thereof, and for explaining and amending several Laws relating to Hackney Coaches and Chairs.	The whole act.
42 Geo. 3. c. 78	Hackney Coaches, Metropolis Act 1802	An Act passed in the Forty-second Year of the Reign of His said Majesty King George the Third, intituled An Act to authorize the licensing an additional Number of Hackney Coaches.	The whole act.
44 Geo. 3. c. 88	Hackney Coaches Act 1804	An Act passed in the Forty-fourth Year of the Reign of His said Majesty King George the Third, intituled An Act for explaining and amending the several Acts relating to Hackney Coaches employed as Stage Coaches, and for indemnifying the Owners of Hackney Coaches who have omitted to take out Licences pursuant to an Act made in the Twenty fifth Year of His present Majesty.	The whole act.
48 Geo. 3. c. 87	Hackney Coach Fares Act 1808	An Act passed in the Forty-eighth Year of the Reign of His said Majesty King George the Third, intituled An Act for repealing the Rates and Taxes taken by licensed Hackney Coachmen, and for establishing others in lieu thereof, and for amending several Laws relating to Hackney Coaches.	The whole act.
54 Geo. 3. c. 147	Hackney Coaches Act 1814	An Act passed in the Fifty-fourth Year of the Reign of His said Majesty King George the Third, intituled An Act for the better Regulation of the Drivers of licensed Hackney Coaches, for explaining and amending an Act passed in the Forty-eighth Year of His present Majesty, relating to Hackney Coaches, and for authorizing the licensing of a limited Number of Hackney Chariots.	The whole act.
55 Geo. 3. c. 159	Hackney Carriages Act 1815	An Act passed in the Fifty-fifth Year of the Reign of His said Majesty King George the Third, intituled An Act to amend several Acts relating to Hackney Coaches, for authorizing the licensing of an additional Number of Hackney Chariots, and for licensing Carriages drawn by One Horse.	The whole act.
57 Geo. 3. c. 125	Hackney Coach Licences Act 1817	An Act passed in the Fifty-seventh Year of the Reign of His said Majesty King George the Third, intituled An Act to authorize the driving and keeping a Hackney Coach or Chariot under the same Licence.	The whole act.

== Subsequent developments ==
Section 74 of the act was repealed by section 2 of, and the schedule to, the Public Authorities Protection Act 1893 (56 & 57 Vict. c. 61), which came into force on 1 January 1894.

Section 48 of the act was repealed by section 2 of, and the second schedule to, the Statute Law Revision Act 1959 (7 & 8 Eliz. 2. c. 68), which came into force on 29 July 1959.

Section 37, 43–45, 59 and 60 of the act were repealed by section 1(1) of, and part VI of schedule 1 to, the Statute Law (Repeals) Act 1973, which came into force on 18 July 1973.

The following enactments were repealed by section 1(1) of, and part XVII of schedule 1 to, the Statute Law (Repeals) Act 1976, which came into force on 27 May 1976.

- In section 4, the proviso.
- Section 18.
- In section 27, the words from "and for want of sufficient distress" onwards.
- In section 28, the words from "and for want of sufficient distress" to "justice shall direct".
- In section 35, the words "and having thereon any of the numbered plates required by this Act to be fixed on hackney carriages".
- In section 36, the words from "and in default" onwards.
- In section 41, the words from "and upon the refusal" onwards.
- In section 51, the words from "shall stand or ply" to "hackney carriage; or if any such proprietor or driver", and the words "or other person".
- In section 56, the words from "and in default of payment" to "house of correction".
- In section 57, the words from "and in default of payment" onwards.
- Sections 62, 63, 68, 70 and 71.

Section 4 and the words “any officer of stamp duties, or” in section 56 of the act were repealed by section 1(1) of, and part X of schedule 1 to, the Statute Law (Repeals) Act 1989, which came into force on 16 November 1989.

Sections 27 and 28 of the act were repealed by section 1(1) of, and group 2 of part XV of schedule 1 to, the Statute Law (Repeals) Act 1993, which came into force on 5 November 1993.
