= Hackney Carriages, Metropolis Act 1838 =

Act of the Parliament of the United Kingdom

Hackney Carriages, Metropolis Act 1838 (Note: The citation of this act by this short title was authorised by section 5 of, and the second schedule to, the Statute Law Revision Act 1948. Due to the repeal of those provisions, it is now authorised by section 19(2) of the Interpretation Act 1978.)
- Act of Parliament
- Parliament of the United Kingdom
- Long title: An Act for the better Regulation of Hackney Carriages, and of Metropolitan Stage Carriages, and of Wagons, Carts, and Drays, used in and near the Metropolis, and of the Drivers and Attendants thereof.
- Citation: 1 & 2 Vict. c. 79
- Territorial extent: United Kingdom

Dates
- Royal assent: 10 August 1838
- Commencement: 10 August 1838 (Note: The Acts of Parliament (Commencement) Act 1793.)
- Repealed: 22 August 1843
Other legislation
Repealed by	London Hackney Carriages Act 1843

Status: Repealed

Text of statute as originally enacted

The Hackney Carriages, Metropolis Act 1838 (1 & 2 Vict. c. 79) was an act of the Parliament of the United Kingdom that regulated and set up a licensing system for hackney carriages in London, namely the Office of the Registrar of Metropolitan Public Carriages

London Hackney Carriages Act 1850 (Note: The citation of this act by this short title was authorised by section 1 of, and the first schedule to, the Short Titles Act 1896. Due to the repeal of those provisions it is now authorised by section 19(2) of the Interpretation Act 1978.)
- Act of Parliament
- Parliament of the United Kingdom
- Long title: An Act for consolidating the Office of the Registrar of Metropolitan Public Carriages with the Office of Commissioners of Police of the Metropolis, and making other Provisions in regard to the consolidated Offices.
- Citation: 13 & 14 Vict. c. 7
- Territorial extent: United Kingdom

Dates
- Royal assent: 25 March 1850
- Commencement: 1 April 1850 (Note: Section 9.)
Other legislation
Amended by	Statute Law Revision Act 1875; Statute Law (Repeals) Act 2004
Relates to	London Hackney Carriages Act 1843

Status: Amended

Text of statute as originally enacted

Revised text of statute as amended

Text of the Hackney Carriages, Metropolis Act 1838 as in force today (including any amendments) within the United Kingdom, from legislation.gov.uk.

The 1838 act was updated by the London Hackney Carriages Act 1850, (Note: Full title - An Act for consolidating the Office of the Registrar of Metropolitan Public Carriages with the Office of Commissioners of Police of the Metropolis, and making other Provisions in regard to the consolidated Offices (1850, c.7).) (13 & 14 Vict. c. 7) granted royal assent on 25 March 1850 and taking effect from 5 April 1850. That abolished the office of registrar and instead added his duties to those of the Commissioners (later Commissioner) of Police for the Metropolis, head of the Metropolitan Police (later expanded or delegated to an Assistant Commissioner by the Metropolitan Police Act 1856 (19 & 20 Vict. c. 2)), effectively creating the Public Carriage Office, which remained within the Metropolitan Police until 2000 when it was taken over by Transport for London.

The 1850 act also provided retiring allowances for clerks and officers who lost their job due to the abolition of the office of registrar, enabled the commissioners to set up taxi ranks or "standings", repealed any extant provisions on "standings" in acts prior to the London Hackney Carriages Act 1843 (6 & 7 Vict. c. 86) and maintained the ban in the Bloomsbury Square Act 1806 (46 Geo. 3. c. cxxxiv) on hackney coaches in or near Bloomsbury Square.

== Bibliography ==
- The British almanac of the Society for the Diffusion of Useful Knowledge, for the year 1839. The Society for the Diffusion of Useful Knowledge, London, 1839.
