= Hackney carriage =

British car for hire

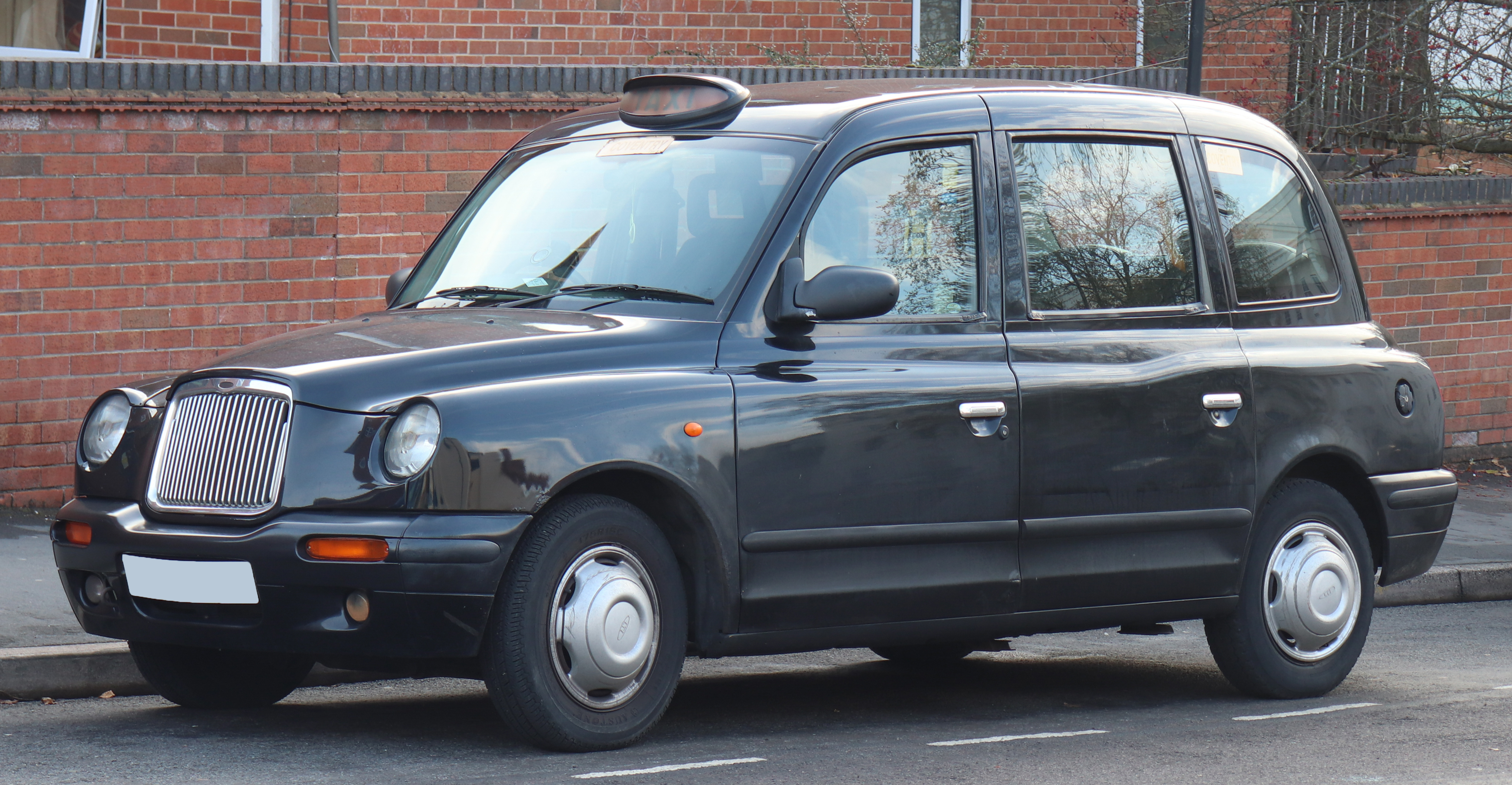
LTI TX2 cab

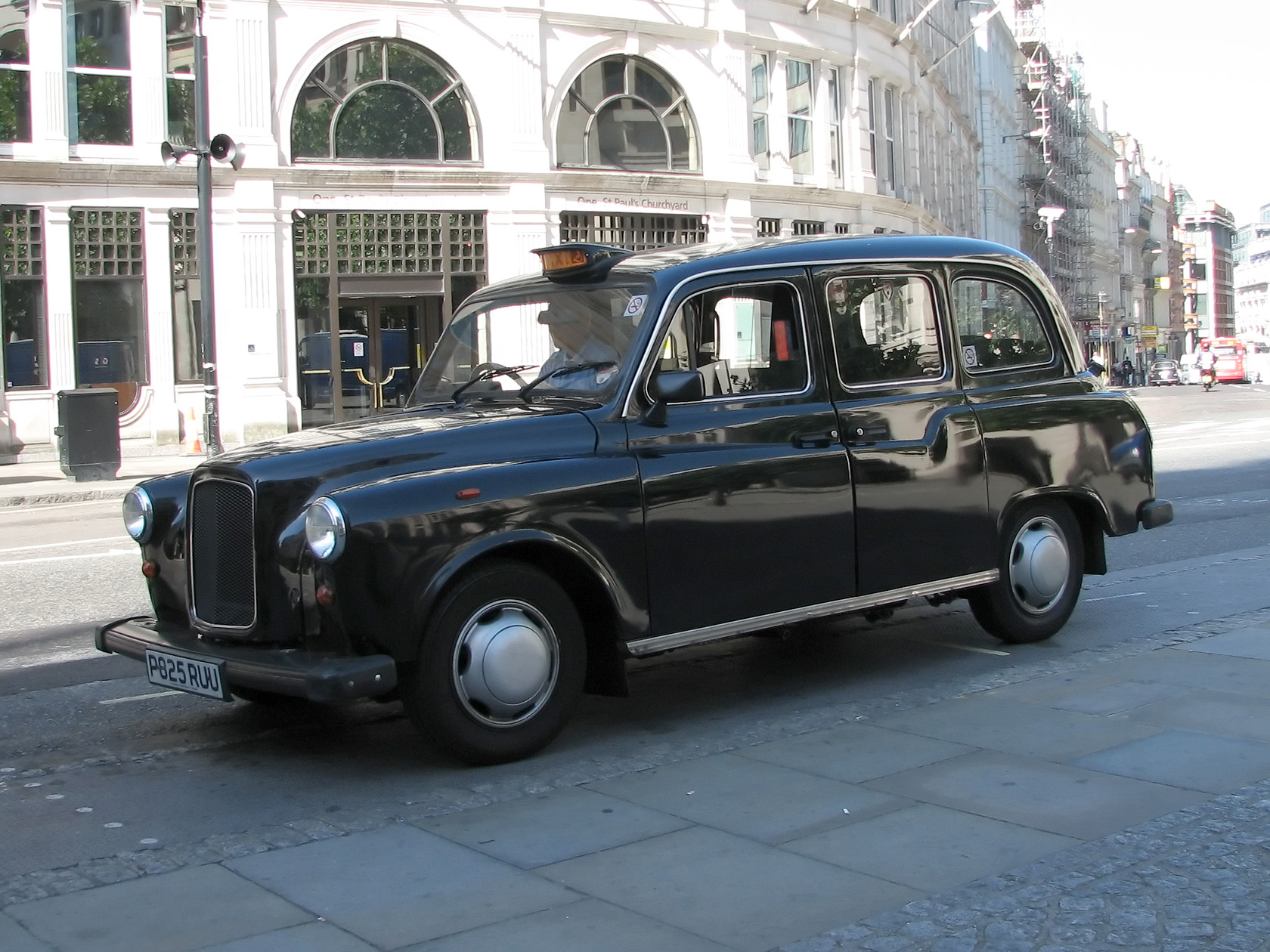
LTI FX4 cab

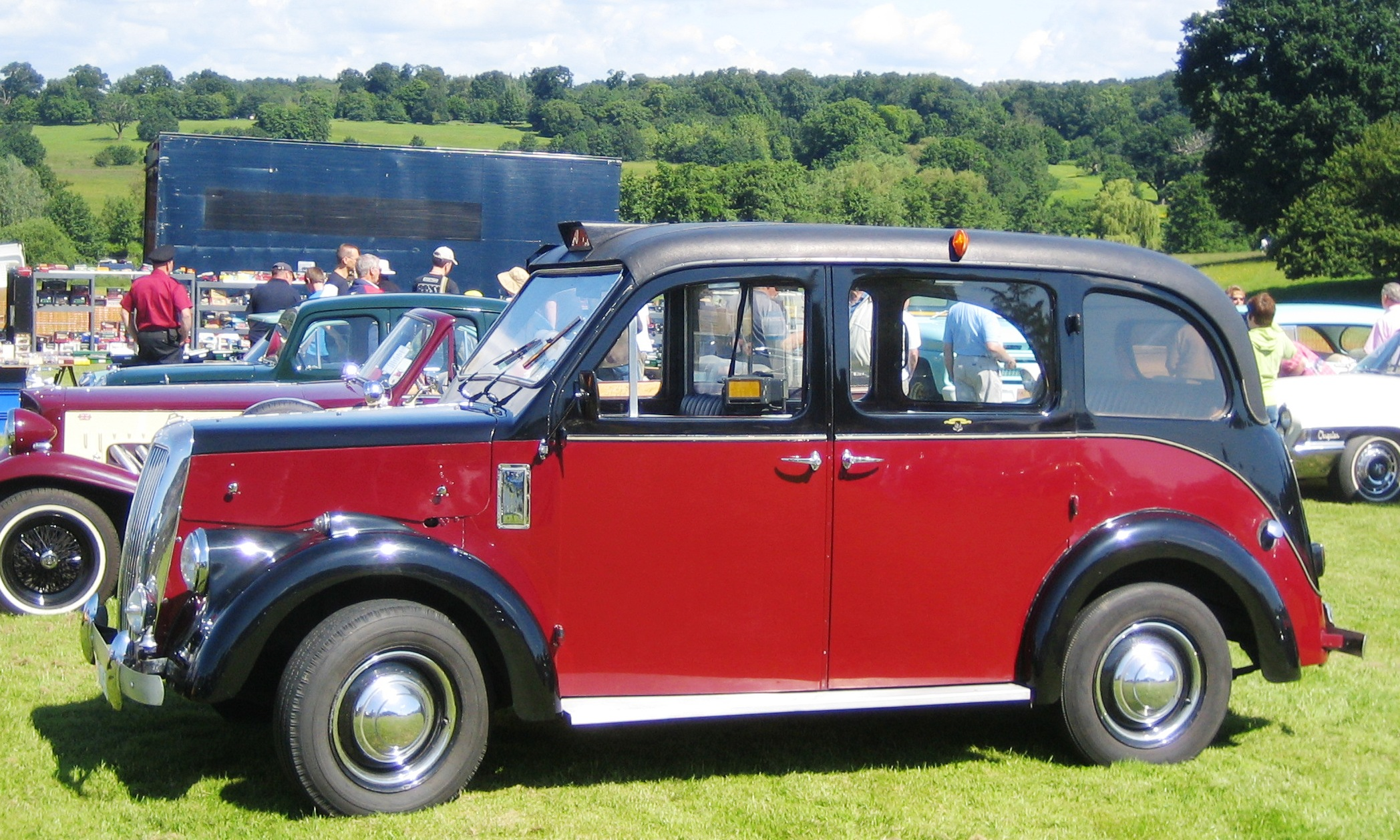
The Beardmore was an alternative taxi design used in London during the 1960s and 1970s.

A hackney or hackney carriage (also called a cab, black cab, hack or taxi) is a carriage or car for hire. A symbol of London and Britain, the black taxi is a common sight on the streets of London. The hackney carriages carry a roof sign TAXI that can be illuminated to indicate their availability for passengers.

In the UK, the name hackney carriage today refers to a taxicab licensed by Transport for London, local authority (non-metropolitan district councils, unitary authorities) or the Department of the Environment depending on region of the country. Some hackney carriages have also been exported for use in other countries.

== Etymology ==
The origin of the word hackney in connection with horses and carriages is uncertain. The origin is often attributed to the London borough of Hackney, whose name likely originated in Old English meaning 'Haka's Island'. Some favour an alternative etymology stemming from the French word haquenée—a horse of medium size, easy to ride, and often a hired horse. The earliest hackney coaches were worn and shabby second-hand coaches from the nobility. Between the condition of the vehicles and the overuse of the street horses, it led to the term hackneyed to indicate something which is worn out. Hack is a shortened form of hackney and appears by the start of the eighteenth century; the word has also applied to the driver, and to the horse.

In modern usage, the term "hackney carriage" remains primarily a term of regulation and not of contemporary speech—whereas "taxi" and "cab" are common parlance. The British carried their practices with them throughout the British Empire and established regulations for public hire transport in many countries. In the 1820s, horses and carriages were imported from England to British Colonial Singapore and, with the passing of the Hackney Carriage Act of 1867, a Hackney Carriage Department was established to regulate public transportation; in 1892 jinrikisha regulation was incorporated into the department. In 1847, Sydney passed a law to regulate hackney carriages in the city and its vicinity. Boston's Hackney Carriage Unit was established in 1854 and still uses the term hackney carriage in their contemporary licensing regulations for taxis, sight-seeing vehicles, horse drawn carriages, and pedicabs within the city. In 1879 British India, the Hackney-Carriage Act was passed to regulate and control hackney carriages.

== History ==
Hackney Coaches, etc. Act 1694
- Act of Parliament
- Parliament of England
- Long title: An Act for the licensing and regulating Hackney-Coaches and Stage-Coaches.
- Citation: 5 & 6 Will. & Mar. c. 22
- Territorial extent: England and Wales

Dates
- Royal assent: 25 April 1694
- Commencement: 7 November 1693 (Note: Start of session.)
- Repealed: 15 July 1867
Other legislation
Repealed by	Statute Law Revision Act 1867

Status: Repealed

Text of statute as originally enacted

Hackney Chairs Act 1712
- Act of Parliament
- Parliament of Great Britain
- Long title: An Act for explaining the Acts for licensing Hackney Chairs.
- Citation: 12 Ann. c. 15: (Ruffhead: 12 Ann. St. 1 c. 14)
- Territorial extent: Great Britain

Dates
- Royal assent: 16 July 1713
- Commencement: 9 April 1713
- Repealed: 5 January 1832
Other legislation
Amended by	Continuance of Laws, etc. Act 1742
Repealed by	London Hackney Carriage Act 1831

Status: Repealed

Text of statute as originally enacted

Hackney Coaches, etc. Act 1715
- Act of Parliament
- Parliament of Great Britain
- Long title: An Act for the better regulating Hackney Coaches, Carts, Drays, Cars, and Waggons, within the Cities of London and Westminster, and the Weekly Bills of Mortality; and for preventing Mischiefs occasioned by the Drivers riding upon such Carts, Drays, Cars, and Waggons.
- Citation: 1 Geo. 1. St. 2. c. 57
- Territorial extent: Great Britain

Dates
- Royal assent: 26 June 1716
- Commencement: 17 March 1715
- Repealed: 15 July 1867
Other legislation
Amended by	Continuance of Laws, etc. Act 1742
Repealed by	Statute Law Revision Act 1867
Relates to	Stamps (No. 2) Act 1710

Status: Repealed

Text of statute as originally enacted

Hackney Coaches Act 1771
- Act of Parliament
- Parliament of Great Britain
- Long title: An Act for licensing an additional Number of Hackney Coaches, and applying the Monies arising thereby.
- Citation: 11 Geo. 3. c. 24
- Territorial extent: Great Britain

Dates
- Royal assent: 12 April 1771
- Commencement: 13 November 1770
- Repealed: 5 January 1832
Other legislation
Repealed by	London Hackney Carriage Act 1831
Relates to	Stamps (No. 2) Act 1710

Status: Repealed

Text of statute as originally enacted

Hackney Coachmen Act 1771
- Act of Parliament
- Parliament of Great Britain
- Long title: An Act for punishing Offences committed by Hackney Coachmen and Chairmen, within certain Districts and Places therein mentioned, and for renewing the Registry of Carts and Carriages.
- Citation: 11 Geo. 3. c. 28
- Territorial extent: Great Britain

Dates
- Royal assent: 29 April 1771
- Commencement: 13 November 1770
- Repealed: 5 January 1832
Other legislation
Repealed by	London Hackney Carriage Act 1831
Relates to	Stamps (No. 2) Act 1710

Status: Repealed

Text of statute as originally enacted

Hackney Coaches Act 1772
- Act of Parliament
- Parliament of Great Britain
- Long title: An Act to explain and amend an Act, made in the Seventh Year of the Reign of His present Majesty, intituled, "An Act for altering the Stamp Duties upon Policies of Assurances; and for reducing the Allowance to be made in respect of the Prompt Payment of the Stamp Duties on Licences for retailing Beer, Ale, and other exciseable Liquors; and for explaining and amending several Acts of Parliament relating to Hackney Coaches and Chairs;" so far as the same relates to Hackney Coaches.
- Citation: 12 Geo. 3. c. 49
- Territorial extent: Great Britain

Dates
- Royal assent: 3 June 1772
- Repealed: 5 January 1832
Other legislation
Amends	Stamps (No. 2) Act 1766
Repealed by	London Hackney Carriage Act 1831

Status: Repealed

Text of statute as originally enacted

Hackney Coaches Act 1784
- Act of Parliament
- Parliament of Great Britain
- Long title: An Act for laying an additional Duty on Hackney Coaches, and for explaining and amending several Acts of Parliament relating to Hackney Coaches.
- Citation: 24 Geo. 3. Sess. 2. c. 27
- Territorial extent: Great Britain

Dates
- Royal assent: 13 August 1784
- Commencement: 4 September 1784 (Note: Section 1.)
- Repealed: 5 January 1832
Other legislation
Amended by	Hackney Coaches Act 1786
Repealed by	London Hackney Carriage Act 1831

Status: Repealed

Text of statute as originally enacted

Hackney Coaches Act 1786
- Act of Parliament
- Parliament of Great Britain
- Long title: An Act for explaining and amending an Act made in the Twenty-fourth Year of the Reign of His present Majesty, intituled, "An Act for laying an additional Duty on Hackney Coaches, and for explaining and amending several Acts of Parliament relating to Hackney Coaches."
- Citation: 26 Geo. 3. c. 72
- Territorial extent: Great Britain

Dates
- Royal assent: 4 July 1786
- Commencement: 1 August 1786
- Repealed: 5 January 1832
Other legislation
Amends	Hackney Coaches Act 1784
Amended by	London Hackney Carriage Act 1800
Repealed by	London Hackney Carriage Act 1831

Status: Repealed

Text of statute as originally enacted

Hackney Coaches Act 1792
- Act of Parliament
- Parliament of Great Britain
- Long title: An Act to explain and amend so much of an Act made in the Seventh Year of the Reign of His present Majesty, as relates to Hackney Coaches and Chairs.
- Citation: 32 Geo. 3. c. 47
- Territorial extent: Great Britain

Dates
- Royal assent: 11 June 1792
- Commencement: 5 July 1792
- Repealed: 5 January 1832
Other legislation
Amends	Stamps (No. 2) Act 1766
Repealed by	London Hackney Carriage Act 1831

Status: Repealed

Text of statute as originally enacted

London Hackney Carriage Act 1800
- Act of Parliament
- Parliament of Great Britain
- Long title: An Act for repealing the Rates and Fares taken by Licenced Hackney Coachmen, and for establishing other Rates and Fares in lieu thereof; and for explaining and amending several Laws relating to Hackney Coaches and Chairs.
- Citation: 39 & 40 Geo. 3. c. 47
- Territorial extent: Great Britain

Dates
- Royal assent: 30 May 1800
- Commencement: 30 May 1800
- Repealed: 5 January 1832
Other legislation
Amends	Hackney Coaches Act 1786
Repealed by	London Hackney Carriage Act 1831

Status: Repealed

Text of statute as originally enacted

Hackney Coaches Act 1804
- Act of Parliament
- Parliament of the United Kingdom
- Long title: An Act for explaining and amending several Acts relating to Hackney Coaches employed as Stage Coaches, and for indemnifying the Owners of Hackney Coaches who have omitted to take out Licences, pursuant to an Act made in the Twenty fifth Year of His present Majesty.
- Citation: 44 Geo. 3. c. 88
- Territorial extent: United Kingdom

Dates
- Royal assent: 20 July 1804
- Commencement: 20 July 1804
- Repealed: 5 January 1832
Other legislation
Repealed by	London Hackney Carriage Act 1831

Status: Repealed

Text of statute as originally enacted

London Hackney Carriages Act 1843 (Note: The citation of this act by this short title was authorised by section 1 of, and the first schedule to, the Short Titles Act 1896. Due to the repeal of those provisions it is now authorised by section 19(2) of the Interpretation Act 1978.)
- Act of Parliament
- Parliament of the United Kingdom
- Long title: An Act for regulating Hackney and Stage Carriages in and near London.
- Citation: 6 & 7 Vict. c. 86
- Territorial extent: United Kingdom

Dates
- Royal assent: 22 August 1843
- Commencement: 22 August 1843 (Note: The Acts of Parliament (Commencement) Act 1793.)
Other legislation
Repeals/revokes	Hackney Carriages, Metropolis Act 1838
Amended by	Revenue Act 1869; Statute Law Revision Act 1874 (No. 2); London Government Act 1963; Statute Law Revision Act 1966; Criminal Justice Act 1967; Statute Law (Repeals) Act 1973; Statute Law (Repeals) Act 1976; Criminal Law Act 1977; Forgery and Counterfeiting Act 1981; Criminal Justice Act 1982; Police and Criminal Evidence Act 1984; Transport Act 1985; Statute Law (Repeals) Act 1989; Statute Law (Repeals) Act 1993; Greater London Authority Act 1999; Courts Act 2003; Statute Law (Repeals) Act 2004; Transport for London Act 2008; Immigration Act 2016

Status: Amended

Text of statute as originally enacted

Revised text of statute as amended

Text of the London Hackney Carriages Act 1843 as in force today (including any amendments) within the United Kingdom, from legislation.gov.uk.

Metropolitan Public Carriage Act 1869
- Act of Parliament
- Parliament of the United Kingdom
- Long title: An Act for amending the Law relating to Hackney and Stage Carriages within the Metropolitan Police District.
- Citation: 32 & 33 Vict. c. 115
- Territorial extent: United Kingdom

Dates
- Royal assent: 11 August 1869
- Commencement: 11 August 1869

Status: Amended

Text of statute as originally enacted

Revised text of statute as amended

Text of the Metropolitan Public Carriage Act 1869 as in force today (including any amendments) within the United Kingdom, from legislation.gov.uk.

London Cab Act 1968 (Note: Section 5(1).)
- Act of Parliament
- Parliament of the United Kingdom
- Long title: An Act to extend the power of the Secretary of State to prescribe fares in respect of journeys by cab within the metropolitan police district and the City of London; to make provision for extending the length of such journeys which the driver of a cab is obliged by law to undertake; to relax restrictions on the parking of cabs; to prohibit the display on certain vehicles in that district or the City of London of signs or notices containing the word "taxi" or "cab" and signs or notices of certain other descriptions; and to restrict the issue, in connection with certain vehicles, of advertisements containing either of those words.
- Citation: 1968 c. 7
- Territorial extent: United Kingdom

Dates
- Royal assent: 15 February 1968
- Commencement: 15 February 1968
Other legislation
Amends	Metropolitan Public Carriage Act 1869
Amended by	London Cab Act 1973; London Regional Transport Act 1984; Private Hire Vehicles (London) Act 1998; Greater London Authority Act 1999; Transport for London (Consequential Provisions) Order 2003; Statute Law (Repeals) Act 2004

Status: Amended

Text of statute as originally enacted

Revised text of statute as amended

Text of the London Cab Act 1968 as in force today (including any amendments) within the United Kingdom, from legislation.gov.uk.

London Cab Act 1973 (Note: Section 3.)
- Act of Parliament
- Parliament of the United Kingdom
- Long title: An Act to amend the London Cab Act 1968.
- Citation: 1973 c. c. 20
- Territorial extent: United Kingdom

Dates
- Royal assent: 23 May 1973
- Commencement: 23 May 1973
- Repealed: 8 June 2004 (Note: The Private Hire Vehicles (London) Act 1998 (Commencement No. 3) Order 2004 (SI 2004/241).)
Other legislation
Amends	London Cab Act 1968
Repealed by	Private Hire Vehicles (London) Act 1998

Status: Repealed

Text of statute as originally enacted

Revised text of statute as amended

Text of the London Cab Act 1973 as in force today (including any amendments) within the United Kingdom, from legislation.gov.uk.

=== Horse-drawn era ===
The widespread use of private coaches by the English aristocracy began to be seen in the 1580s; within fifty years hackney coaches were regularly to be seen on the streets of London. The first documented hackney coaches operated in London in the early 1600s. In the 1620s there was a proliferation of coaches for hire in the metropolis, so much so that they were seen as a danger to pedestrians in the narrow streets of the city, and in 1635 an Order in Council was issued limiting the number allowed. Two years later a system for licensing hackney coachmen was established (overseen by the Master of the Horse).

"An Ordinance for the Regulation of Hackney-Coachmen in London and the places adjacent" was approved by Parliament in 1654, to remedy what it described as the "many Inconveniences [that] do daily arise by reason of the late increase and great irregularity of Hackney Coaches and Hackney Coachmen in London, Westminster and the places thereabouts". The first hackney-carriage licences date from a 1662 act of Parliament, the London and Westminster Streets Act 1662 (14 Cha. 2. c. 2) establishing the Commissioners of Scotland Yard to regulate them. Licences applied literally to horse-drawn carriages, later modernised as hansom cabs (1834), that operated as vehicles for hire. The 1662 act limited the licences to 400; when it expired in 1679, extra licences were created until the Hackney Coaches, etc. Act 1694 (5 & 6 Will. & Mar. c. 22) imposed a limit of 700. The limit was increased to 800 in 1715, 1,000 in 1770 and 1,100 in 1802, before being abolished in 1832. The 1694 act established the Hackney Coach Commissioners to oversee the regulation of fares, licences and other matters; in 1831 their work was taken over by the Stamp Office and in 1869 responsibility for licensing was passed on to the Metropolitan Police. In the 18th and 19th centuries, private carriages were commonly sold off for use as hackney carriages, often displaying painted-over traces of the previous owner's coat of arms on the doors.

There was a distinction between a general hackney carriage and a hackney coach, which was specifically a hireable vehicle with four wheels, two horses and six seats: four on the inside for the passengers and two on the outside (one for a servant and the other for the driver, who was popularly termed the Jarvey (also spelled jarvie)). For many years only coaches, to this specification, could be licensed for hire; but in 1814 the licensing of up to 200 hackney chariots was permitted, which carried a maximum of three passengers inside and one servant outside (such was the popularity of these new faster carriages that the number of licences was doubled the following year).

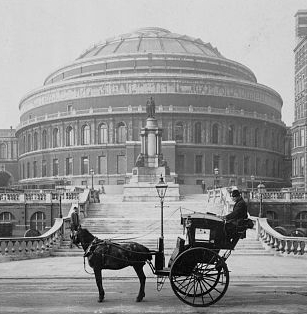
Hansom cab in 1904 outside the Royal Albert Hall, London

Shortly afterwards even lighter carriages began to be licensed: the two-wheel, single-horse cabriolets or 'cabs', which were licensed to carry no more than two passengers. Then, in 1834, the hansom cab was patented by Joseph Hansom: a jaunty single-horse, two-wheel carriage with a distinctive appearance, designed to carry passengers safely in an urban environment. The hansom cab quickly established itself as the standard two-wheel hackney carriage and remained in use into the 20th century.

In 1836, the Clarence was introduced to London's streets: a type of small four-wheel enclosed carriage drawn by one or two horses. These became known as 'growlers' because of the sound they made on the cobbled streets. Much slower than a hansom cab, they nevertheless had room for up to four passengers (plus one servant) and space on the roof for luggage. As such they remained in use as the standard form of four-wheeled hackney carriage until replaced by motorised taxi cabs in the early 20th century.

In the 1857 edition of Thom's Irish Almanac and Official Directory, a table was included of agreed mileage fares which hackney carriages and cabriolets were permitted to charge their passengers for journeys within a radius of ten statute miles of the General Post Office in Dublin city centre. Fares were divided into two fare types; that of Fare 1 - "Not returning with Employer", and Fare 2 - "Returning with Employer, the delay not to exceed 30 minutes".

A small, usually two-wheeled, one-horse hackney vehicle called a noddy once plied the roads in Ireland and Scotland. The French had a small hackney coach called a fiacre.

=== Motorisation ===
Electric hackney carriages appeared before the introduction of the internal combustion engine to vehicles for hire in 1897. In fact there was even London Electrical Cab Company: the cabs were informally called Berseys after the manager who designed them, Walter Bersey. Another nickname was Hummingbirds from the sound that they made. In August 1897, 25 were introduced, and by 1898, there were 50 more. During the early 20th century, cars generally replaced horse-drawn models. In 1910, the number of motor cabs on London streets outnumbered horse-drawn growlers and hansoms for the first time. At the time of the outbreak of World War I, the ratio was seven to one in favour of motorized cabs. The last horse-drawn hackney carriage ceased service in London in 1947.

UK regulations define a hackney carriage as a taxicab allowed to ply the streets looking for passengers to pick up, as opposed to private hire vehicles (sometimes called minicabs), which may pick up only passengers who have previously booked or who visit the taxi operator's office. In 1999, the first of a series of fuel cell powered taxis were tried out in London. The "Millennium Cab" built by ZeTek gained television coverage and great interest when driven in the Sheraton Hotel ballroom in New York by Judd Hirsch, the star of the television series Taxi. ZeTek built three cabs but ceased activities in 2001.

=== Continuing horse-drawn cab services ===
Horse-drawn hackney services continue to operate in parts of the UK, for example in Cockington, Torquay. The town of Windsor, Berkshire, is the last remaining UK town with a continuous lineage of horse-drawn hackney carriages, operated run by Windsor Carriages, the licence having been passed down from driver to driver since the 1830's. The original hackney licence is in place, allowing for passenger travel under the same law that was originally passed in 1662. The city of Bath has an occasional horse-drawn hackney, principally for tourists, but still carrying hackney plates.

== Driver qualification ==
In London, hackney-carriage drivers have to pass a test called The Knowledge to demonstrate that they have an intimate knowledge of the geography of London streets, important buildings, etc. Elsewhere in the UK, councils have their own regulations. Some merely require a driver to pass a DBS disclosure and have a reasonably clean driving licence, while others use their own local versions of London's The Knowledge test.

== Black cabs ==
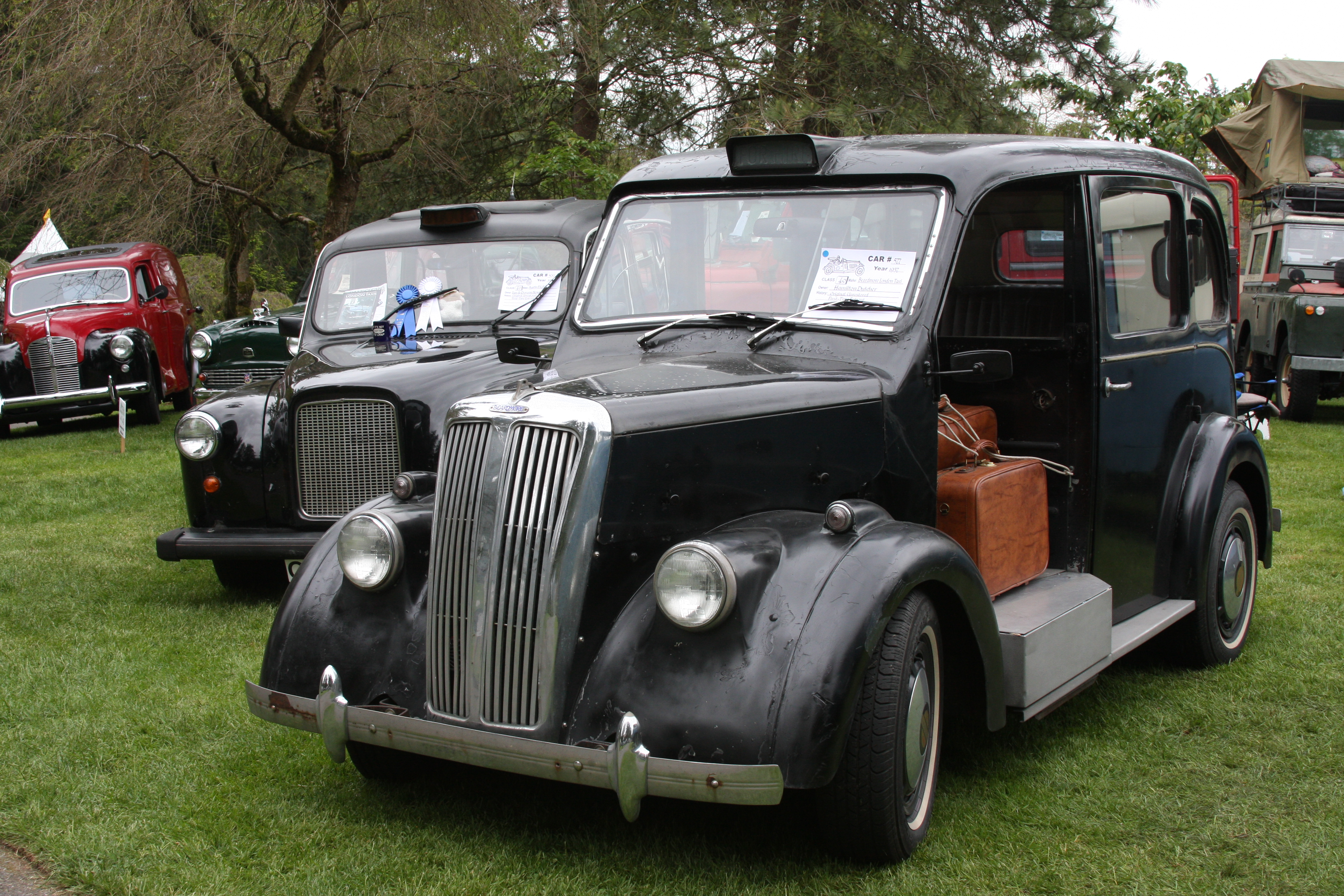
Until the late 1950s, vehicles licensed as London taxis were required to be provided with a luggage platform, open to the street, on the pavement (sidewalk) side, at the front, beside the driver, in place of the front passenger seat found on other passenger cars (including taxis licensed for use in other British cities).

Though there has never been law requiring London's taxis to be black, they were, since the end of the Second World War, sold in a standard colour of black. This, in the 1970s gave rise within the minicab trade to the nickname 'black cab' and it has become common currency. However, before the Second World War, London's cabs were seen in a variety of colours. They are produced in a variety of colours, sometimes in advertising brand liveries (see below). Fifty golden cabs were produced for the Queen's Golden Jubilee celebrations in 2002.

=== Vehicle design ===
In Edwardian times, Renault and Unic, but also smaller players like Charron and Darracq were to be found. Fiat was also a presence, with their importer d'Arcy Baker running a fleet of 400 cars of the brand. In the 1920s, Beardmore cabs were introduced and became for a while the most popular. They were nicknamed 'the Rolls-Royce of cabs' for their comfort and robustness. Maxwell Monson introduced Citroën cabs, which were cheaper, but crude in comparison to the Beardmore. In 1930 dealers Mann and Overton struck a deal with the Austin to bring a modified version of the Austin 12/4 car to the London taxi market. This established Austin as dominant until the end of the 1970s and Mann and Overton until 2012. The Austin FX4, launched in 1958, which stayed in production until 1997 under successive manufacturers is perhaps the most iconic and recognised of all hackney carriages and set the basic styling parameters of its successors.

Morrises cabs were also seen, in small numbers, but after the Second World War, produced the Oxford, made by Wolseleys.

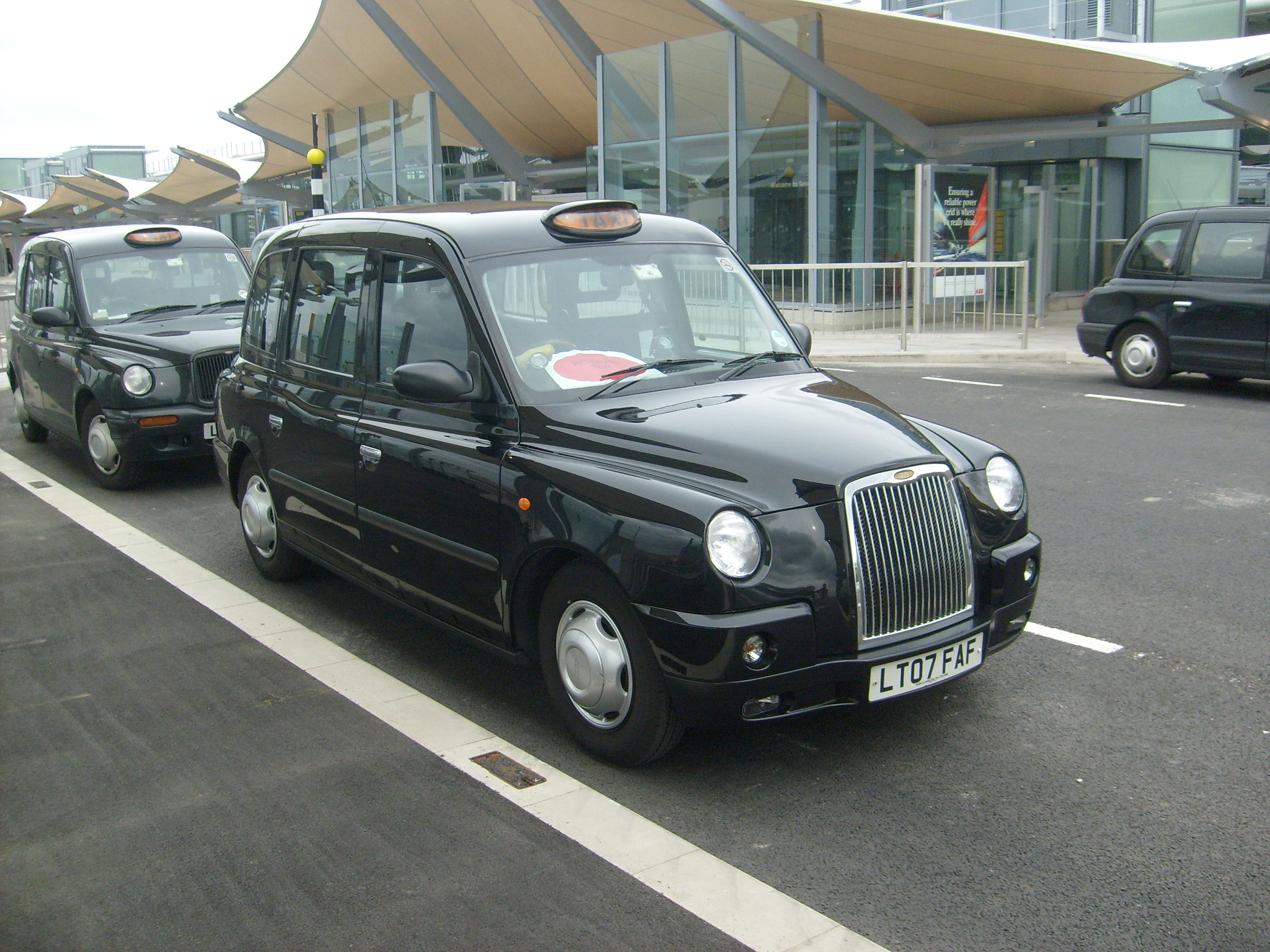
A TX4 hackney carriage at Heathrow Airport Terminal 5

Outside of London, the regulations governing the hackney cab trade are different. Four-door saloon cars have been highly popular as hackney carriages, but with disability regulations growing in strength and some councils offering free licensing for disabled-friendly vehicles, many operators are now opting for wheelchair-adapted taxis such as the LEVC TX of London Electric Vehicle Company (LEVC). London taxis have broad rear doors that open very wide (or slide), and an electrically controlled ramp that is extended for access.

Other models of specialist taxis include the Peugeot E7 and rivals from Fiat, Ford, Volkswagen, and Mercedes-Benz. These vehicles normally allow six or seven passengers, although some models can accommodate eight. Some of these minibus taxis include a front passenger seat next to the driver, while others reserve this space solely for luggage.

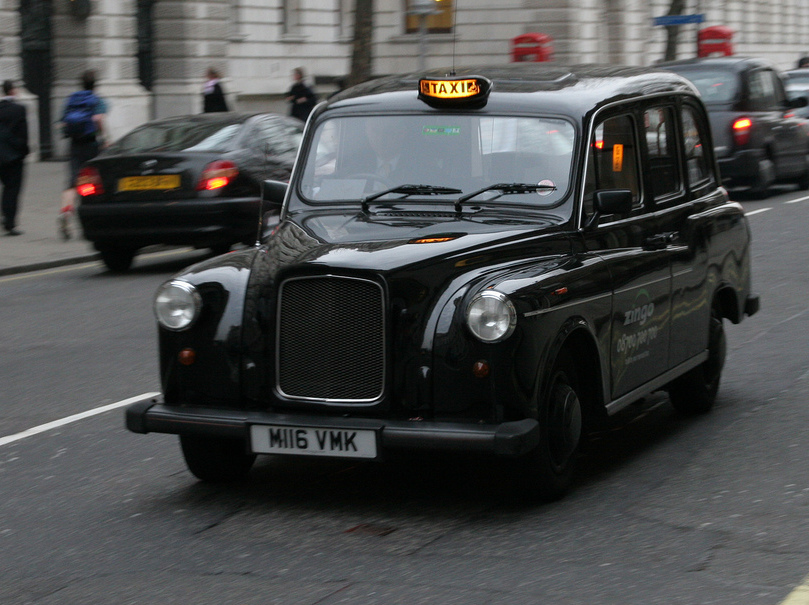
An FX4, made from 1958 to 1997. The for hire signage is a distinguishing feature of the hackney carriage.

London taxis must have a turning circle not greater than 8.535 m (28 ft). One reason for this is the configuration of the famed Savoy Hotel: the hotel entrance's small roundabout meant that vehicles needed the small turning circle to navigate it. That requirement became the legally required turning circles for all London cabs, while the custom of a passenger's sitting on the right, behind the driver, provided a reason for the right-hand traffic in Savoy Court, allowing hotel patrons to board and alight from the driver's side.

The design standards for London taxis are set out in the Conditions of Fitness, which are now published by Transport for London. The first edition was published in May 1906, by the Public Carriage Office, which was then part of the Metropolitan Police. These regulations set out the conditions under which a taxi may operate and have been updated over the years to keep pace with motor car development and legislation. Changes include regulating the taximeter (made compulsory in 1907), advertisements and the turning circle of 8.535 m (28 ft). Until the beginning of the 1980s, London Taxis were not allowed to carry any advertisements.

The London Taxis fleet has been fully accessible since 1 January 2000, following the introduction of the first accessible taxi in 1987. On 14 December 2010, Mayor of London Boris Johnson released an air quality strategy paper encouraging phasing out of the oldest of the LT cabs, and proposing a £1m fund to encourage taxi owners to upgrade to low-emission vehicles. Since 2018, all newly registered taxis in London must be zero emission, and as of December 2023 more than half of the 14,700 fleet is zero emission capable.

As part of the Transported by Design programme of activities, on 15 October 2015, after two months of public voting, the black cab was elected by Londoners as their favourite transport design icon.

In 2017, the LEVC TX was introduced – a purpose built hackney carriage, built as a plug-in hybrid range-extender electric vehicle. By April 2022, over 5,000 TX's had been sold in London, around a third of London's taxi fleet. In October 2019 the first fully electric cab since the Bersey in 1897, the Dynamo Taxi, was launched with a 187-mile range and with the bodywork based on Nissan's NV200 platform.

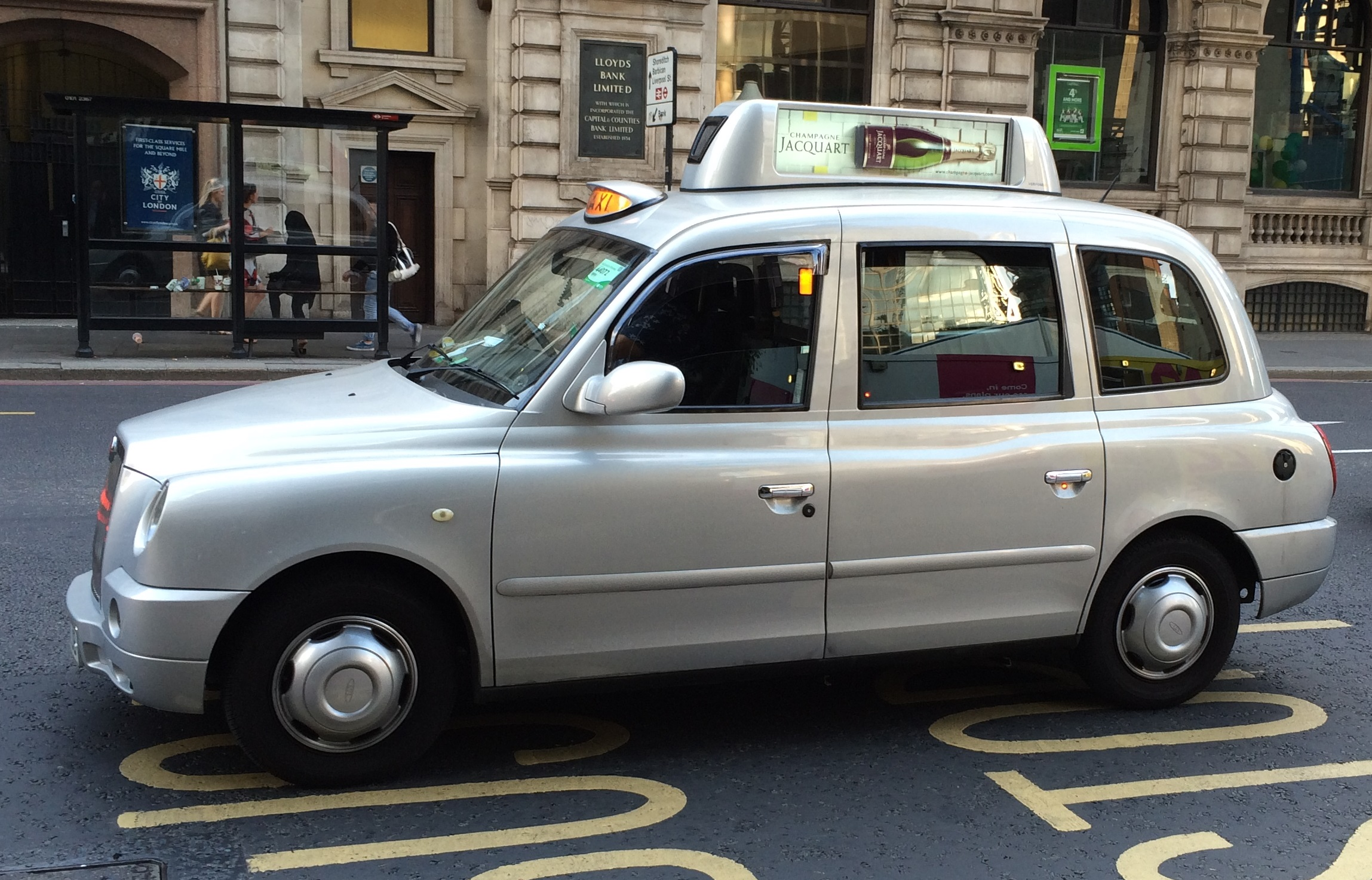
An example of an Eyetease digital screen on top of a hackney carriage

In October 2011 the company Eyetease Ltd. introduced digital screens on the roofs of London taxis for dynamically changing location-specific advertising.

=== Variety of models ===
There have been different makes and types of hackney cab through the years, including:

- Mann & Overton – including Carbodies, The London Taxi Company and currently London EV Company
  - Unic sold in London from 1906 to 1930s
  - Austin London Taxicab
  - Austin FX3
  - Austin/Carbodies/LTI FX4 and Fairway
  - LTI TX1, TXII and TX4
  - LEVC TX (plug-in hybrid range-extender)
- Mercedes-Benz
  - Vito W639
- Morris
  - Nuffield Oxford Taxi
- London General Cab Co.
  - Citroën
- Beardmore
  - Beardmore Marks I to VII
- Metrocab (originally formed by Metro Cammell Weymann)
  - MCW/Reliant/Hooper Metrocab
  - Ecotive Metrocab
- Dynamo Motor Company
  - Dynamo Taxi (Nissan NV200 based)

=== Notable private owners ===
Oil millionaire Nubar Gulbenkian owned an Austin FX3 Brougham Sedanca taxi, with custom coachwork by FLM Panelcraft Ltd as he was quoted "because it turns on a sixpence whatever that is." Gulbenkian had two such taxis built, the second of which was built on an FX4 chassis and was sold at auction by Bonhams for $39,600 in 2015. Other celebrities are known to have used hackney carriages both for their anonymity and their ruggedness and manoeuvrability in London traffic. Users included Prince Philip, whose cab was converted to run on liquefied petroleum gas, author and actor Stephen Fry, and the Sheriffs of the City of London. A black cab was used in the band Oasis's video for the song "Don't Look Back in Anger." Black cabs were used as recording studios for indie band performances and other performances in the Black Cab Sessions internet project.

Ghosthunting With... featured a black cab owned by host of the show, Yvette Fielding. Bez of the Happy Mondays owns one, shown on the UK edition of Pimp My Ride. Noel Edmonds used a black cab to commute from his home to the Deal or No Deal studios in Bristol. He placed a dressed mannequin in the back so that he could use special bus/taxi lanes, and so that people would not attempt to hail his cab.

The official car of the Governor of the Falkland Islands between 1976 and 2010 was a London taxi.

=== In other countries ===
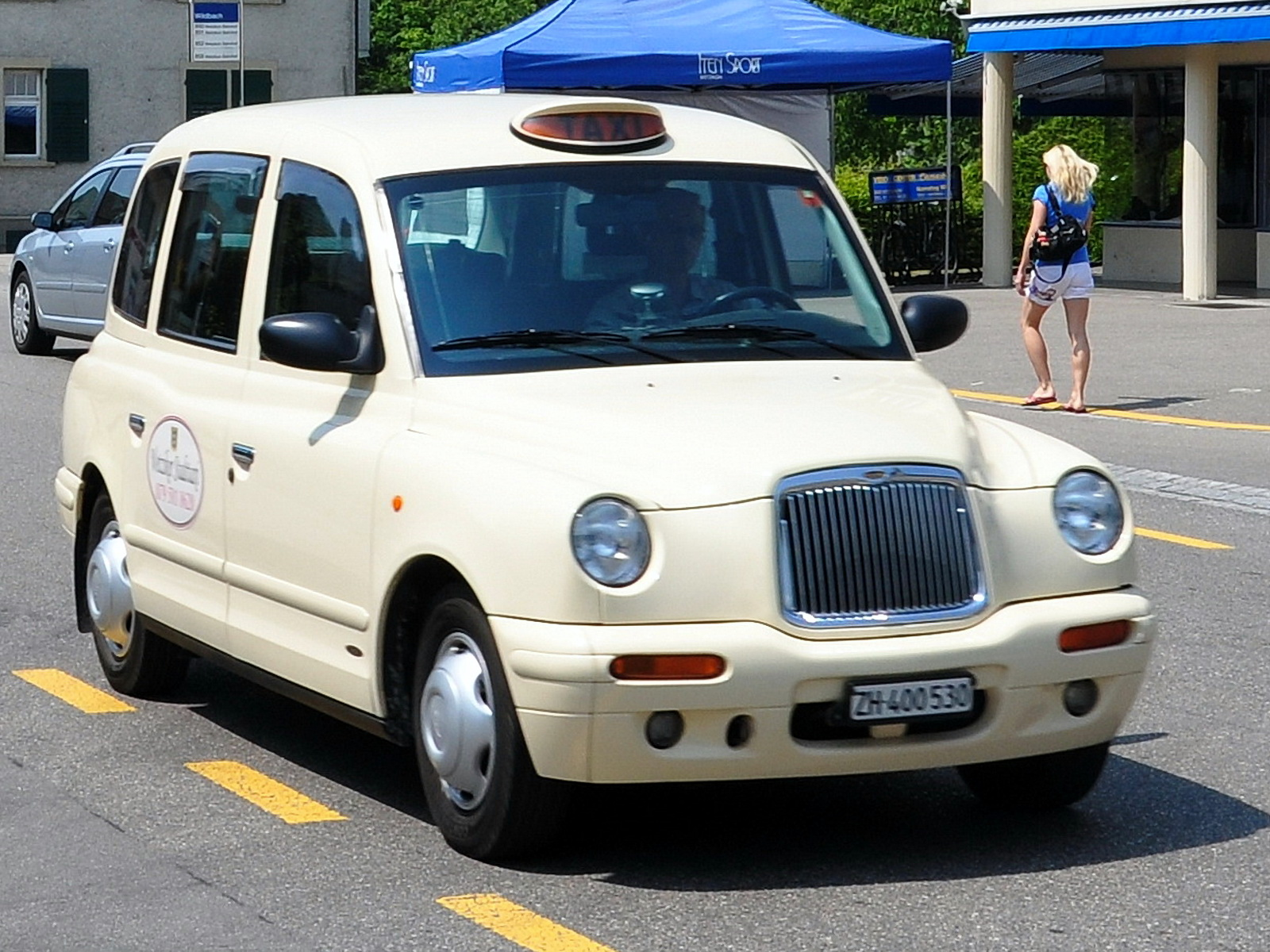
A London taxi (TXII model) in Switzerland

Between 2003 and 1 August 2009 the London taxi model TXII could be purchased in the United States. Today there are approximately 250 TXIIs in the US, operating as taxis in San Francisco, Dallas, Long Beach, Houston, New Orleans, Las Vegas, Newport, Rhode Island, Wilmington, North Carolina and Portland, Oregon. There are also a few operating in Ottawa, Ontario, Canada. The largest London taxi rental fleet in North America is in Wilmington, owned by The British Taxi Company. There are London cabs in Saudi Arabia, Romania, South Africa, Lebanon, Egypt, Bahrain and Cyprus, and in Israel, where a Chinese-made version of LTI's model TX4 built by Geely Automobile is available. In February 2010, a number of TX4s started operating in Pristina, Kosovo, and are known as London Taxi.

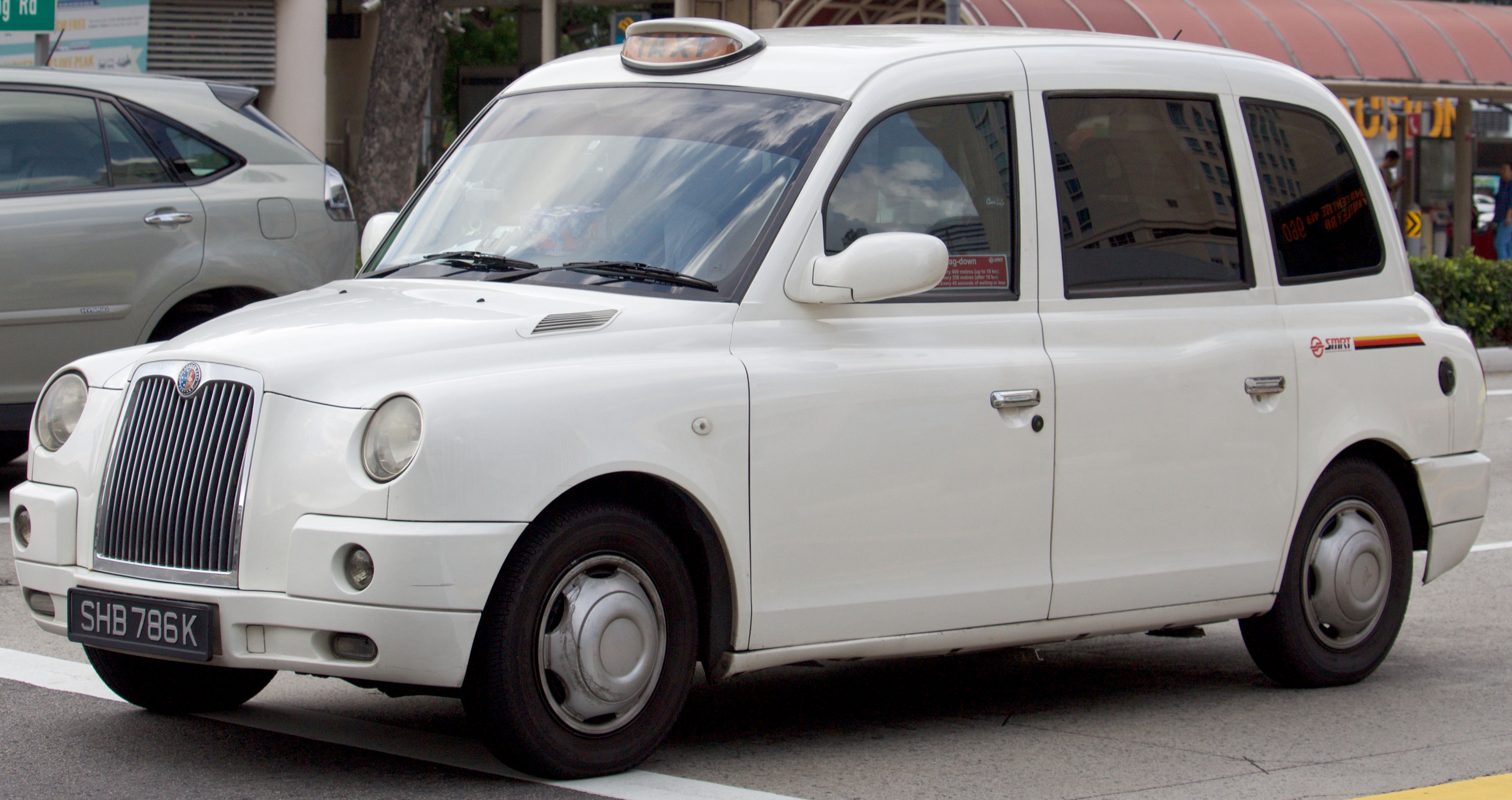
A London taxi (TX4 model) in Singapore

Singapore has used London-style cabs since 1992; starting with the "Fairway". The flag-down fares for the London Taxis are the same as for other taxis. SMRT Corporation, the sole operator, had by March 2013 replaced its fleet of 15 ageing multi-coloured (gold, pink, etc.) taxis with new white ones. They are the only wheelchair-accessible taxis in Singapore, and were brought back following an outcry after the removal of the service.

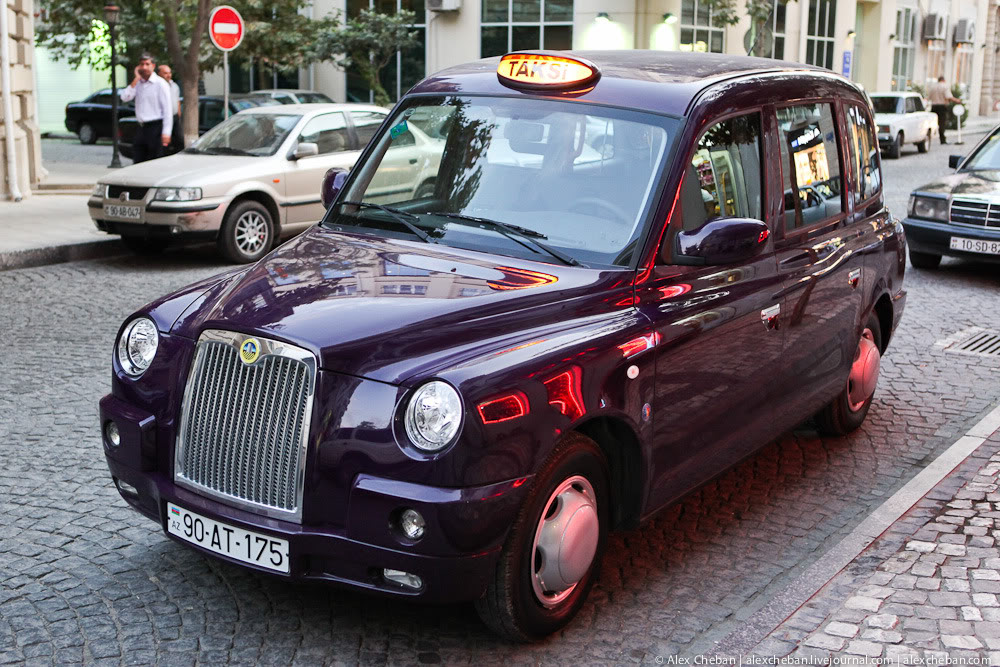
A London taxi (TX4 model) in Baku

By 2011 a thousand of a Chinese-made version of LTI's latest model, TX4, had been ordered by Baku Taxi Company. The plan is part of a program originally announced by Azerbaijan's Ministry of Transportation to introduce London cabs to the capital, Baku. The move was part of a £16 million agreement between the London Taxi Company and Baku Taxi Company.

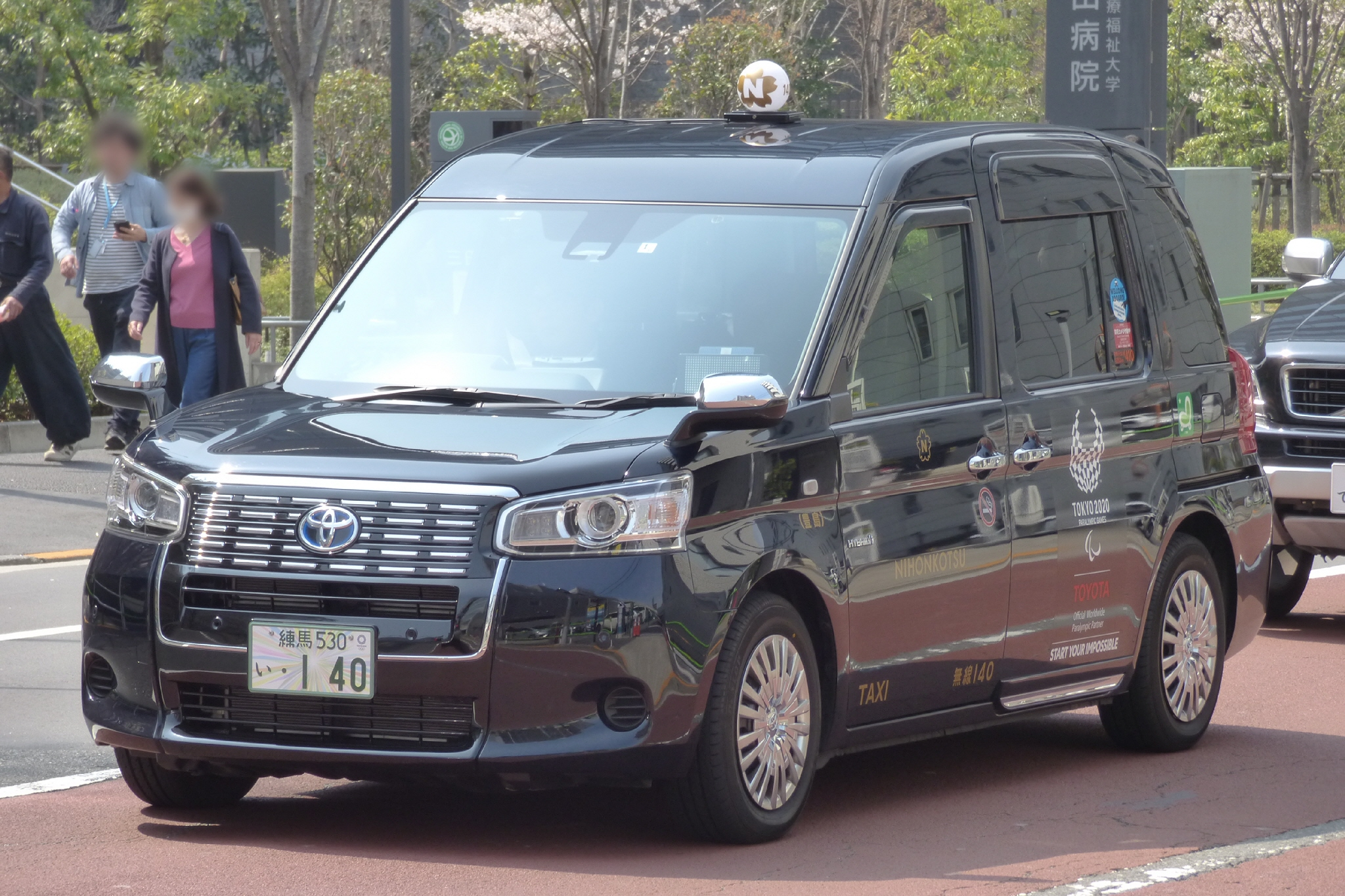
A Nihon Kotsu Toyota JPN Taxi

Although the LEVC TX is more expensive and exceeds the Japanese size classifications to gain the tax advantages Japanese livery drivers enjoy with the similarly designed but smaller Toyota JPN Taxi, Geely has attempted to break into the Japanese market. Alternatively, while the Toyota JPN Taxi does not meet the passenger capacity or turning radius Conditions of Fitness required by Transport for London, it does meet the emissions and accessibility requirements that may make it an ideal option for cities outside of London without the seating requirements or as a private hire vehicle while still evoking the familiar black cab profile.

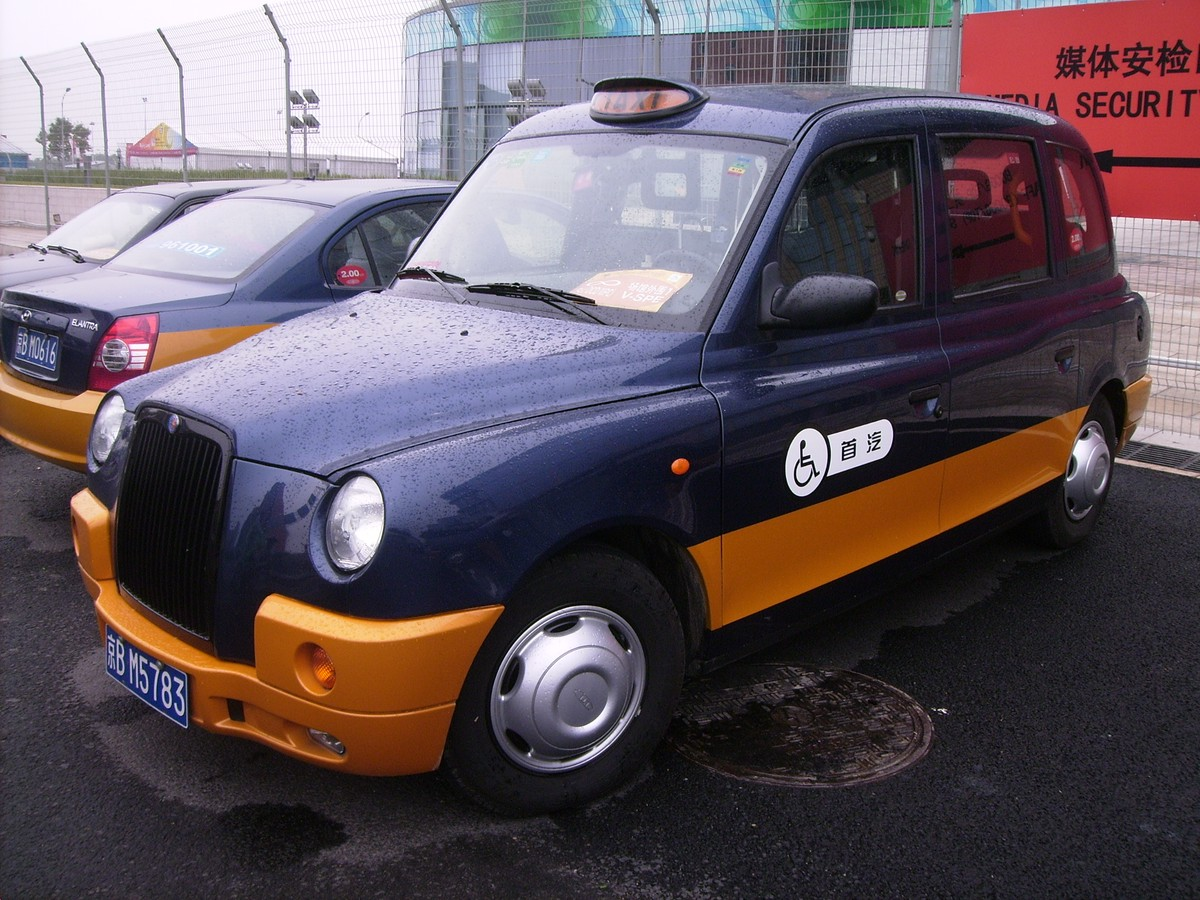
A London taxi in Beijing

During the 2008 Olympic Games, there were about 100 hackney carriages operating in Beijing.

== United Kingdom law ==
Laws about the definition, licensing and operation of hackney carriages have a long history. The most significant pieces of legislation by region are:

- In England and Wales: the Town Police Clauses Act 1847, and the Local Government (Miscellaneous Provisions) Act 1976. In Wales, responsibility for licensing is now devolved to the Senedd. In September 2017, a consultation started about the future of such licensing.
- In London: the Metropolitan Public Carriage Act 1869 and the London Cab Order 1934.
- In Scotland: the Civic Government (Scotland) Act 1982.
- In Northern Ireland: the Taxis Act (Northern Ireland) 2008

== See also ==
- Cabmen's Shelter Fund
- Cabvision
- Illegal taxi operation
- M4 bus lane
- Toyota JPN Taxi
- VPG Standard Taxi
- Wagon
- Black Cab Rapist, a driver of a black cab
