= Cabriolet (carriage) =

Light horse-drawn vehicle

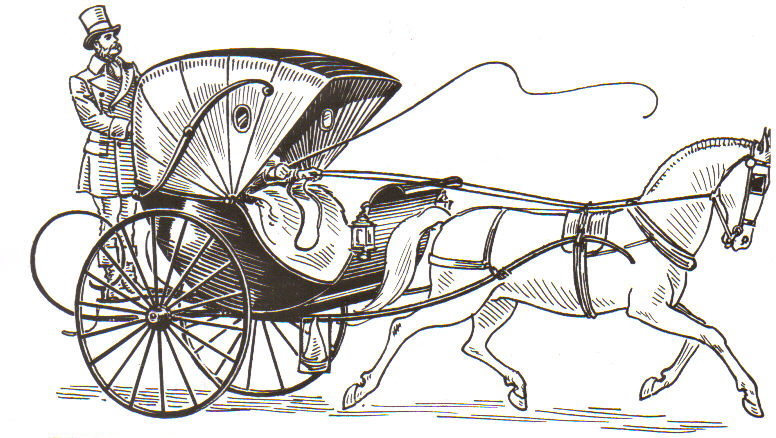
Cabriolet with groom on footboard behind the covered seats

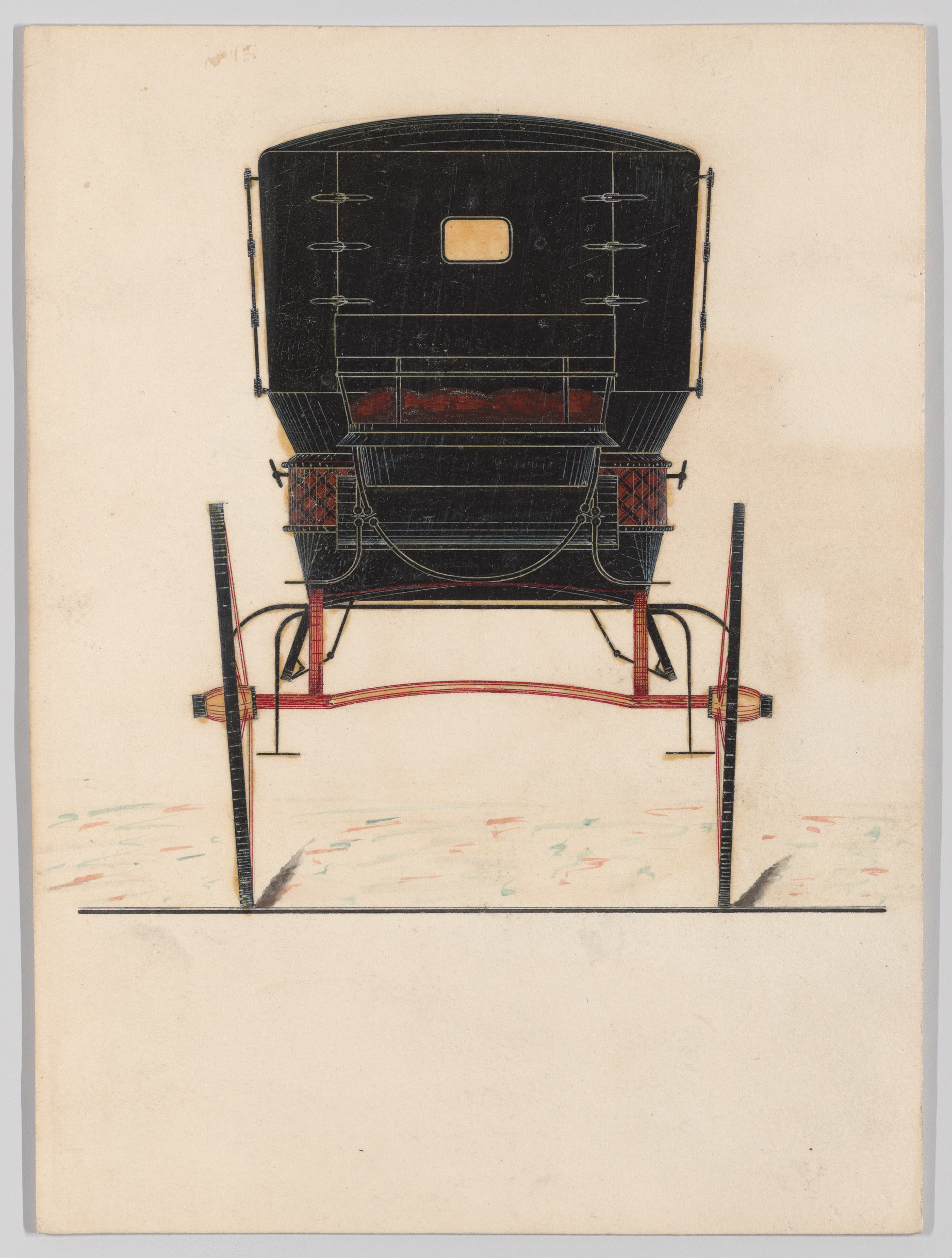
Rear view of design for cabriolet, 1875

A cabriolet (alternatively cabriole) is a light horse-drawn vehicle, with two wheels and a single horse. The carriage has a folding hood that can cover its two occupants, one of whom is the driver. It has a large rigid apron, upward-curving shafts, and usually a rear platform between the C springs for a groom. The design was developed in France in the eighteenth century and quickly replaced the heavier hackney carriage as the vehicle for hire of choice in Paris and London.

== Etymology ==
The word cabriolet is derived from the French version of the Italian capriolo, meaning a young goat, due to the swaying motion of the vehicle at speed suggestive of the skipping and capering of a kid.

The word cab is a shortening of cabriolet and occurs in compounds such as taxicab and hansom cab. A person who drives a cab is a cabdriver.

== History ==
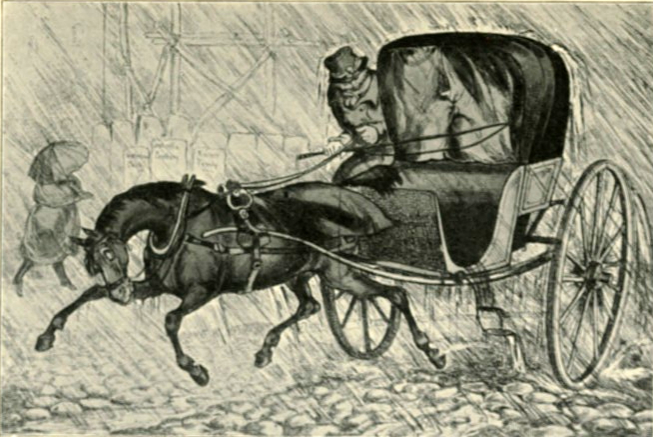
London cabbie shown driving from seat outside the cover of a cabriole, 1823

Imported from France to England in the 1790s, the cabriolet was originally a two-seater driven by its owner, with a platform on the rear for a groom to stand on. The vehicle soon came of interest to the hire-trade. Londoners had wanted a faster alternative to the slow, four-wheeled hackney carriages, but the hackney proprietors had an exclusive license to carry passengers in the center of London. In 1805, the first nine cabriolets were granted licenses to ply for hire, but only outside central London and with a limit of two persons, effectively restricting each cabriolet to a single passenger because the driver sat uncomfortably beside his fare. In 1823, 12 cabriolets were licensed and put into service with an awkward seat built off to one side for the driver—increasing the number of paying passengers to two.

Accidents were common because the drivers showed off their new-found speed and would occasionally collide with street posts or other vehicles, causing the passengers to be pitched forward into the road. Several attempts were made to ban the cabriolet as a safety hazard to other users of the roads. The next two-wheel cab to come into popularity was the Hansom cab, which had a lower center of gravity, thus a better safety record. Unlike the cabriolet, its driver sat outside the passenger compartment, behind and above the passengers on a raised seat. Hansoms gradually took over the hire-trade from the cabriolets.

== See also ==
- Cabriolet (automobile)
