= Carcraft (disambiguation) =

Carcraft was a group of used car hypermarkets.

Carcraft may also refer to:

- Waymo Carcraft, a virtual driving simulator
- Car Craft, a magazine devoted to automobiles, hot rodding, and drag racing

== See also ==
- Carcroft, a place in England
- Cracraft, a surname
