= Automotive industry in the United Kingdom =

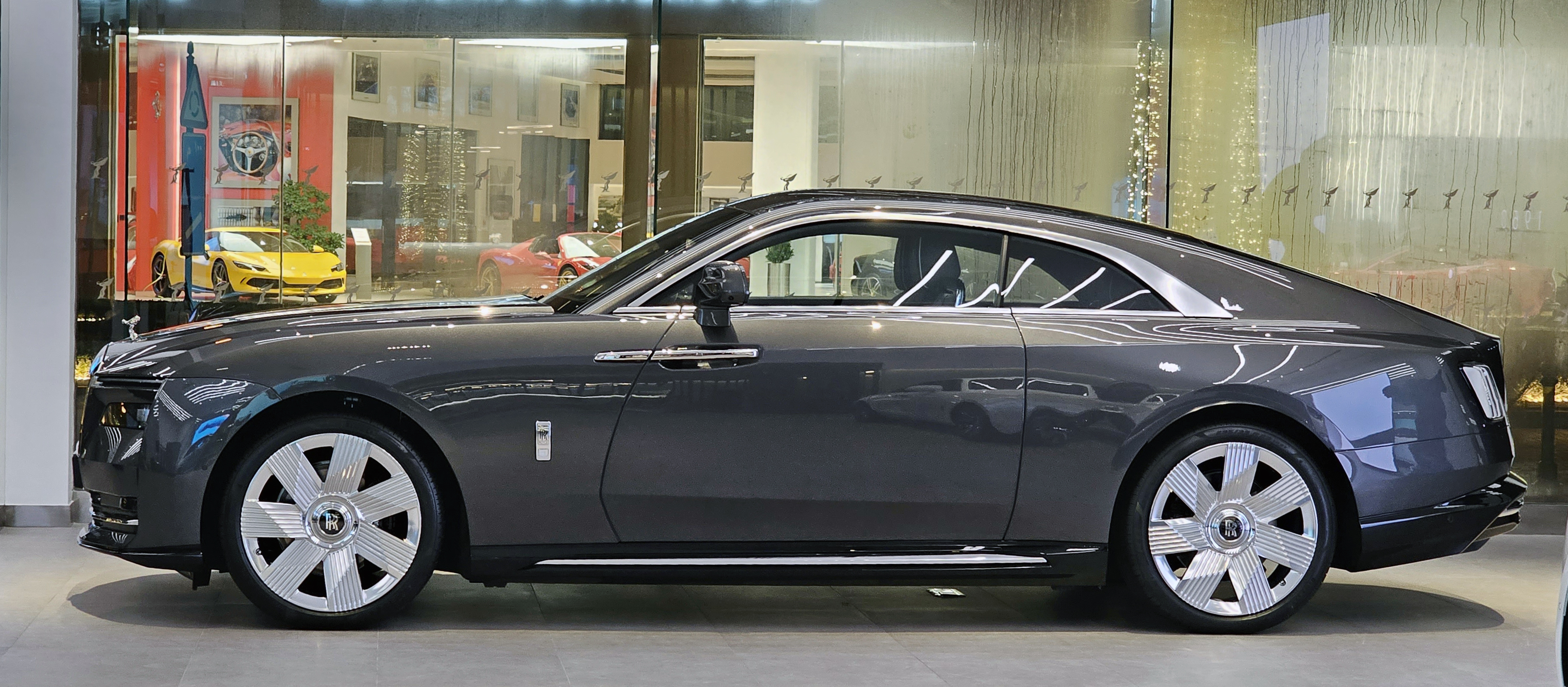
Rolls-Royce Spectre, produced from 2023-present

The automotive industry in the United Kingdom is now best known for premium and sports car marques including: Aston Martin, McLaren, Bentley, Rolls-Royce, Jaguar, Land Rover, Mini and Lotus. (Note: Car brands here are classed as British based on several of the following criteria: historical heritage, cultural significance, design and engineering base, manufacturing location, headquarters location, UK registered company (even with overseas investors).) Specialised sports car companies include: Ariel, BAC, Morgan, Caterham, AC Cars, Gordan Murray, TVR, Noble, Radical, Ginetta, Ultima Sports, Westfield, Lister, Arash and David Brown. Volume car manufacturers in the UK include Nissan, Toyota and MINI. British commercial vehicle brands active in the UK include Alexander Dennis, Dennis Eagle, IBC Vehicles, Leyland Trucks and the London Electric Vehicle Company.

In 2024 the UK automotive manufacturing sector had a turnover of £92 billion, generated £25 billion in value to the UK economy and produced around 779,584 passenger vehicles and 125,649 commercial vehicles. In that year around 183,000 people were directly employed in automotive manufacturing in the UK, with a further 796,000 people employed in automotive supply, retail and servicing.

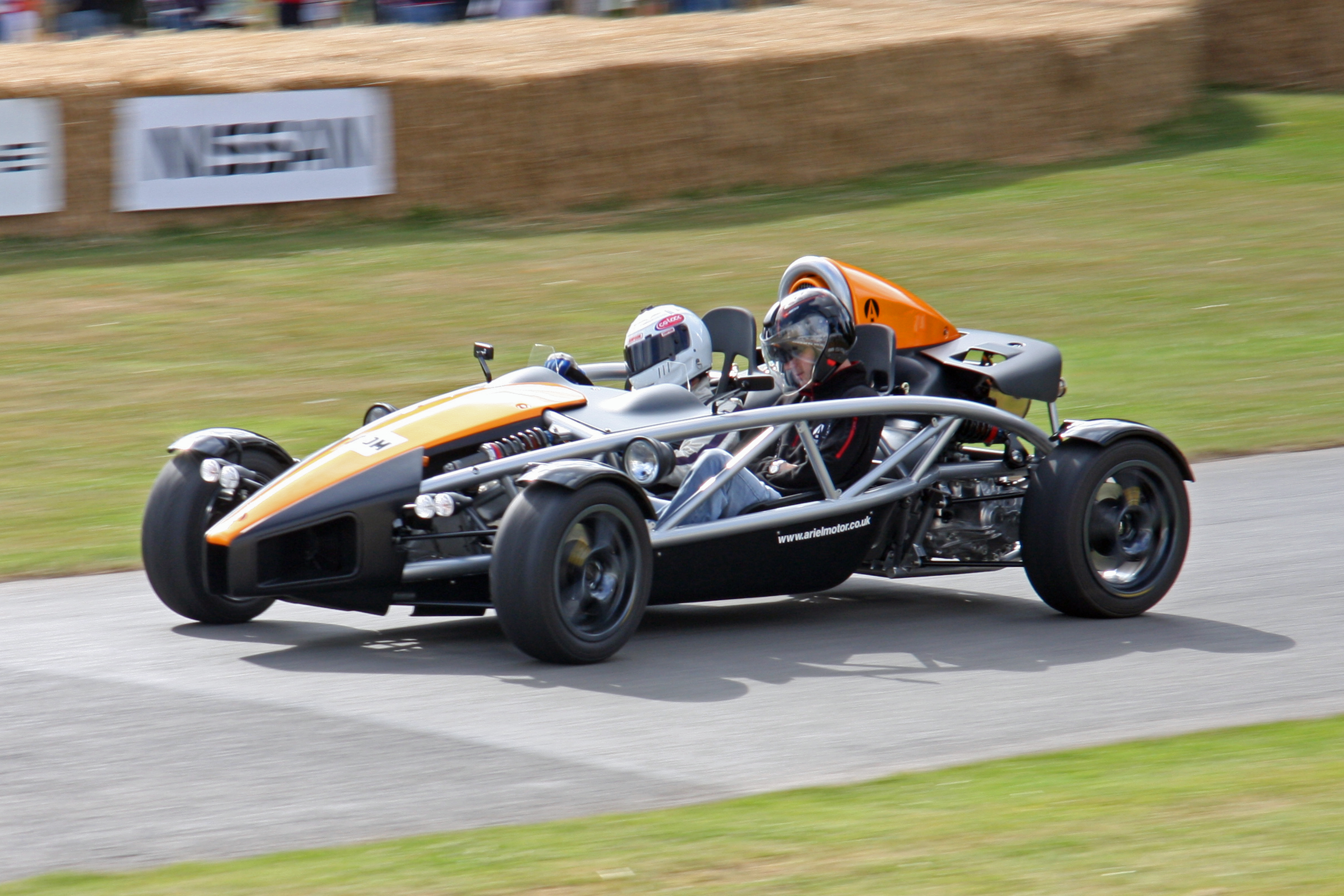
Ariel Atom, produced from 2000-present

The UK has been a major centre for engine manufacturing, and in 2024 around 1.58 million engines were produced in the country, though the sector has been declining in the recent decades. The UK has a significant presence in auto racing and the UK motorsport industry currently employs around 38,500 people, comprises around 4,500 companies and has an annual turnover of around £6 billion. The overwhelming majority of new cars sold in the UK are manufactured abroad; the majority are manufactured in Europe, a rapidly growing share is manufactured in China, while smaller shares are manufactured in Japan and South Korea.

The origins of the UK automotive industry date back to the final years of the 19th century. By the 1950s, the UK was the second-largest manufacturer of cars in the world (after the United States), and the largest exporter. However, in subsequent decades the industry experienced considerably lower growth than competitor nations such as France, Germany and Japan, and by 2008 the UK was the 12th-largest producer of cars measured by volume. Since the early 1990s, many British car marques have been invested in by international companies including BMW (Mini and Rolls-Royce), Tata (Jaguar and Land Rover) and Volkswagen Group (Bentley).

Famous and iconic British cars include the Aston Martin DB5, Aston Martin V8 Vantage, Bentley 4½ Litre, Jaguar E-Type, Land Rover Defender, Lotus Esprit, McLaren F1, MGB, original two-door Mini, Range Rover, Rolls-Royce Phantom III and Rover P5. Notable British car designers include David Bache, Dick Burzi, Laurence Pomeroy, John Polwhele Blatchley, Ian Callum, Colin Chapman, Alec Issigonis, Charles Spencer King and Gordon Murray.

== History ==
=== 1880 to 1900 ===
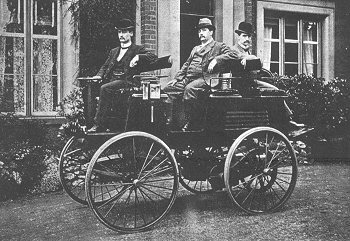
Thomas Parker produced the first electric car in 1884.

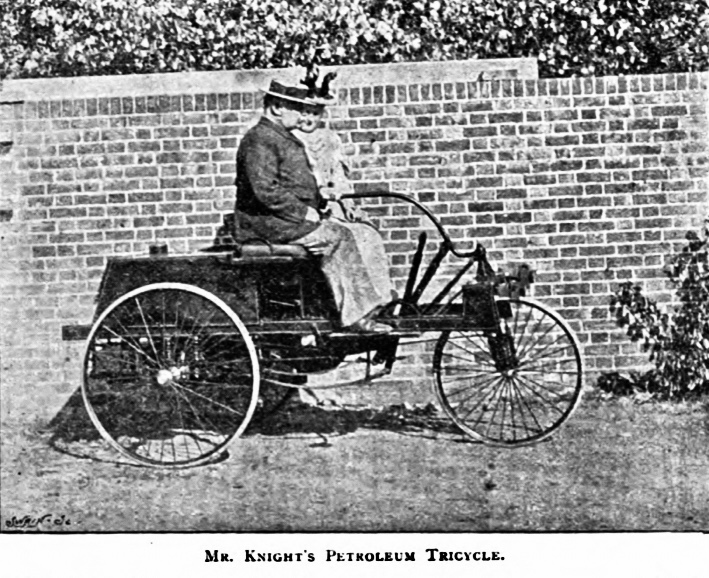
John Henry Knight (1895)

The inception of the British motor industry can be traced back to the mid-1880s when there were several key developments. One development was when Frederick Simms, a London-based consulting engineer, became friends with Gottlieb Daimler, who had, in 1885, patented a successful design for a high-speed petrol engine. Simms acquired the British rights to Daimler's engine and associated patents and from 1891 successfully sold launches using these Cannstatt-made motors from Eel Pie Island in the Thames. In 1893 he formed The Daimler Motor Syndicate Limited for his various Daimler-related enterprises.

In June 1895, Simms and his friend Evelyn Ellis promoted motor cars in the United Kingdom. Ellis had a left-hand-drive Daimler-engined Panhard & Levassor made for him and had it shipped to Southampton. It was transported by rail to Micheldever and he drove it 56 miles to his home in Datchet in July 1895. The police did not trouble him, just as they did not trouble other early motorists who were members of the aristocracy or the political class.

Simms' documented plans to manufacture Daimler motors and Daimler Motor Carriages (in Cheltenham) were taken over, together with his company and its Daimler licences, by London company-promoter H J Lawson. Lawson contracted to buy The Daimler Motor Syndicate Limited and all its rights and on 14 January 1896 formed and in February successfully floated in London The Daimler Motor Company Limited. It then purchased from a friend of Lawson a disused cotton mill in Coventry for car engine and chassis manufacture where, it is claimed, the UK's first serial production car was made.

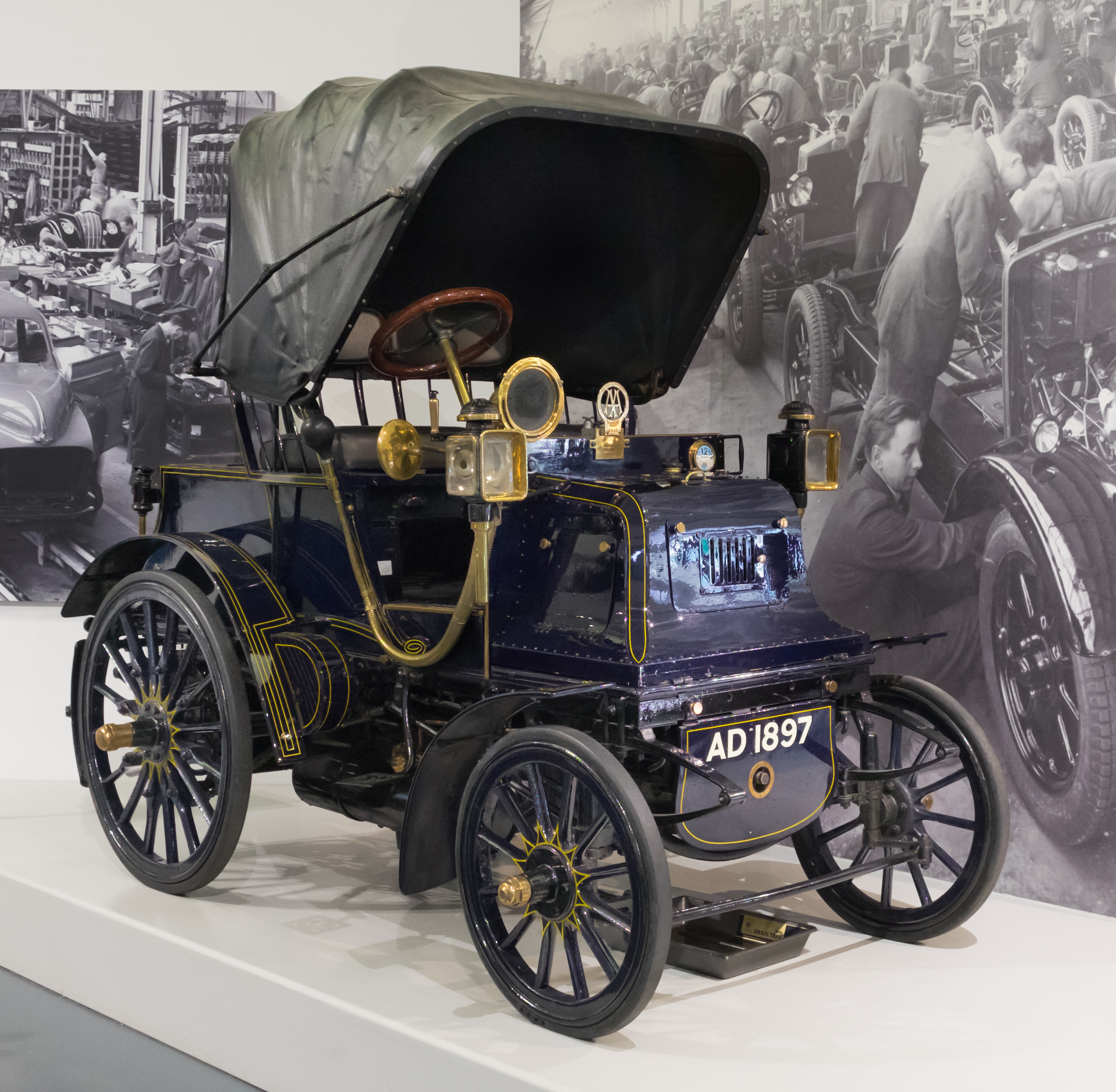
1897 Daimler Grafton Phaeton

George Lanchester produced one of the first British cars between 1895 and 1896 having a single-cylinder 1306cc engine, he went on to sell the first car with disc brakes. In 1891 Richard Stephens, a mining engineer from South Wales, returned from a commission in Michigan to establish a bicycle works in Clevedon, Somerset. Whilst in the United States, he had seen the developments in motive power and by 1897 he had produced his first car. This was entirely of his own design and manufacture, including the two-cylinder engine, apart from the wheels which he bought from Starley in Coventry. This was probably the first all-British car and Stephens set up a production line, manufacturing in all, twelve vehicles, including four- and six-seater cars and hackneys, and nine-seater buses.

Early motor vehicle development in the UK had been effectively stopped by a series of Locomotive Acts introduced during the 19th century which severely restricted the use of mechanically propelled vehicles on the public highways. Following intense advocacy by motor vehicle enthusiasts, including Harry J. Lawson of Daimler, the worst restrictions of these acts, (the need for each vehicle to be accompanied by a crew of three, and a 2 mph (3.2 km/h) speed limit in towns), was lifted by the Locomotives on Highways Act 1896. Under this regulation, light locomotives (those vehicles under 3 tons unladen weight) were exempt from the previous restrictions, and a higher speed limit – 14 mph (23 km/h) was set for them. To celebrate the new freedoms Lawson organised the Emancipation Run held on 14 November 1896, the day the new Act came into force. This occasion has been commemorated since 1927 by the annual London to Brighton Veteran Car Run.

=== 1900 to 1939 ===
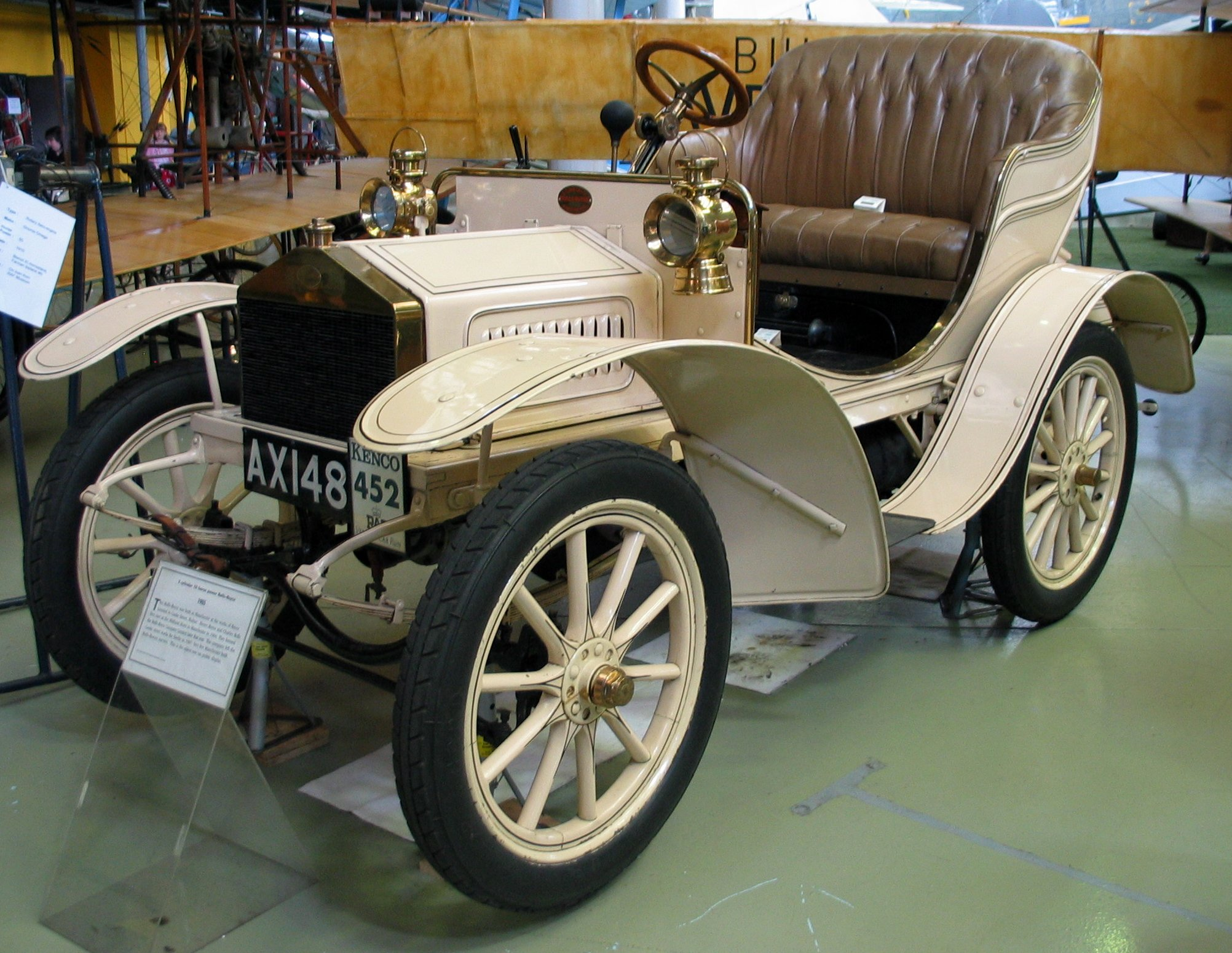
Rolls-Royce 10 hp, produced from 1904-1906

The early British vehicles of the late-nineteenth century relied mainly upon developments from Germany and France. By 1900 however, the first all-British 4-wheel car had been designed and built by Herbert Austin as manager of The Wolseley Sheep Shearing Machine Company. In 1901, backed by (Vickers Limited) brothers 'Colonel Tom' and Albert Vickers [la], Austin started what became Wolseley Motors in Birmingham and was the UK's largest car manufacturer until Ford overtook them in 1913.

The great bulk of the pioneering car producers, many of them from the bicycle industry, got off to a shaky start. Of the 200 British makes of car that had been launched up until 1913, only about 100 of the firms were still in existence. In 1910, UK vehicle production was 14,000 units. By 1913, Henry Ford had built a new factory in Manchester and was the leading UK carmaker, building 7,310 cars that year, followed by Wolseley at 3,000, Humber (making cars since 1898 in Coventry) at 2,500, Rover (Coventry car maker since 1904) at 1,800 and Sunbeam (producing cars since 1901) at 1,700, with the plethora of smaller producers bringing the 1913 total up to about 16,000 vehicles. Car production virtually came to an end during the war years 1914–1918, although the requirements of war production led to the development of new mass-production techniques in the motor industry.

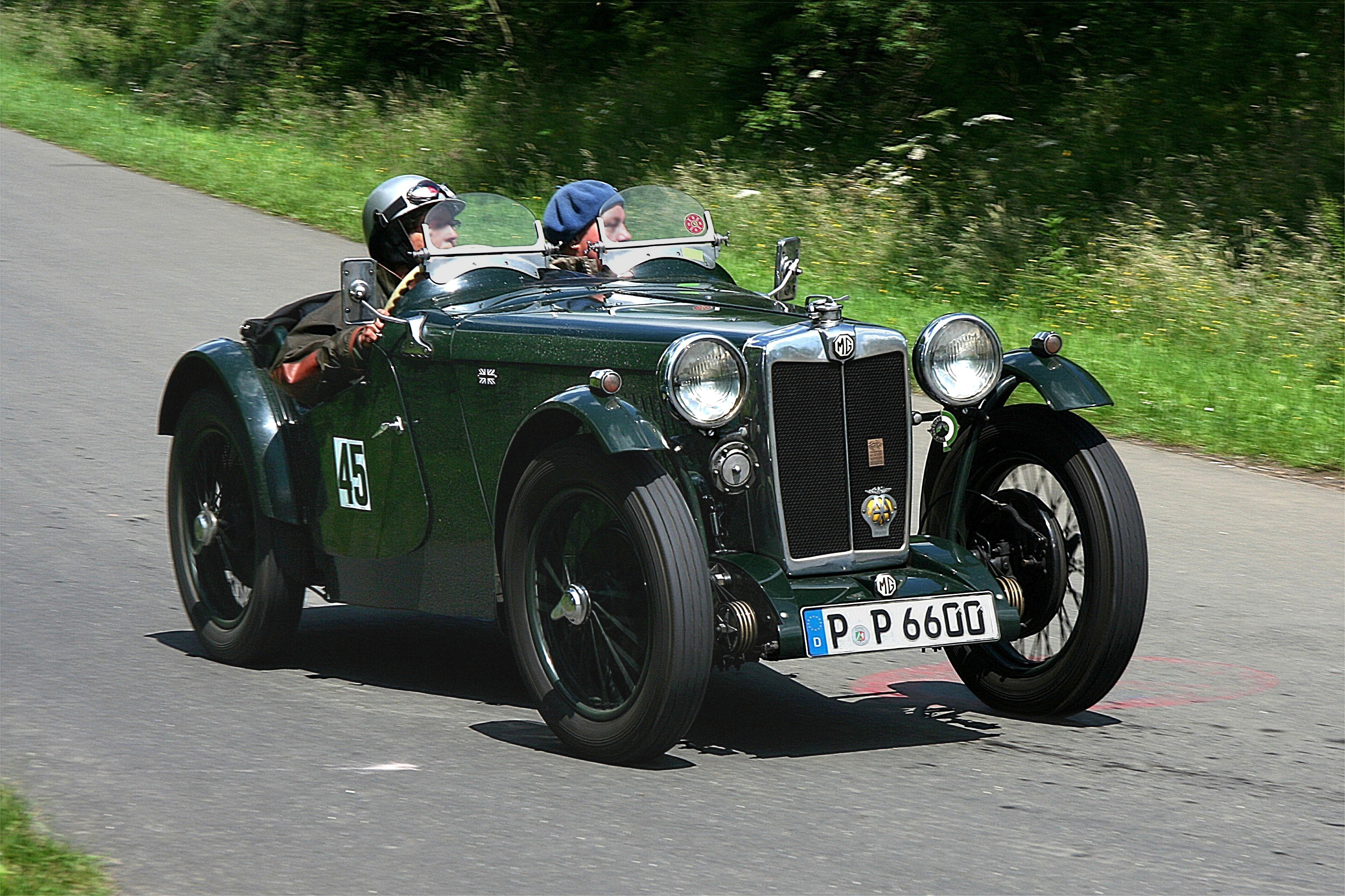
A 1934 MG PA

By 1922, there were 183 motor companies in the UK, and by 1929, following the slump years, there were 58 companies remaining. In 1929, production was dominated by Morris (founded by William Morris in 1910 in Oxford) and Austin (founded by Herbert Austin in Birmingham in 1905 after he left Wolseley) which between them produced around 60% of total UK output. Singer (Coventry motorcycle manufacturer started building cars in 1905) followed in third place that year with 15% of production.

In 1932, the UK overtook France to become Europe's largest car producer (a position which it retained until 1955). In 1937, the UK produced 379,310 passenger cars and 113,946 commercial vehicles. To celebrate the granting of his peerage, William Morris upon becoming Viscount Nuffield, reorganised his motor vehicle companies in 1938, which by then included not only Morris Motors and MG, but also Wolseley and Riley (bicycle company founded in Coventry in 1890 and making cars since 1906), into the Nuffield Organization. In 1939, the top producers were Morris: 27%, Austin: 24%, Ford: 15%, Standard (founded in Coventry in 1903): 13%, Rootes (which had acquired Humber and Sunbeam): 11%, Vauxhall (building cars since 1903, acquired by GM in 1925): 10%.

=== 1939 to 1955 ===
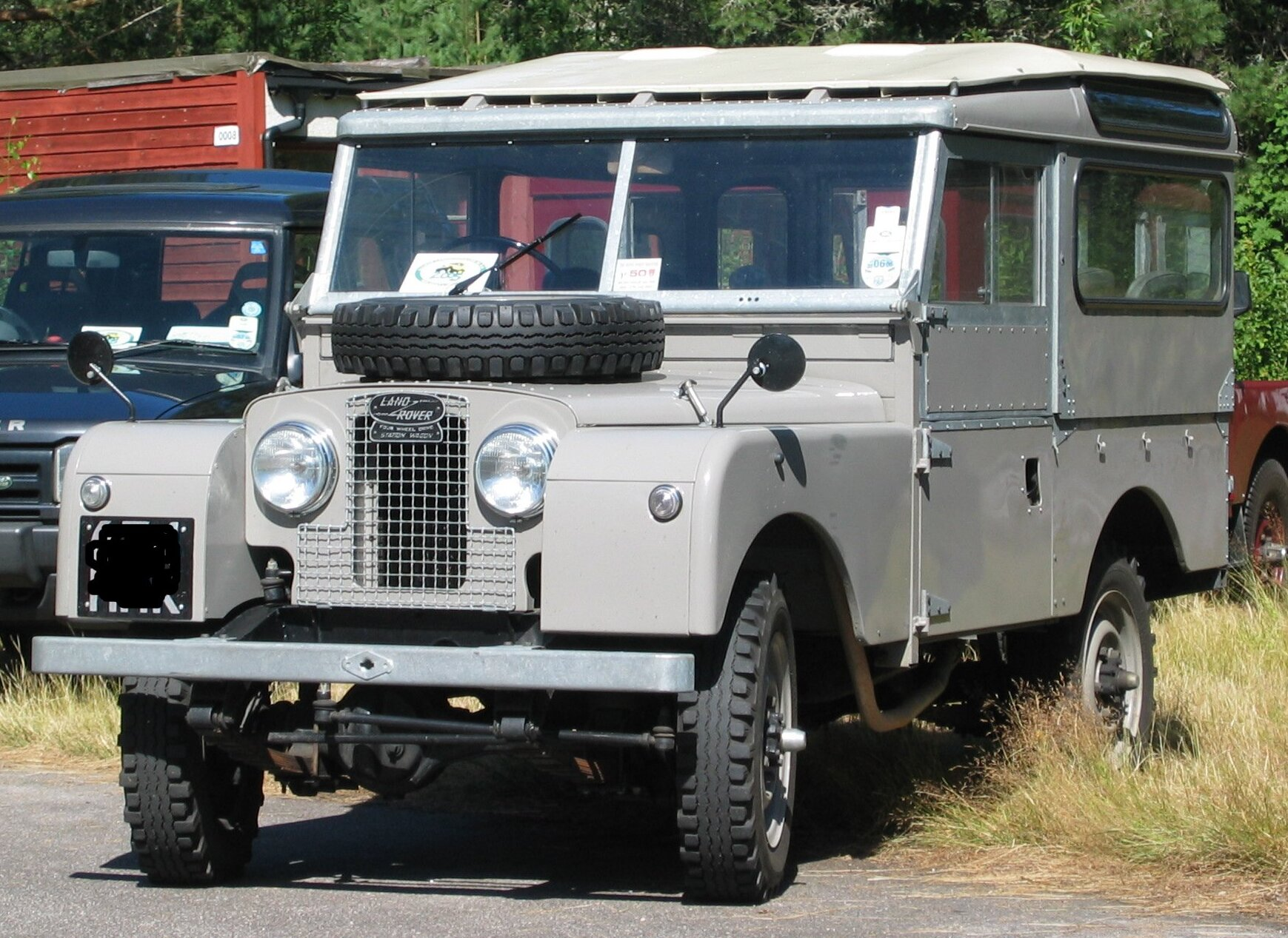
The Land Rover Series I, introduced in 1948

During the Second World War, car production in the UK gave way to commercial and military vehicle production, and many motor vehicle plants were converted to aircraft and aero engine production. Following the war, the UK Government had nationalised the steel industry; where priority was given to supplying foreign-revenue-raising export businesses. In 1947, steel was available only to businesses which exported at least 75% of their production. This, coupled with the inevitably limited competition from continental Europe, and with demand for new vehicles in America and in Australia being greater than the American industry alone could supply, resulted in British vehicle exports reaching record levels and the UK became the world's largest motor vehicle exporter. In 1937, the UK provided 15% of world vehicle exports. By 1950, a year in which 75% of British car production and 60% of its commercial vehicle production was exported, the UK provided 52% of the world's exported vehicles.

This situation remained until the mid-1950s, by which time the American industry production had caught up with American demand, and European production was recovering. By 1952, the American-owned producers in the UK (Ford and GM's Vauxhall) had between them a 29% share of the British market, which exceeded the share of either of the UK's two top domestically owned manufacturers. It was in that context that Viscount Nuffield agreed to the merger of his company, the Nuffield Organization, with Austin, to form the British Motor Corporation (BMC). Thus BMC, comprising Austin, Morris, MG, Riley and Wolseley was formed in 1952 and commanded a 40% share of the British market. German production was increasing yearly, and by 1953 it had exceeded that of France, and by 1956 it had overtaken that of the UK.

=== 1955 to 1968 ===
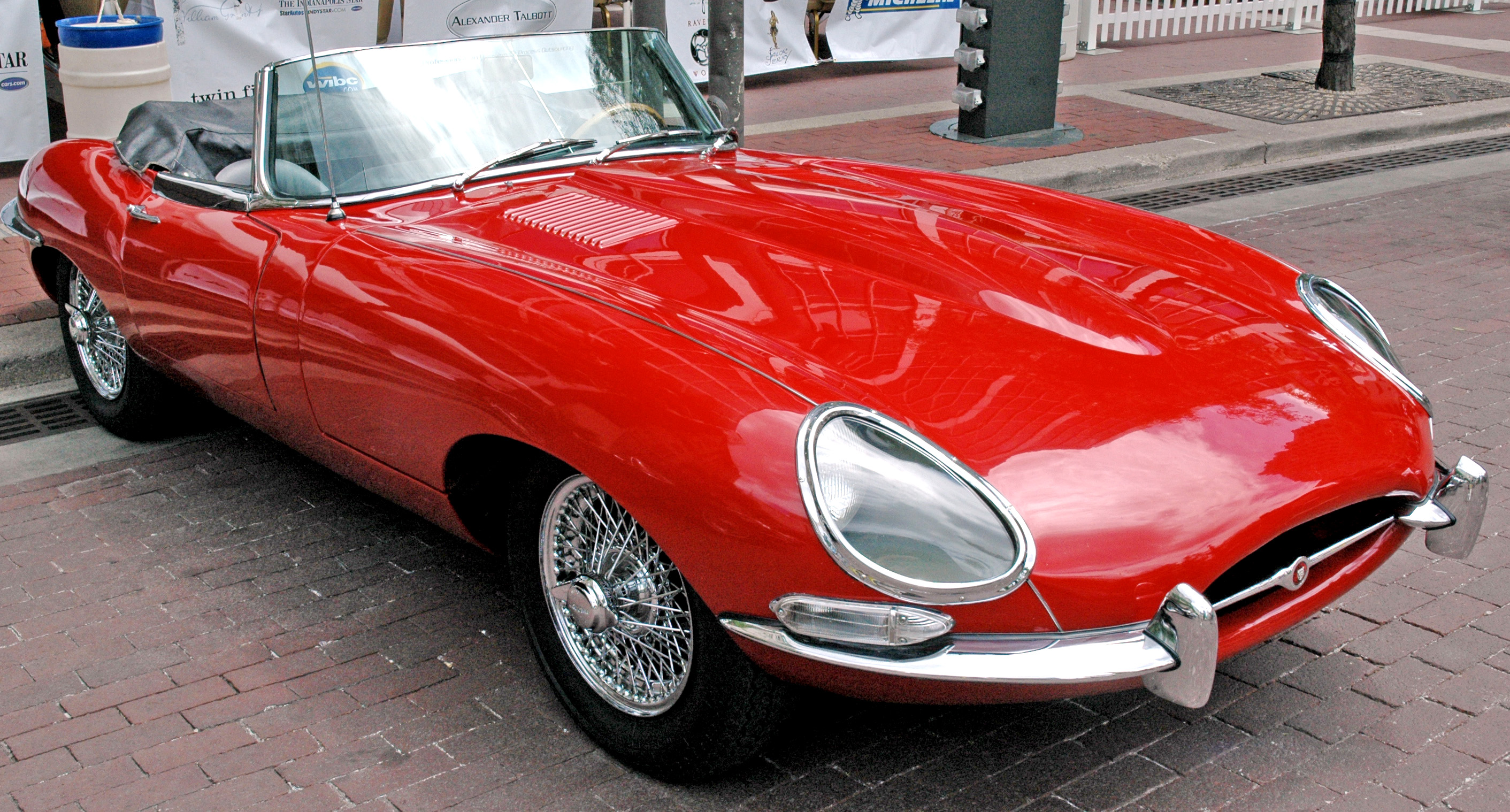
Jaguar E-type (introduced 1961)

By 1955 five companies produced 90% of the UK's motor vehicle output: BMC, Ford, Rootes, Standard-Triumph and Vauxhall. Of the dozen or so smaller producers Rover and Jaguar were strong niche producers. By 1960 the UK had dropped from being the world's second largest motor vehicle producer into third place. Labour-intensive methods, and wide model ranges hindered opportunities to reduce manufacturing costs – the UK's unit costs were higher than those of their major Japanese, European and American competitors. Although rationalisation of motor vehicle companies had started, full integration did not occur. BMC continued to produce vehicles under the marque names of its incorporated companies, many of which competed with each other. Standard-Triumph's attempts to reduce costs by embracing a modern volume production strategy almost led to their bankruptcy in 1960, the result was that they were purchased by the commercial vehicle manufacturing company Leyland Motors. In 1966, BMC and Jaguar came together, to form British Motor Holdings (BMH). Leyland had achieved some sales success with Leyland-Triumph and in 1967 it acquired Rover. By 1966 the UK had slipped to become the world's fourth largest motor vehicle producer. Following a gradual process which had begun in 1964, Chrysler UK (CUK) had fully acquired Rootes by 1967.

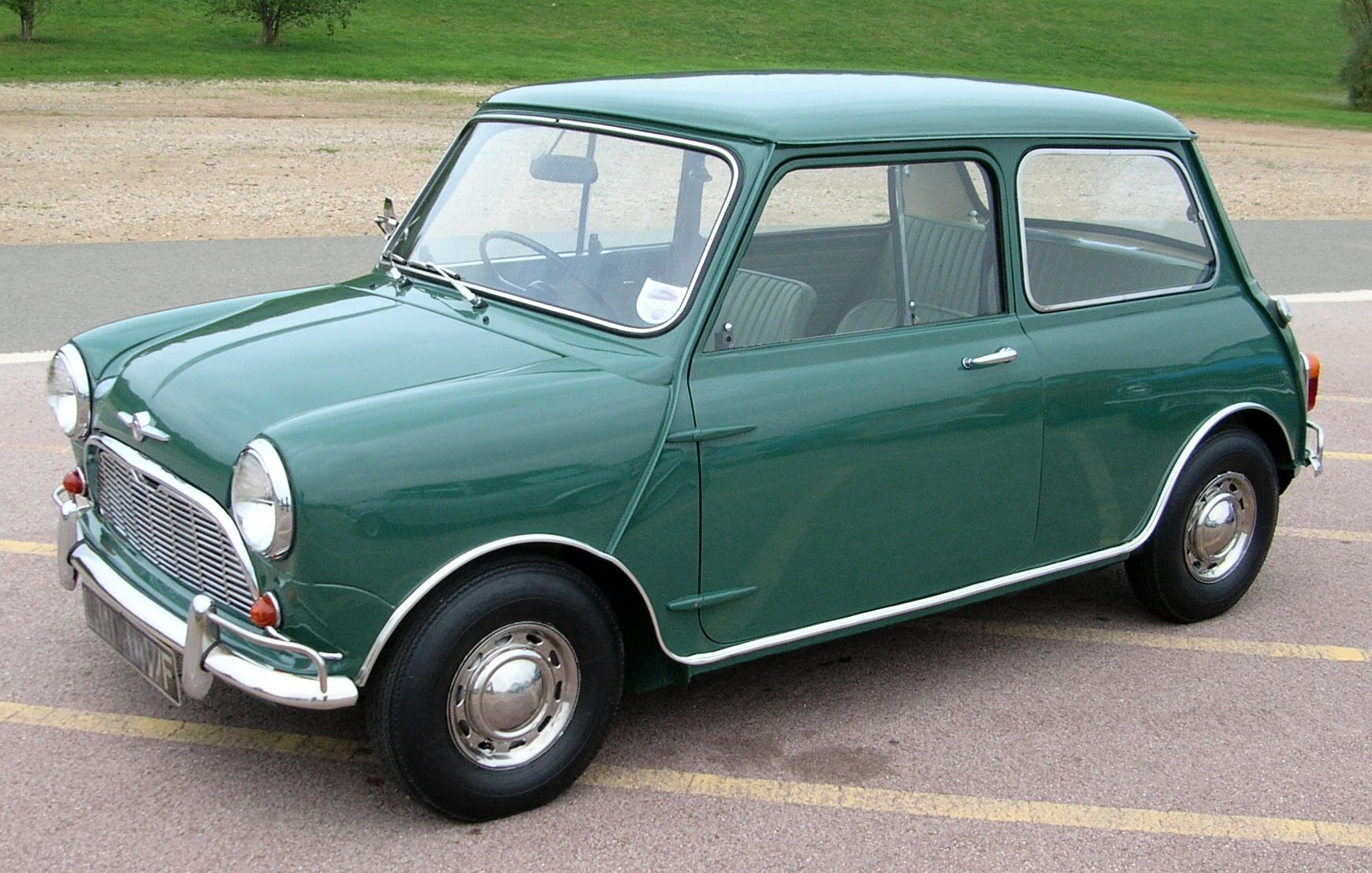
1967 Mini (introduced 1959)

In the context of BMC's wide, complex, and expensive-to-produce model range, Ford's conventionally designed Cortina challenging for the number one spot in the domestic market, and the heavy reliance of the British economy on motor vehicle production, in 1968 the Government brokered the merger of the successful Leyland-Triumph-Rover and the struggling BMH, to form Europe's fourth-largest car maker, the British Leyland Motor Corporation (BLMC). The new company announced its intention to invest in a new volume car range, and to equip its factories with the latest capital-intensive production methods.

BMC's Mini, designed by Alec Issigonis, had revolutionized the small car market in 1959, and the car remained among the UK's best selling cars for more than 20 years after its launch, the last version finally rolling off the production line on 4 October 2000 after a run of 41 years. The Rootes Group launched the similar-sized Hillman Imp four years later, but by the end of the 1960s Ford and Vauxhall had yet to launch a comparable product, and even with foreign imports slowly starting to gain ground on the British market, Italy's Fiat 500 was one of the few comparable alternatives to the virtual monopoly of the Mini and Hillman Imp in this sector of the market.

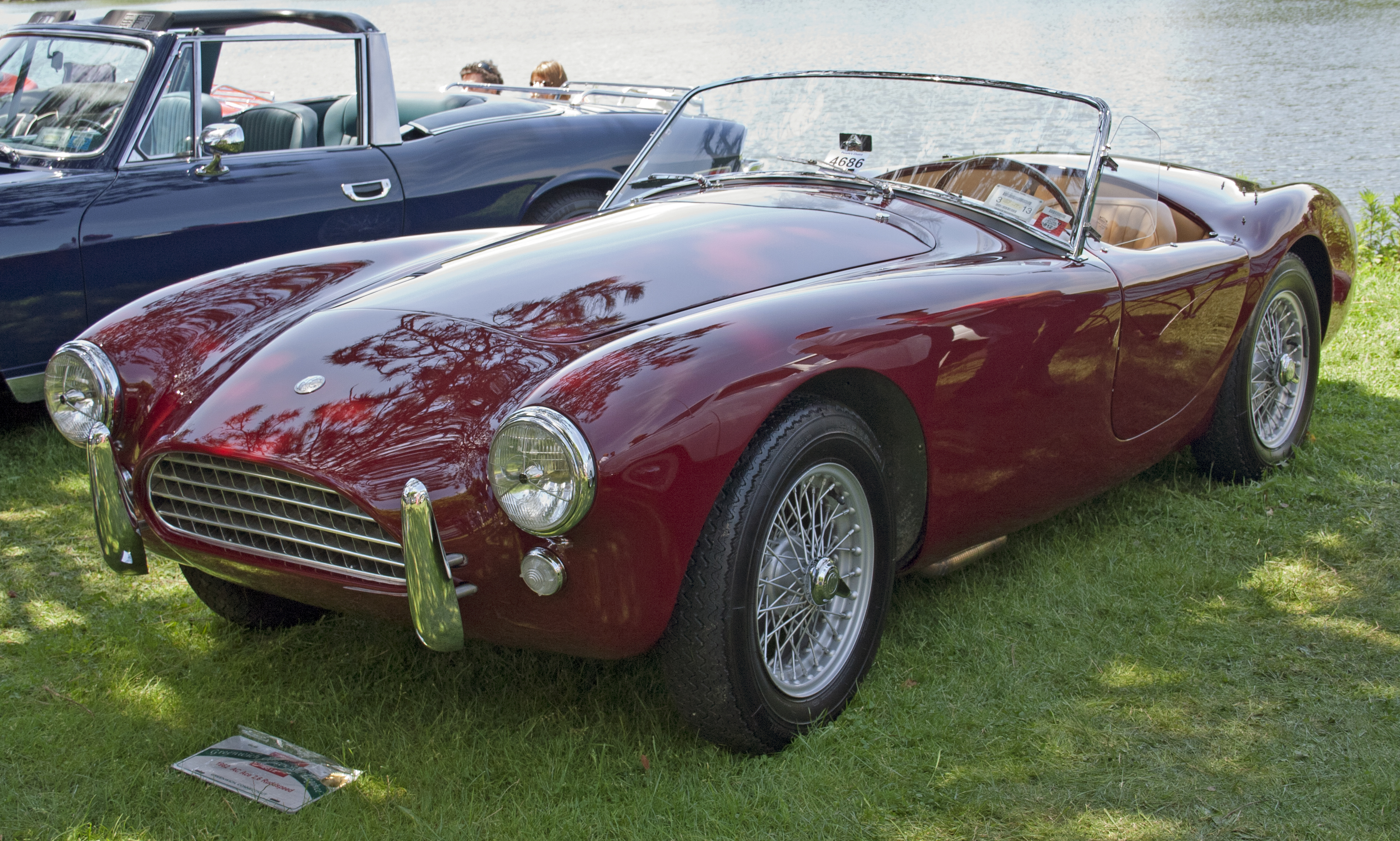
1962 AC Ace, produced 1953-1963

Also designed by Alec Issigonis was the Morris Minor, which was heavily updated in 1956 having originally gone into production in 1948. It earned a reputation for low running costs, good reliability and competitive pricing, and continued to sell well throughout the 1960s in spite of the popularity of BMC's 1100/1300 range which was launched in 1962, The Morris Minor was also the first British car to reach one million in production in 1961 with this record number reached a special model of the Morris Minor was created and sent to all of the main dealerships under the name "Morris Million".

Ford's competitor in this sector was the Anglia, which featured unconventional styling but was still one of the country's most successful cars from its launch in 1959 up to the end of production in 1967, after which it was replaced by the Escort. Other British competitors in this sector were the Vauxhall Viva and Hillman Minx.

Larger family cars enjoyed strong sales in the 1960s, namely the Ford Cortina (launched in 1962), Austin/Morris 1800 (1964) and Vauxhall Victor (1957). Later in the 1960s, the Rootes Group launched a new competitor in this growing sector of the market - the Hillman Hunter.

The Rover P6, launched in 1963 and the first winner of the European Car of the Year award, was arguably the most popular luxury model in the UK during the 1960s.

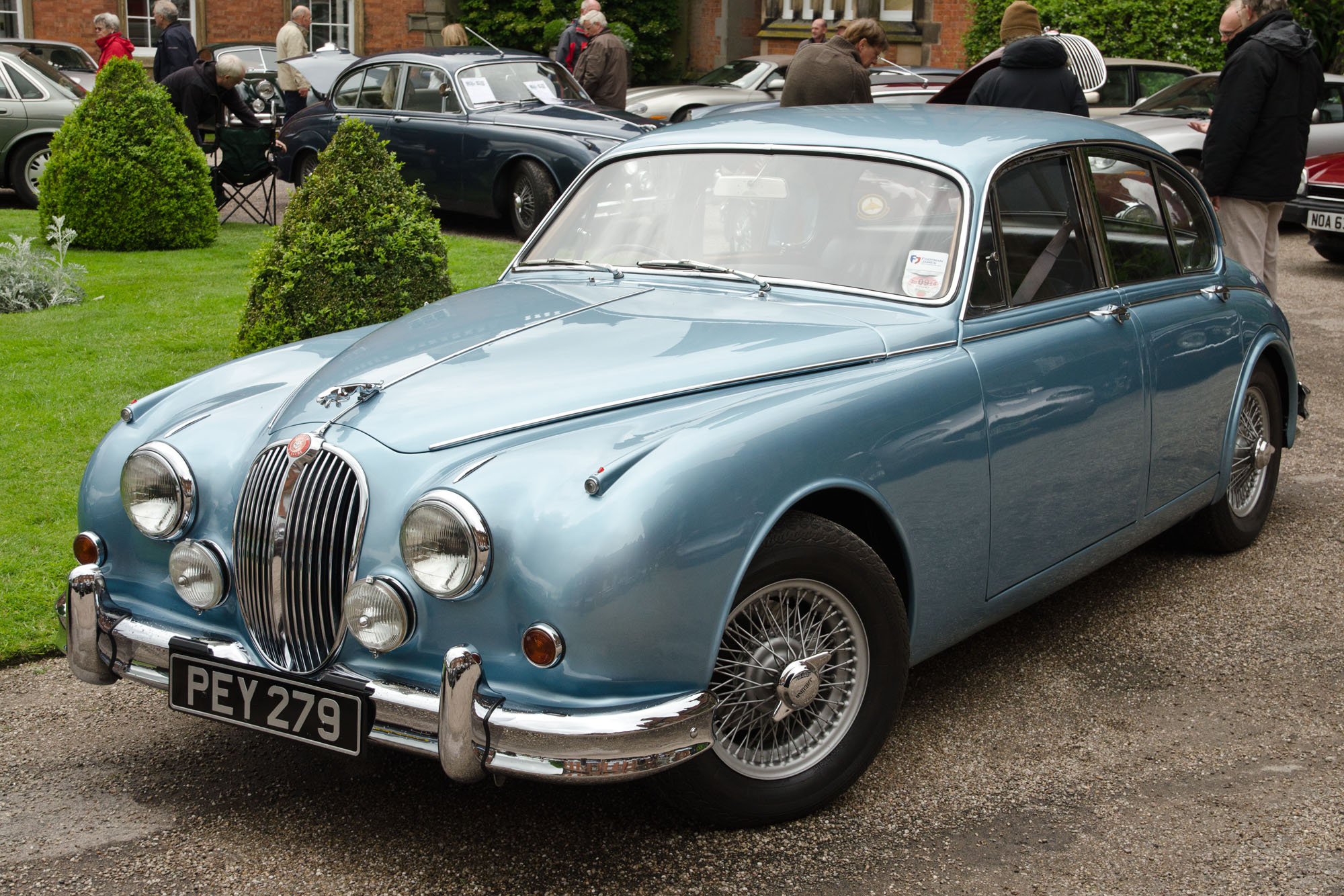
1966 Jaguar Mk 2, produced 1959-1967

The iconic Jaguar E-Type sports car, designed by Malcolm Sayer, with a top speed of 145 miles per hour (233 km/h) and the choice of a coupe or roadster bodystyle, was launched in 1961 and would remain in production until 1975. Cheaper sports cars also enjoyed strong sales during the 1960s, including the MG B and Triumph Spitfire which were launched in the early part of the decade, and the Ford Capri which was launched just before the decade's end.

The 1960s saw a slow but sure increase in the popularity of foreign cars on the British market. Volkswagen of West Germany had imported the iconic Beetle to Britain since 1953; this car was first launched in 1937 as a "people's car" for the German market under the Nazi regime. Its arrival on the UK market less than a decade after the end of World War II was met with hostility, with many examples being vandalised soon after being distributed, but it quickly became popular, with nearly 10,000 being sold in 1959. Volkswagen also began importing examples of its people carrier and van models, and by 1963 had sold 100,000 cars in Britain. Renault of France had actually built UK market versions of its cars at a site in Acton, West London, from 1902 until 1962, but its popularity actually increased after the end of UK production, helped by the arrival of the Renault 4 minicar in 1961 and the world's first production hatchback model, the Renault 16, in 1965. By the end of the decade, it had launched a smaller hatchback model, the Renault 6, and a mid-range saloon, the Renault 12, and was continuing to grow in popularity. Renault's French rival Peugeot also enjoyed success in the 1960s with its 404 saloon and even more so with its successor, the 504, which was launched in 1968. This set the scene for even more sales for foreign carmakers on the UK market during the next two decades, as their market share continued to grow.

Japanese cars also started to appear on the UK market during the 1960s, although they were a rare on British roads until exploding in popularity during the early 1970s. The Daihatsu Compagno was the first Japanese car to be sold in Britain when imports began during 1964. This car was not popular with British buyers and was withdrawn from sale within a few years, although Daihatsu would return to the UK market in the early 1980s. A year later, Toyota became the second Japanese carmaker to import cars to Britain. It was followed shortly afterwards by Nissan (which used the Datsun brand for the UK market) and Mazda. Honda was also enjoying great success on the motorcycle market by this stage, although it didn't start importing passenger cars to the UK until 1972.

=== 1968 to 1987 ===
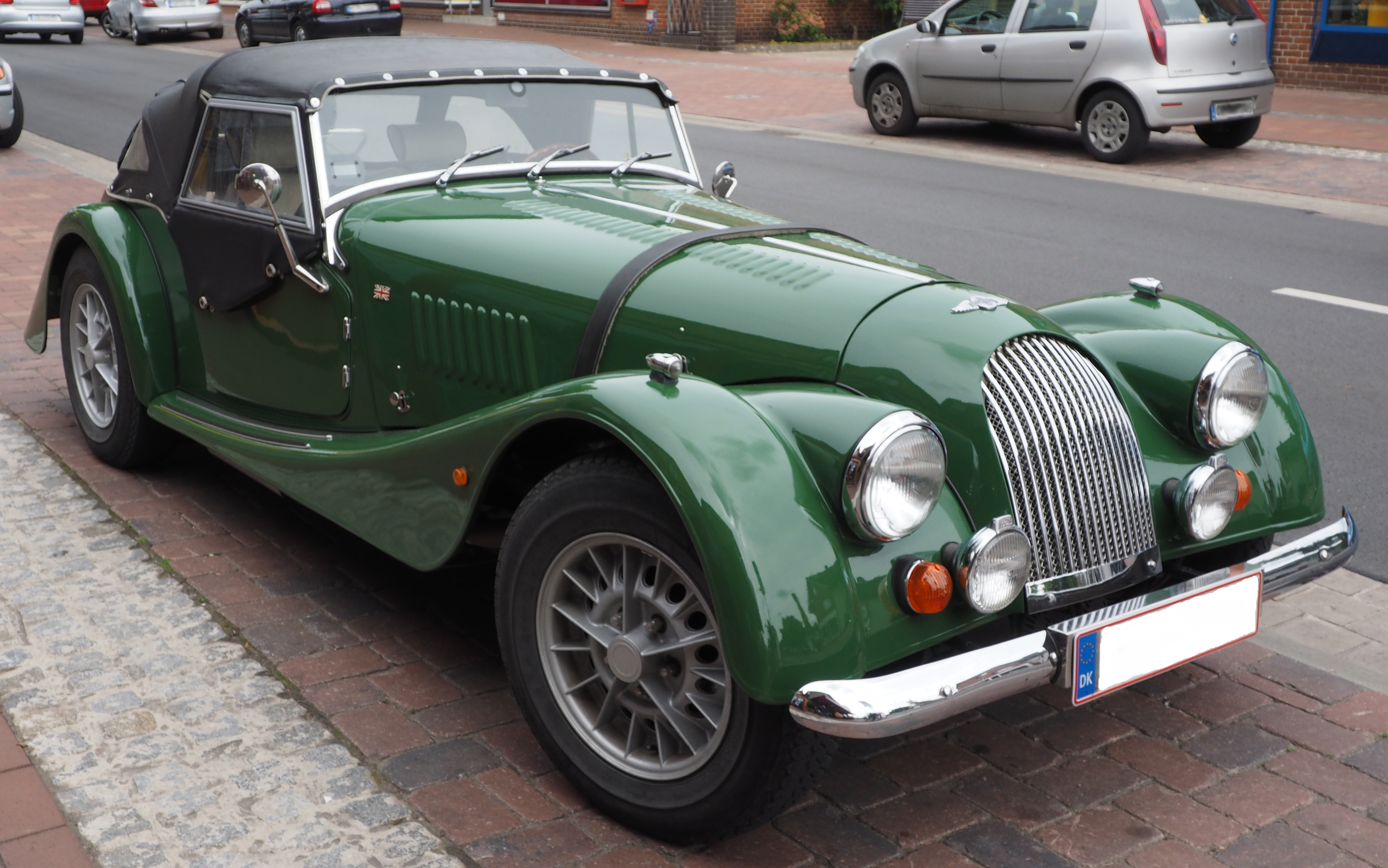
Morgan Plus 8, produced from 1968 to 2004 & 2012 to 2018

By 1968, UK motor vehicle production was dominated by four companies: BLMC, Chrysler (UK), Ford, and Vauxhall (GM). The Rootes Group had taken on the name Chrysler UK after its takeover by the American car giant Chrysler, which had also taken over French carmaker Simca.

The national champion, BLMC (British Leyland from 1968), was handicapped in its attempts to modernise by internal rivalries. Unattractive new products (particularly the Austin Allegro and Morris Marina) which were widely criticised by the motoring press, retention of legacy marques and models, labour disputes, quality issues, supplier problems and inefficient use of new equipment thwarted the dream of efficient high volume production. Increased overseas competition and high unit costs led to lowered profits, which in turn jeopardised investment plans. Although the cars continued to sell well in Britain, they were less popular on overseas markets. As well as that, the company often produced several cars to compete in the same market sector. For instance, it produced four competitors for the Ford Cortina at the same time - the Morris Marina, Austin Maxi, Triumph Dolomite and the Princess.

Japanese cars, particularly the Datsun badged cars built by Nissan enjoyed a strong surge in popularity during the first half of the 1970s, while French carmaker Renault and West German carmaker Volkswagen also enjoyed an upturn on the British market, helped by the arrival of well-received new cars, particularly the Renault 5 in 1972 and the Volkswagen Golf in 1974.

The fortunes of foreign carmakers on the British market were also assisted by the fact that most British manufacturers adopted the hatchback bodystyle, mostly featuring front-wheel drive, considerably later than their continental rivals. For instance, the arrival of the front-wheel drive Volkswagen Golf hatchback in 1974 came four years before any of the four British-based carmakers had launched an equivalent car. By the time the first small British-built hatchback, the Vauxhall Chevette, was launched in 1975, the French Renault 5 had already been in production for three years. However, British Leyland's larger Austin Maxi had been sold with a hatchback and front-wheel drive since its 1969 launch, although it sold similar-sized cars like the Morris Marina and Triumph Dolomite alongside it as a rear-wheel drive saloon alternative, with the Dolomite being sold further upmarket than the Marina. For buyers wanting six-cylinder and larger four-cylinder engines, the Princess was launched in 1975. Chrysler launched the Alpine for this market sector in 1975, featuring front wheel drive and a hatchback, but kept the Hunter in production alongside it until 1979 for buyers who still preferred rear-wheel drive and a saloon or estate bodystyle.

At the luxury end of the market, British Leyland was actually one of the first manufacturers in the world to put a hatchback on an upmarket car when it launched the Rover SD1 in 1976. This car signalled the beginning of rationalisation at British Leyland, with the SD1 replacing two model ranges - the Rover P6 and Triumph 2000/2500.

The popularity of Nissan's range of Datsun-badged cars in the 1970s was largely down to their low prices, cheap running costs, good equipment levels and a reputation for better reliability than most British cars, although these cars also went on to gain a reputation for being prone to rust.

BLMC's share of the UK market dropped from 40% to 32% between 1971 and 1973, with its new Morris Marina and Austin Allegro family cars selling well on the British market but not proving popular on many export markets, with the motoring media being critical of the styling of these new models as well as questions regarding the level of quality.

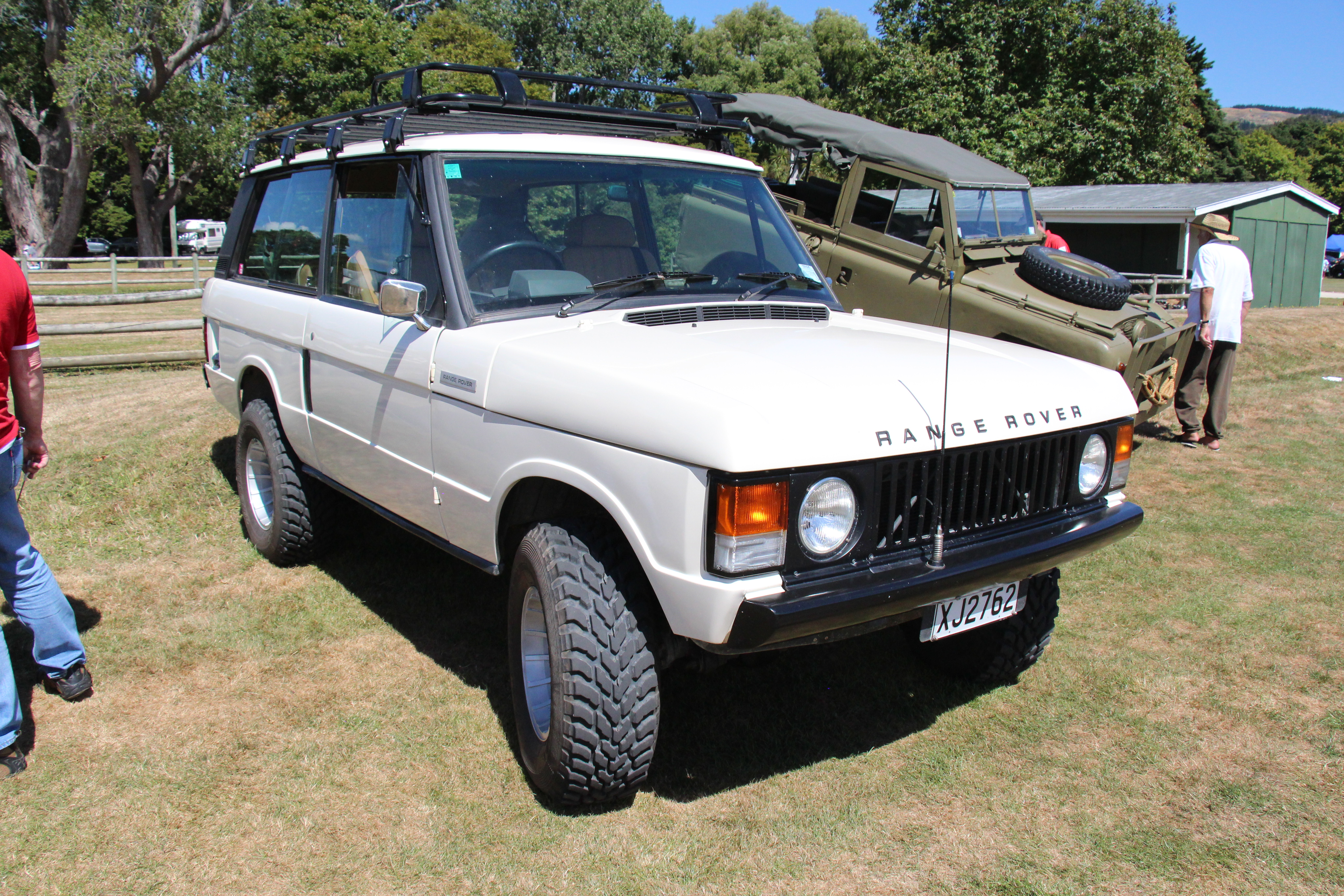
The first-generation Range Rover, produced from 1970-1996

By 1974, the UK's position as a world motor vehicle manufacturer had dropped to sixth place. In 1974, both BLMC and Chrysler UK appealed to the UK Government for financial help. The Government rejected the idea of a merger between the two companies, and instead Chrysler UK received a loan and BLMC was subjected to a series of studies to determine its future. The Government's official BLMC enquiry, led by Lord Ryder, suggested that BLMC's strategy was sound, but required huge state investment to improve productivity by providing mechanisation and improving labour relations.

Despite the effective nationalisation of BLMC as British Leyland (BL) in 1975, the recovery never happened. Chrysler sold its European interests (including those in the UK) to Peugeot in 1978, to allow it to concentrate on its own difficulties in the United States. The UK interests were renamed Peugeot-Talbot, with production of the Chrysler-developed cars continuing, with the last Rootes-developed car, the Avenger, being discontinued in 1981. Peugeot also developed a saloon version of the Alpine called the Solara, and also launched the larger Tagora, which had been in development by Chrysler when it sold its European operations. It also replaced the entry-level Sunbeam with the Peugeot based Samba in 1981.

As in most other developed countries, the 1970s saw major changes to the cars produced in the UK. Front-wheel drive, which had been pioneered by BMC on several new models between 1959 and 1965, now became a common feature on family cars after decades of producing only rear-wheel drive models. The hatchback bodystyle, which had debuted in Europe on the French Renault 16 in 1965, became more popular, with many of Britain's best-selling cars being available with a hatchback by the early-1980s.

Many Ford and Vauxhall models were also being produced at their parent company's continental factories by 1980. Ford had switched Capri and Granada production to Germany by this stage, while production of its new Fiesta supermini was divided between Britain, West Germany and a new plant in Spain from its 1976 launch. General Motors had not only decided to make its Vauxhall and Opel badged cars mechanically identical during the 1970s, but it had also imported some of its Vauxhall-badged cars from Opel factories in West Germany and Belgium, and its Corsa supermini (Vauxhall Nova in the UK) was solely assembled at a factory in Zaragoza, Spain, which opened in 1982. British Leyland's overseas outposts in countries like Italy (where cars were produced under the Innocenti brand) were gradually closed down or sold to other carmakers, so by the 1980s; it was entirely a British-based operation.

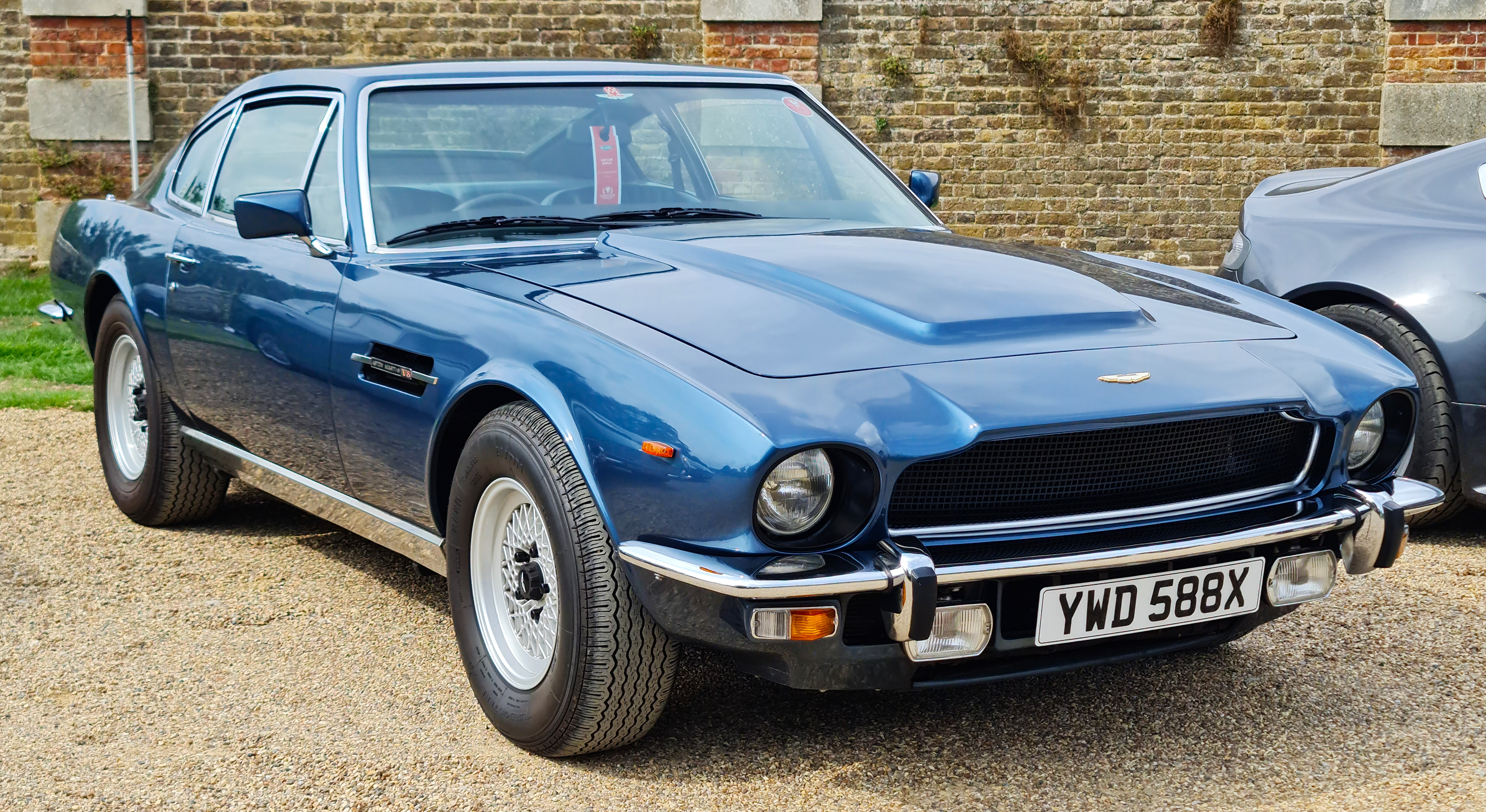
1981 Aston Martin V8 Vantage, produced from 1977-1989

By the end of the 1970s, Ford, Peugeot-Talbot and Vauxhall (GM) were well-integrated with their parent companies' other European operations. BL stood alone in the UK as an increasingly junior player. As part of the drive for increased productivity in the late-1970s, BL reduced its workforce and number of plants, and strived to centralise its management activities. The city of Coventry suffered particularly badly, with many thousands becoming unemployed after the closure of the Triumph car factory in the city in 1980.

In 1979, BL struck a collaboration deal with Honda to share the development and production of a new mid-sized car (Triumph Acclaim/Honda Ballade), which was launched in 1981. The new car combined Honda engine and transmission designs with a BL body, as did its successor model - the Rover 200 Series - in 1984. The next plan was to work on a new luxury car together, the end product being the Rover 800 Series, which arrived in 1986.

Although UK politics changed in 1979 with the election of the Conservative Party, the UK Government continued to support BL with funds for the development of a new mass-market model range (Mini Metro, Maestro, Montego and another Honda collaboration the Rover 800), which were all launched between 1980 and 1986. The Metro was the most successful of these cars.

Car assembly, with the exception of Jaguar, was concentrated into two central plants – Longbridge and Cowley. In July 1986, BL was renamed the Rover Group.

By the mid-1980s, front-wheel drive was now the standard on mass market cars, with most new models having a hatchback bodystyle as at least an option. Although Ford had adopted front-wheel drive for its new Spanish built Fiesta supermini in 1976 and the third generation Escort in 1980, it had curiously retained rear-wheel drive for its larger Sierra (the Cortina replacement) in 1982, although the Sierra did feature a hatchback bodystyle and was not available as a saloon until 1987. In 1983, it recognised the continuing demand for smaller and medium-sized family saloons by introducing the Orion, which was based on the Escort floorpan.

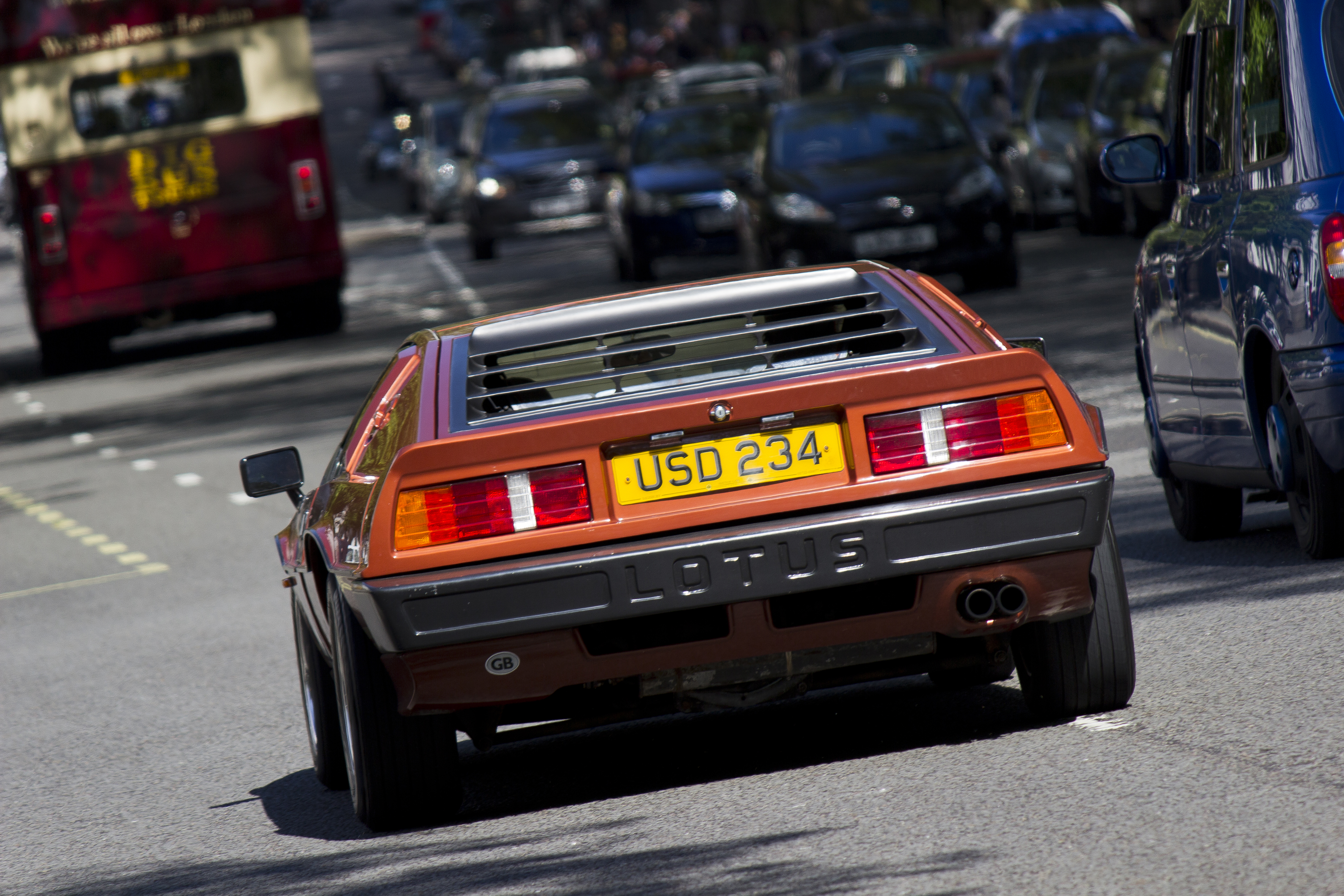
The third generation Lotus Esprit S3, produced from 1982-1993

The supermini sector had expanded rapidly since the early-1970s. BMC's Mini had remained popular beyond its twentieth anniversary, but successor organisation British Leyland had started work on a more modern and practical alternative by the mid-1970s, the final result being the Austin Metro in 1980 - the new car featured more modern styling and a hatchback bodystyle. Chrysler Europe had axed the long-running Hillman Imp (launched by the Rootes Group in 1963) in 1976 and replaced it with the Chrysler Sunbeam hatchback a year later. General Motors had already adopted this bodystyle with the Vauxhall Chevette (which was also available as a saloon or estate) and Ford with the Fiesta. Comparable foreign products like the Fiat 127, Renault 5 and Volkswagen Polo were also proving popular in the UK.

Ford had now divided its European operations between its British factories and other European plants in Spain, Belgium and West Germany. General Motors had started importing some of its West German and Belgian built Opel products to the UK to be badged as Vauxhalls, and by 1983 its Nova supermini (badged as the Opel Corsa on the continent) was built solely in its Spanish factory. Peugeot was dividing production of most of the Talbot badged vehicles between the Ryton plant near Coventry (the Linwood plant in Scotland closed in 1981) and its French factories by the early-1980s, and started producing its own models at Coventry in 1985 after deciding to axe the Talbot marque due to falling sales.

Foreign carmakers continued to gain ground on the British market during the 1980s, with the likes of Renault, Peugeot, Citroen (France), Volvo (Sweden), Volkswagen (West Germany) and Fiat (Italy) proving particularly popular.

The Russian-built Lada, first sold in the UK in 1974, also sold well, despite its outdated Fiat-sourced design; with buyers mostly being attracted by its low price. By the late-1980s, with the four-wheel drive Niva and a front-wheel drive hatchback, the Samara, complementing the long-running Riva, Lada sales in Britain had amounted to more than 30,000 a year (some 1.5% of the new car market), but tailed off after 1990 as a result of growing competition and a lack of new model launches. Imports to Britain finally ceased in 1997 due to Lada's difficulties in meeting emissions requirements. Skoda also enjoyed similarly decent sales of its well-priced rear-engined saloon cars during the 1970s and 1980s, going from strength to strength in the 1990s following its takeover by Volkswagen and the launch of new model ranges with modern technology and styling. Zastava's Yugo-badged cars, based on Fiat designs from the 1970s, also sold reasonably well in Britain during the 1980s, but the carmaker was forced to halt imports in 1992 due to sanctions imposed on Yugoslavia as a result of the civil war there. Polish carmaker FSO imported its version of the Fiat 125 to Britain from 1975, later launching a hatchback model (the Polonez) alongside it. However, by 1998, Skoda was the only Eastern European carmaker still exporting cars to Britain, now competing with budget-priced Asian cars from the likes of Daewoo, Kia, Hyundai and Proton.

Nissan had axed the Datsun brand by 1984 and used its own name on all cars, and in 1986 opened a factory in Britain near Sunderland, which produced the mid-range Bluebird hatchbacks and saloons, although it was the Japanese-built Micra which was the company's best-selling car in Britain during the 1980s.

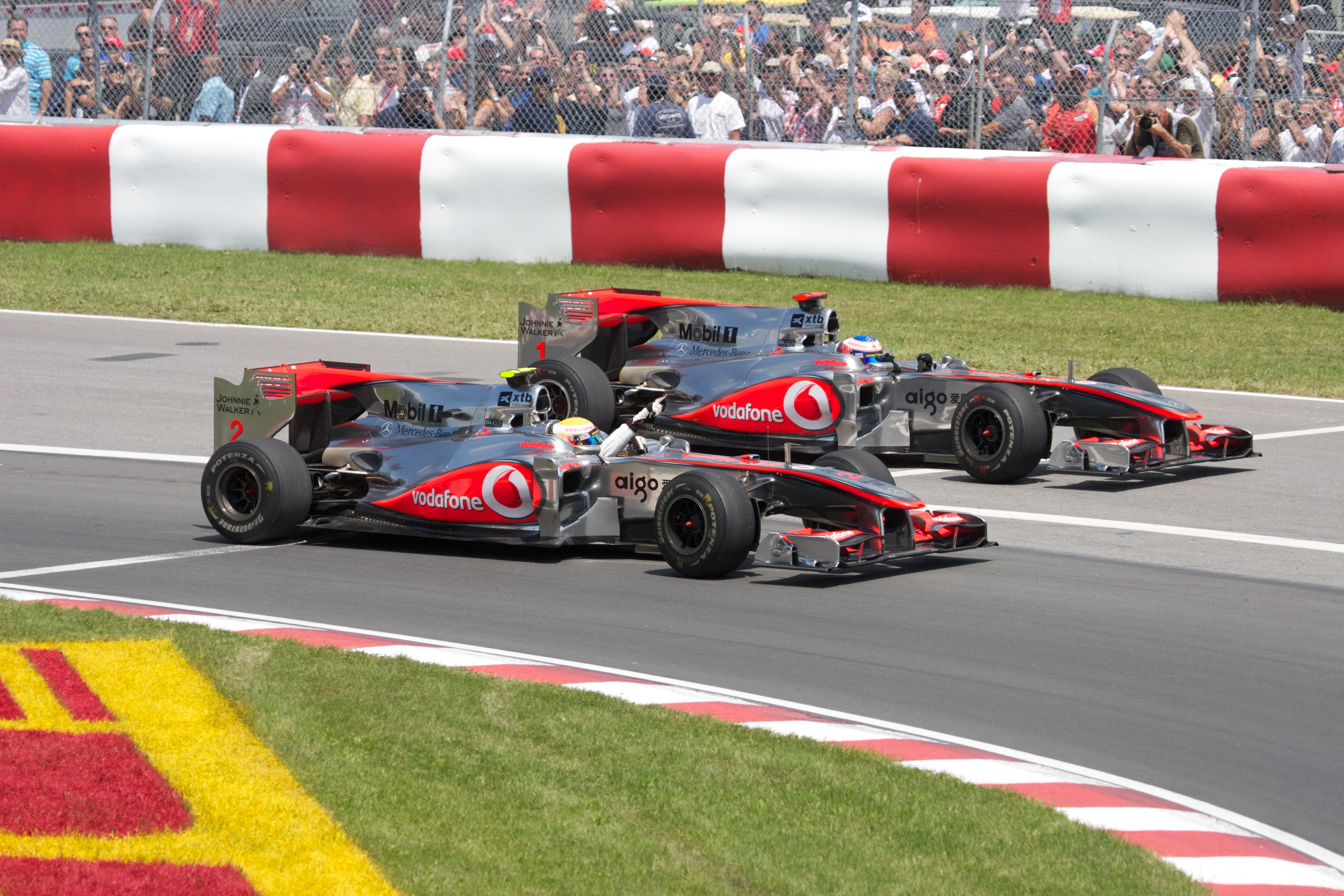
Motorsport in the UK serves as a testing ground for production cars.

The decade also saw the arrival of purpose-built people carriers on the British market, starting with the Japanese Mitsubishi Space Wagon in 1984, and then the market-leading Renault Espace in 1985, but by the end of the decade this type of vehicle still had only a very small share of the British market and there were still no British-built people carriers available, although a few seven-seater estate models including Austin Rover's Montego were being produced.

The decade also saw a fall in demand for sports cars, perhaps due to the rising popularity of "hot hatchbacks" (high performance versions of hatchback cars), and so a number of manufacturers pulled out of the sports car market. British Leyland finished production of its MG and Triumph sports cars early in the decade, with no replacement. General Motors had launched coupe versions of its Cavalier mid-range model in the 1970s, but did not produce any equivalent models of the MK2 Cavalier which arrived in 1981. It did, however, continue to offer the German-built Opel Manta to British buyers until the end of production in 1988, replacing it with the Calibra (also built in Germany) a year later. Ford had enjoyed success in the 1970s with its Capri coupe, but this declined in popularity after 1980 and when production ended in 1986, there was no direct replacement.

As well as the rebranding of the former Rootes Group and its eventual integration into Peugeot, the 1980s also saw the disappearance of several long-established car brands. Production of MG sports cars finished when the Abingdon factory closed in 1980, although the brand was quickly revived on higher performance versions of the Metro, Maestro and Montego. 1980 also saw the closure of the Triumph factory at Canley, Coventry, although the marque survived until 1984 - the same year that the Morris marque was discontinued after more than seventy years. The Morris Ital's successor, the Montego, was sold under the Austin and MG brands, while the Triumph Acclaim's successor was sold as the Rover 200 Series. By 1988, however, the Austin marque had also been phased out, with the former Austin-badged products now being incorporated into the Rover brand.

General Motors enjoyed an upturn in Britain during the 1980s, as its Vauxhall-badged cars increased their market share and the company's image also improved. At the beginning of 1980, it replaced the Viva with a new front-wheel drive range of hatchback and estates - the Astra, which was built in Britain and also in Opel factories on the continent. The MK2 Cavalier was launched in 1981, and became the company's best selling car of the decade. Its replacement for the Chevette was the Nova, a rebadged version of the Spanish built Opel Corsa, which was launched in 1983. The MK2 Astra was voted European Car of the Year shortly after its launch in 1984, as was the flagship MK2 Carlton (Opel Omega on the continent) two years later.

=== 1987 to 2001 ===
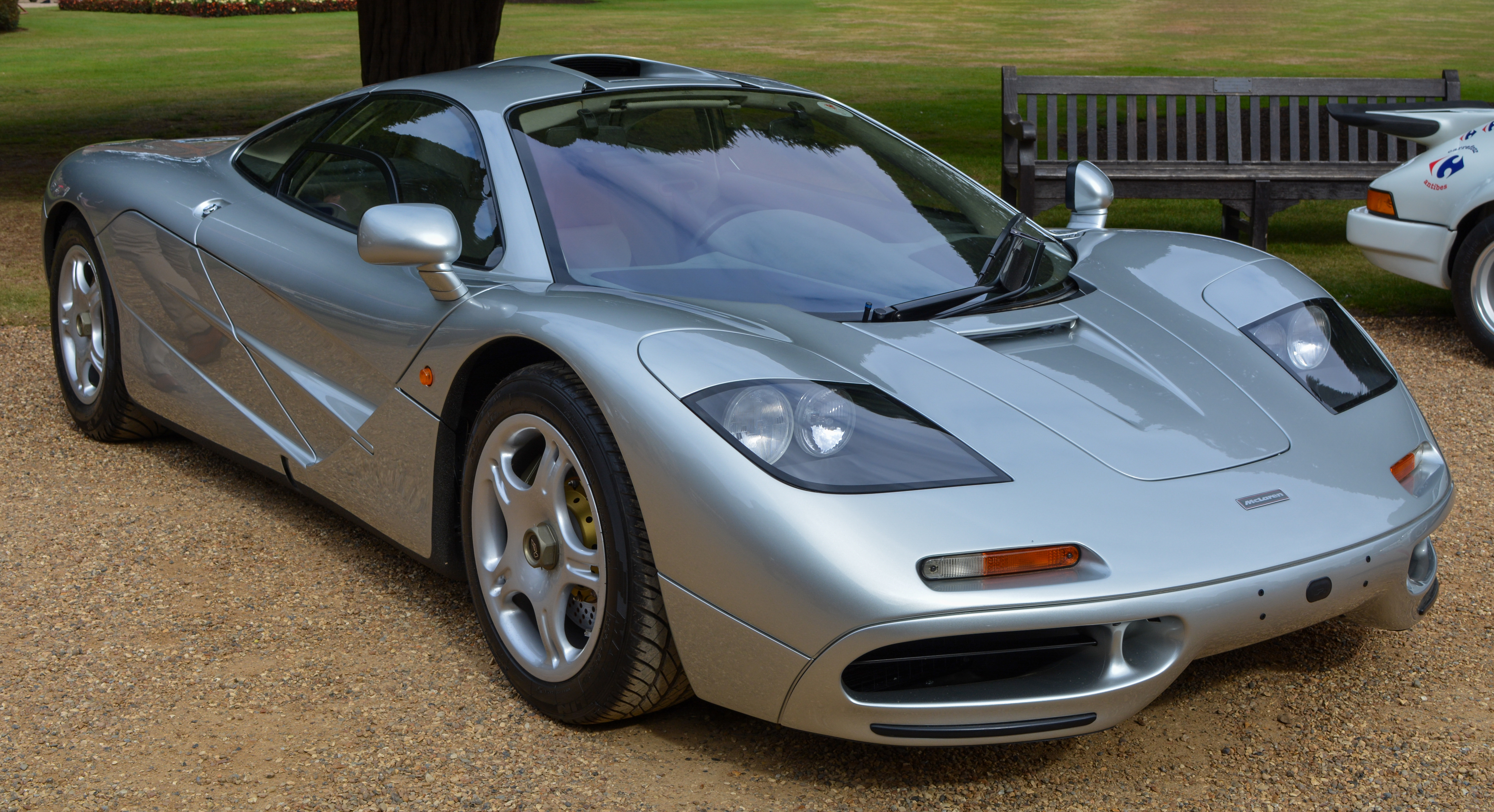
1996 McLaren F1, produced from 1992-2000

In July 1986, Nissan became the first Japanese carmaker to set up a production facility in Europe, when it opened a new plant in Sunderland. The plant initially produced the Bluebird and from 1990 its successor, the Primera, with the MK2 Micra joining it in 1992. Toyota opened a new plant in Burnaston near Derby at the beginning of 1992.

Peugeot started production of the Peugeot 309 hatchback at Ryton (originally a Rootes Group factory) in October 1985, followed by the Peugeot 405 two years later. During the 1990s, production of the 306 and 206 also began at Ryton.

Honda's venture with Austin Rover/Rover Group saw a number of different designs shared between the two marques. The venture came to an end in February 1994 when British Aerospace sold Rover Group to the German carmaker BMW for £800 million. The takeover meant that, for the first time in 112 years, the United Kingdom no longer had a British-owned volume car maker. BMW's ownership of the Rover Group saw the development of several newer, more upmarket models, giving the British brand an image to match that of its parent company. BMW also revived the MG marque in 1995 on a new affordable sports car, the MGF, as well as strengthening Land Rover's position in the off-roader market. In March 2000 BMW controversially announced the break-up of the Rover Group. It retained the rights to the Mini marque, while selling Land Rover to Ford. The MG and Rover marques were sold to the Phoenix Consortium, who branded the remains of the group as MG Rover and concentrated all production at the Longbridge plant. After the split from Rover, Honda continued making the Civic range in the UK at a new plant in Swindon.

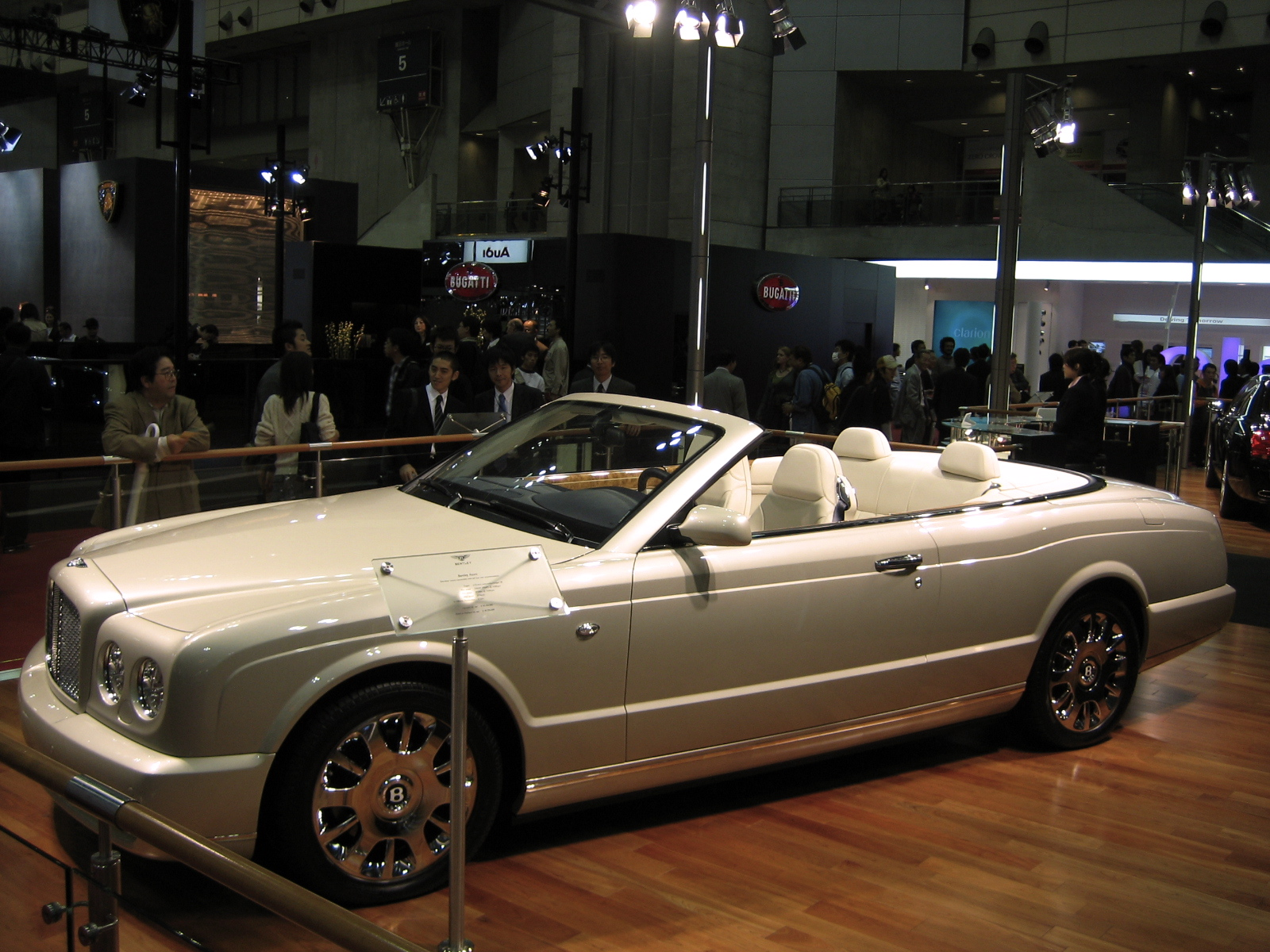
The Bentley Azure, produced from 1995-2003

Ford acquired Aston Martin for an undisclosed sum in September 1987 and Jaguar for US$2.38 billion in November 1989. Production of the new small Jaguar, the X type, started at Halewood in late 2000. By the end of the century, Ford had also acquired Land Rover.

In 1998 Vickers plc put Rolls-Royce Motors, including Bentley, up for auction. Volkswagen Group won the auction with a bid of US$780 million, but Rolls-Royce plc, which had the right to block a transfer of the Rolls-Royce name to non-British owners, agreed to sell the rights to BMW for US$65 million. It was subsequently agreed that control of the Rolls-Royce marque would pass from Volkswagen to BMW in 2003.

In 1995, Ford finally entered the decade-old people carrier market with its Galaxy, which was built in Portugal alongside the identical Volkswagen Sharan and Seat Alhambra as part of a venture between Ford and Volkswagen. Vauxhall entered this sector of the market a year later with the American-built Sintra, but this was not popular with British buyers and was discontinued after just three years when the smaller, German-built Zafira was launched, and proved far more popular than Vauxhall's original entry into the MPV market.

The affordable sports car market enjoyed a revival in the 1990s after going into virtual hibernation in the 1980s. Sparked by the popularity of the Japanese-built Mazda MX-5 after its launch in 1989, Rover began development on a new sports car in the early 1990s, finally launching the MG F two-seater roadster in 1995, 15 years after the demise of the last volume MG sports cars. The 1996 Lotus Elise also enjoyed relatively strong sales in this market sector, as did the Vauxhall VX220 (based on the Elise) which was launched in 2000. Ford, which had exited the sports car market by 1987 with the demise of the Capri to concentrate on faster versions of its best-selling hatchbacks and saloons, returned to this market sector in 1994 with the American-built Probe, and then enjoyed more success with its smaller Puma between 1997 and 2002.

=== 2001 to 2011 ===
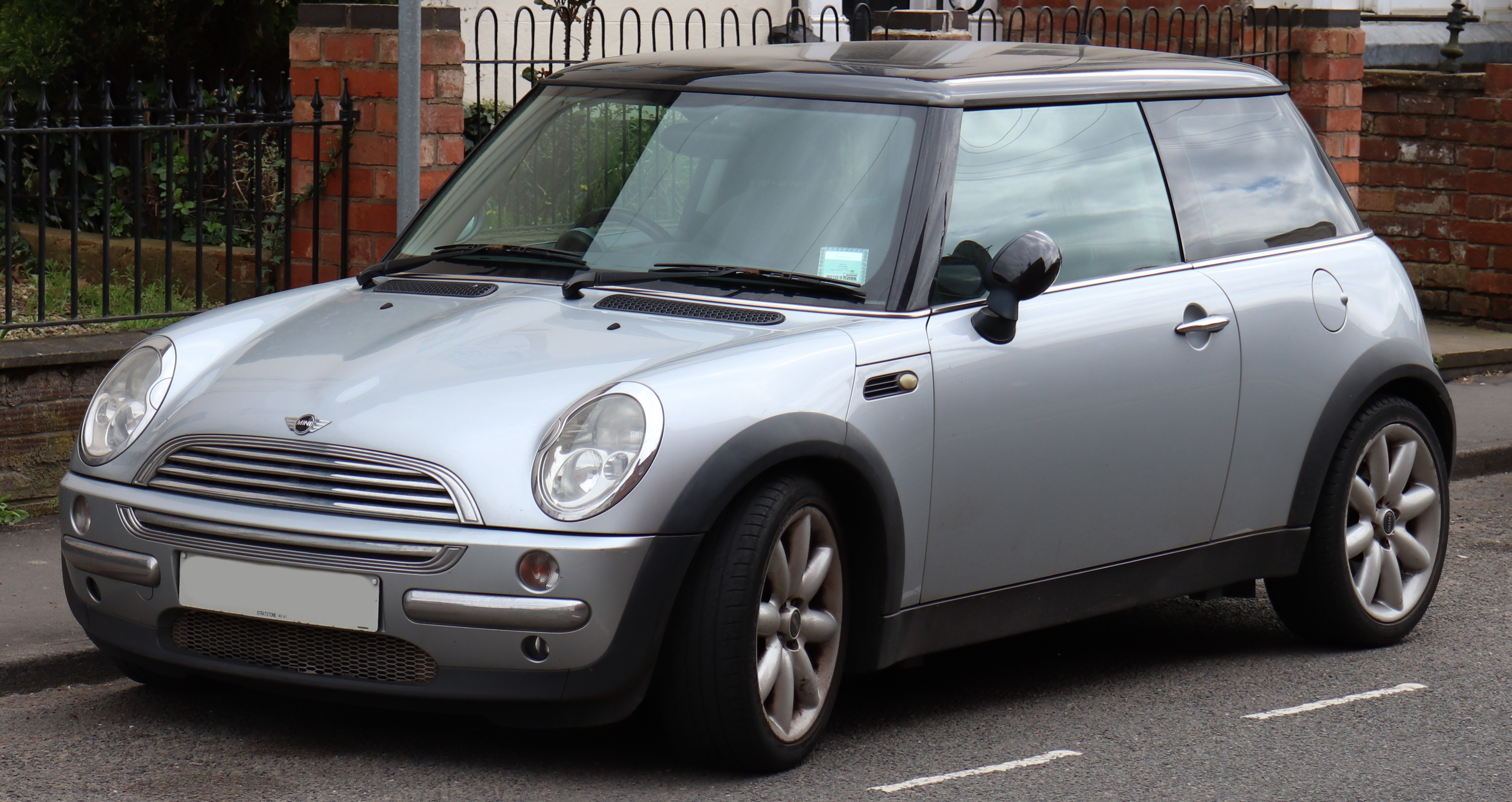
2003 First generation Mini Cooper, produced from 2001-2006

In May 2000 Ford announced that passenger car assembly as its Ford Dagenham plant would cease in 2002, ending 90 years of Ford passenger car assembly in the UK. At the same time Ford announced that it would invest US$500 million in the expansion of a diesel engine factory at the site, making Dagenham its largest diesel engine center worldwide and creating about 500 new jobs to offset the 1,900 lost in vehicle assembly for a total loss of 1,400. In December 2004 Ford announced a further investment of £169 million in the Dagenham plant, increasing annual output to one million diesel engines.

The closure of Vauxhall's Luton car assembly plant in March 2003 left Ellesmere Port as the sole Vauxhall assembly plant remaining in the UK. General Motors also retained the former Bedford works in Luton for producing vans such as the Vivaro and the Movano as well as Renault and Nissan badged variants. In April 2007, it was confirmed that the Ellesmere Port would produce the next generation Astra from 2010.

Losses at Jaguar led to closure of the company's Browns Lane plant in Coventry in 2004. Spare capacity at Halewood allowed Land Rover Freelander production to be transferred there in 2006.

MG Rover spent the early part of the 2000s investigating possible ventures with other carmakers in order to develop a new range of cars. Proposed links with foreign organisations including Malaysian carmaker Proton failed to materialise, and by late 2004 Chinese carmaker SAIC Motor had shown an interest in taking over the Longbridge-based firm – which was now hundreds of millions of pounds in debt. Talks broke down and the firm went into receivership in April 2005 with the loss of more than 6,000 jobs. Three months later, the firm's assets were purchased by another Chinese carmaker – Nanjing Automobile – and Longbridge partially re-opened over the summer of 2007 with an initial workforce of around 250 preparing to restart production of the MG TF which was relaunched in August 2008.

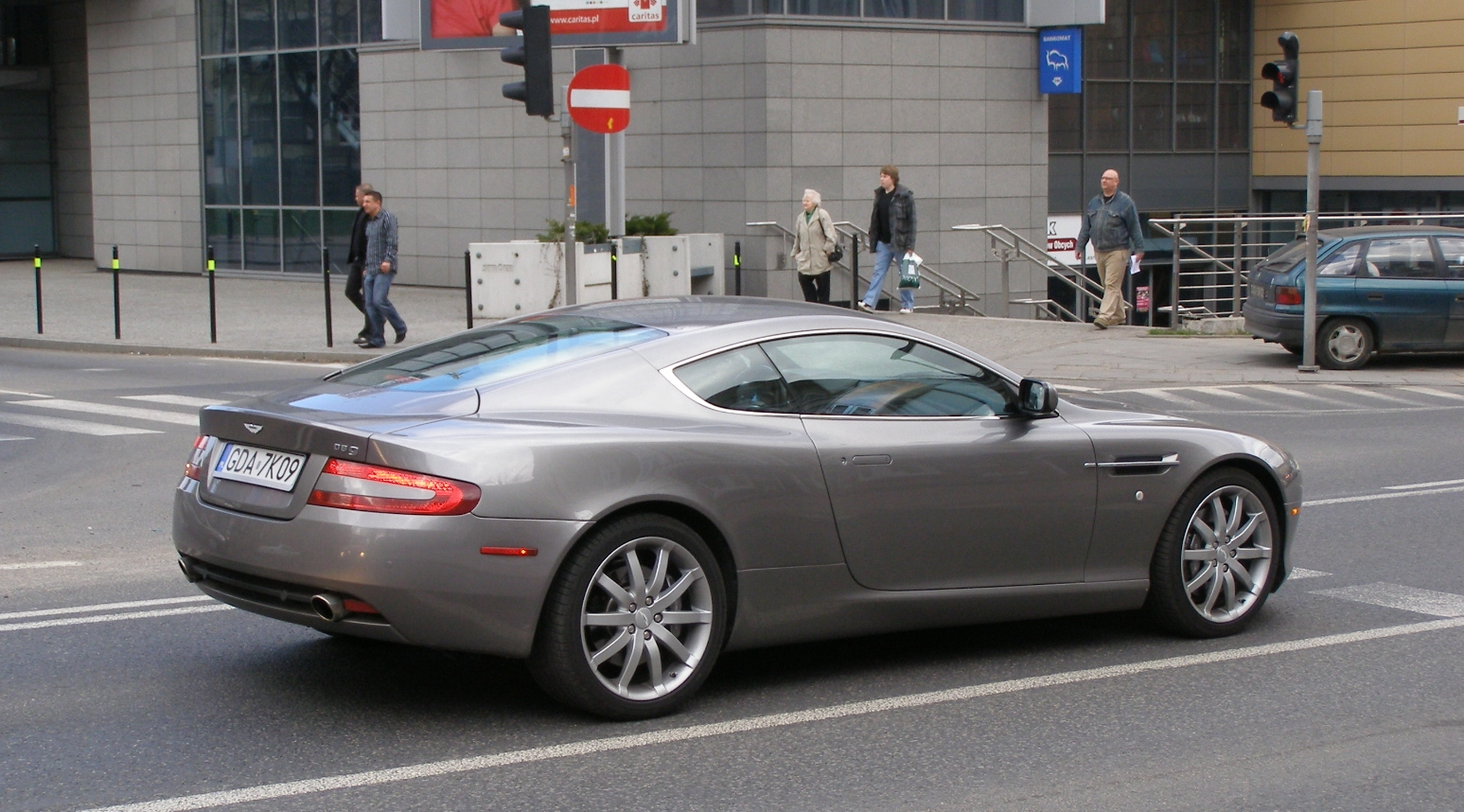
Aston Martin DB9, produced from 2004-2016

In April 2006 Peugeot closed its Ryton plant and moved 206 production to Slovakia. In 2007, Ford sold Aston Martin to a British-led Consortium backed by Middle East investors, retaining a small stake in the company and agreeing to continue the supply of components including engines. In 2008 Ford sold Jaguar Land Rover to Tata Motors of India for £1.15 billion. In November 2009, Dutch sportscar maker Spyker Cars announced that it would be moving production from Zeewolde to Whitley, Coventry, and UK production began in February 2010.

In March 2010 McLaren Automotive unveiled its MP4-12C model, alongside plans to produce around 4,000 cars per year at its Woking factory by the middle of the decade. At the Paris Motor Show in September 2010 Lotus Cars unveiled five new models due to go on sale by 2016, alongside plans for an investment of £770 million over 10 years, the complete redevelopment of its Hethel factory and an increase in production from under 3,000 cars per year to 6,000 to 7,000. In December 2010 it was announced that Renault had sold its remaining 25% shareholding in its eponymous Formula 1 team to Lotus Cars, and that the team would be renamed Lotus Renault in 2011.

=== 2011 to 2019 ===
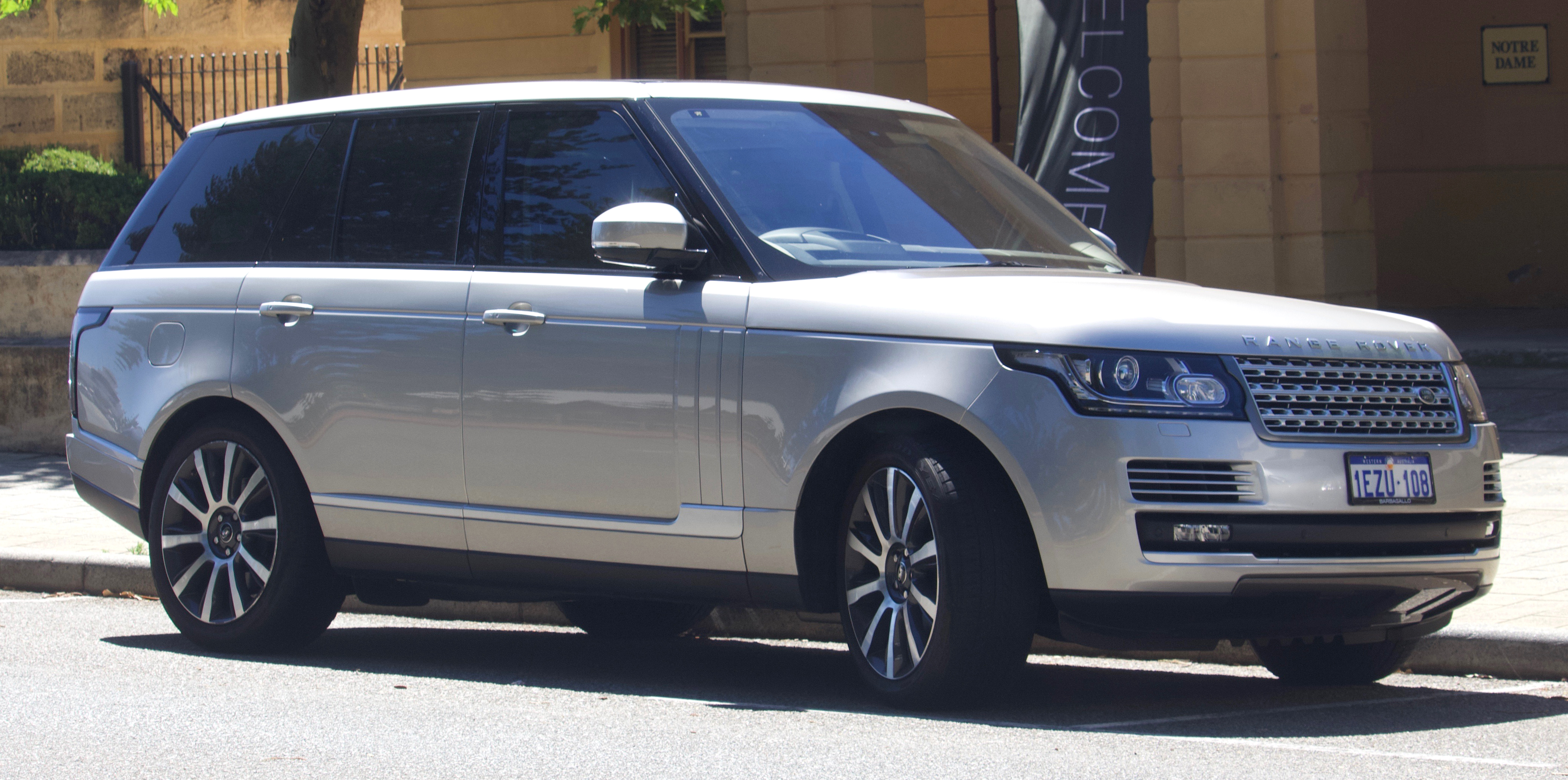
2016 Range Rover Vogue, produced from 2012-2022

In January 2011, BMW announced that it would be extending the Mini range with the launch of two new two-door sports cars based on the Mini Paceman concept car, with a coupe version to enter production in 2011 and a roadster in 2012. In March 2011 Jaguar Land Rover announced that it would be hiring an additional 1,500 staff at its Halewood plant, and signed over £2 billion of supply contracts with UK-based companies, to enable production of its new Range Rover Evoque model. In April 2011 the MG Motor subsidiary of SAIC Motor announced that mass production had resumed at the Longbridge plant, as the first MG 6 to be produced in the United Kingdom came off the production line. In May 2011 Jaguar unveiled plans to build the C-X75 petrol-electric hybrid supercar in the UK from 2013, with production to be in association with Williams Grand Prix Engineering; Jaguar announced the cancellation of the project in December 2012 due to the Great Recession.

In May 2011, Aston Martin Lagonda confirmed that it was planning to revive the Lagonda marque, with the launch of two or three new models. In an interview with Reuters in the same month, Carl-Peter Forster, the Chief Executive of Tata Motors, revealed that Jaguar Land Rover would be investing over £5 billion in product development over the succeeding five years.

In June, Nissan announced that the replacement for its Qashqai model would be designed and built in the UK, in a total investment of £192 million safeguarding around 6,000 jobs. In June BMW announced an investment of £500 million in the UK over the subsequent three years as part of an expansion of the Mini range to seven models. In September 2011, Jaguar Land Rover confirmed that it would be investing £355 million in the construction of a new engine plant near Wolverhampton, to manufacture a new family of four-cylinder petrol and diesel engines. Later in the same month it was announced that the Jensen marque would be revived, with a new version of the Interceptor to be built by CPP Holdings at the former Jaguar factory Browns Lane in Coventry. In November, Toyota announced plans to make the UK its sole European manufacturing base for hatchback versions of its next C-segment family car, resulting in the investment of over £100 million in its Burnaston plant and the creation of around 1,500 new jobs.

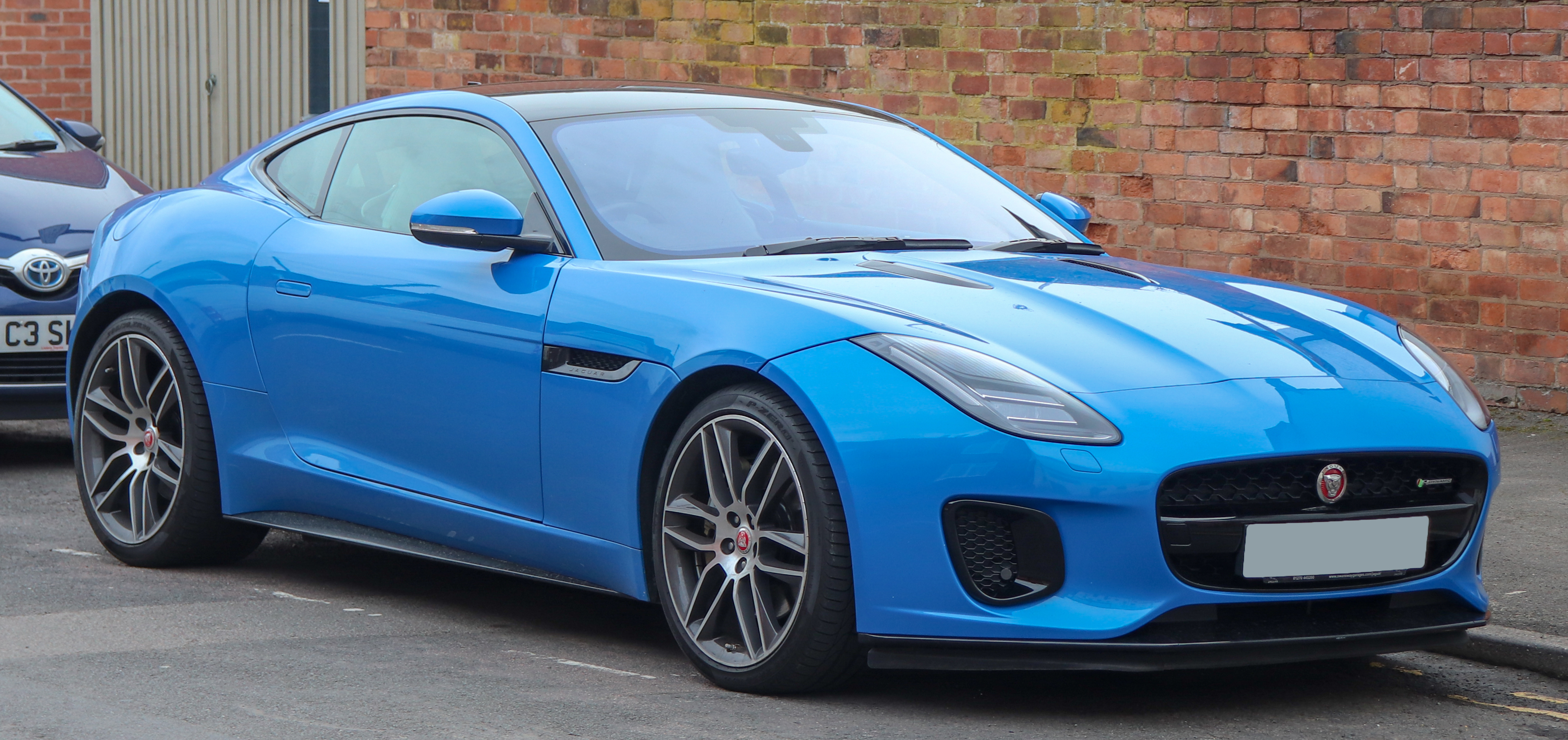
2017 first generation Jaguar F-Type R Coupe, produced from 2013-2019

In September 2013 it was announced that a new National Automotive Innovation Campus would be built at the University of Warwick's main campus at a cost of £100 million, with £45 million to be contributed by Jaguar Land Rover.

In the half-year from January to June 2014, the UK had its best year in new car sales in 9 years. 1.28 million new cars were sold during the period, a rise of 10% compared to the same period in 2013. In 2014, more than 1.5 million cars were produced, the highest since 2007.

The Society of Motor Manufacturers and Traders (SMMT) figures show a total of 2.31 million new cars were registered in 2019, down 2.4% from the year before. It was the third consecutive year of decline, and the SMMT expects that trend to continue in 2020.

In the year 2019, the best selling vehicle in the UK was Ford Fiesta, followed by Volkswagen Golf, Ford Transit, Ford Focus, and Vauxhall Corsa.

In February 2019, Honda announced the Swindon plant (the only Honda plant in Europe) would close by 2021, as Honda sells more vehicles in regions outside Europe and the need to launch electrified vehicles.

In June 2019, Ford announced that it would close its Ford Bridgend Engine Plant by September 2020 due to a lack of demand for the "Dragon" engine produced there. The plant was closed on 25 September 2020.

=== 2020-present ===
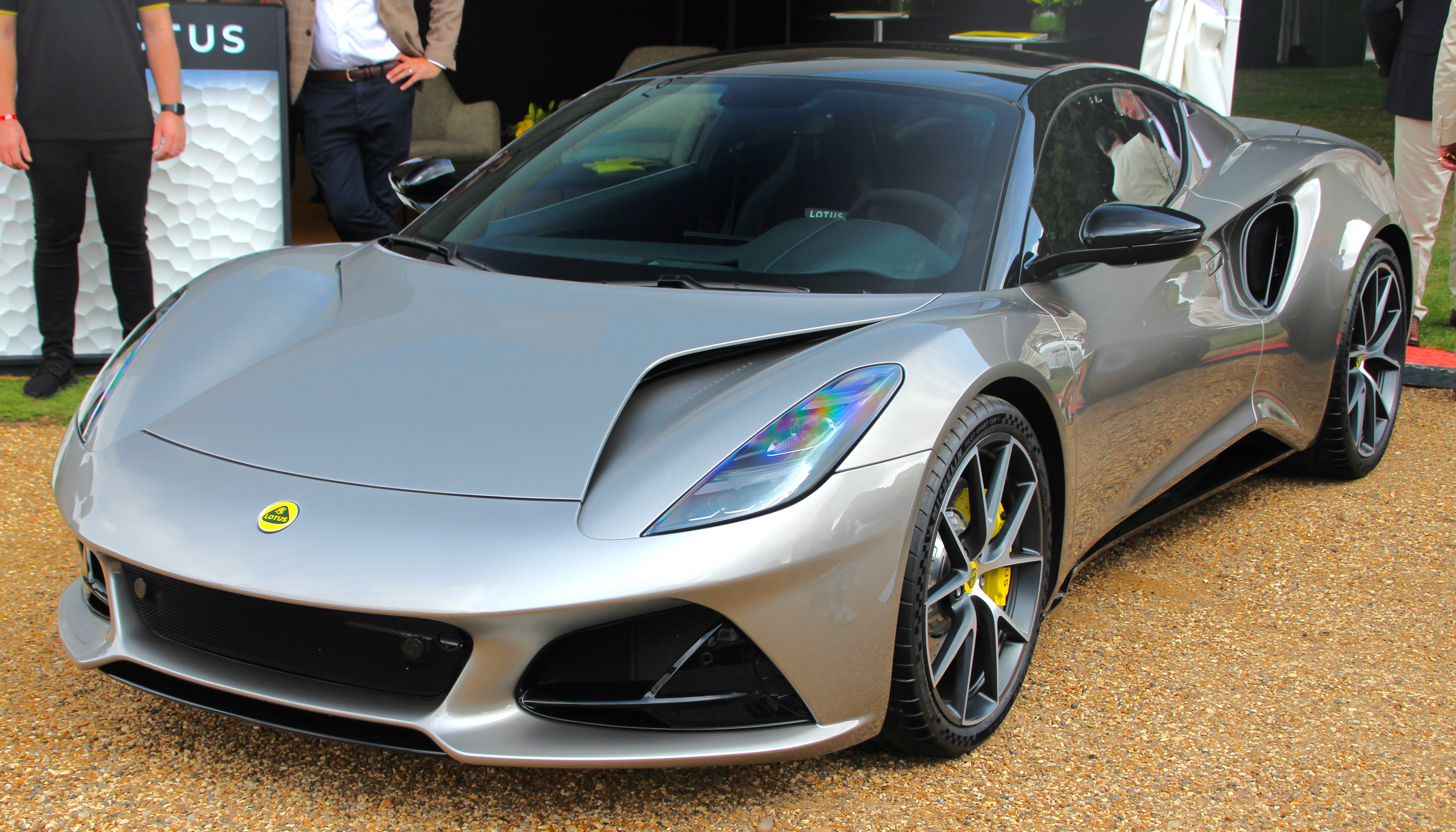
Lotus Emira, produced from 2022-present

In March 2021, Aston Martin announced that their electric sports models would be manufactured at their car plant in Gaydon, Warwickshire.

On 30 July 2021, Honda UK Manufacturing (HUM) ceased operations with the final car produced, a Modern Steel Metallic Civic Hatchback to be exported to the US, rolling off the production line. The closure marked the end of Honda manufacturing in Europe. The former manufacturing site was sold to Panattoni, a European real estate developer in new build industrial and logistics facilities, into a major logistics and distribution hub called Panattoni Park.

During the 2020s, Chinese cars rapidly gained popularity in the UK, including companies such as BYD Auto and Chery. By the end of September 2025, 13% of all new cars sold in the UK were manufactured in China, ahead of South Korea and just slightly behind Japan at 14%. By April 2026, the share of Chinese cars increased to 18%. By September 2026, that share further increased to 24%.

== Assembly plants ==
=== Currently operating assembly plants ===
Company	Parent company	Parent headquarters	Plant	Models produced	Production (latest figures)
Alexander Dennis	NFI Group	Canada	Falkirk; Guildford	Enviro200, Enviro300, Enviro400 Dart Lance Trident Javelin, R-Series	n/a
Ariel	Ariel	United Kingdom	Crewkerne	Atom	70 (2013)
Aston Martin	Aston Martin	United Kingdom	Gaydon, St Athan	DBS, Vantage, DB12, Valkyrie, DBX	6,200 (2022)
Bentley	Volkswagen Group	Germany	Crewe	Continental Flying Spur, Continental GT, Bentayga	5,174 (2022)
BMW	BMW	Germany	Cowley	Mini Cooper	210,973 (2016)
Briggs Automotive Company	Briggs Automotive Company	United Kingdom	Liverpool	BAC Mono	n/a
Caterham Cars	Caterham Cars	United Kingdom	Dartford	R400, CSR260	435 (2003)
Dennis Eagle	Royal Terberg Group	Netherlands	Warwick Blackpool	Elite+, eCollect, Olympus, Duo, One Pass, Beta 2	1,000+
Ginetta Cars	LNT Automotive	United Kingdom	Leeds	G40, G40J, G40R, G50, G55, G55 GT3, G60	n/a
Jaguar Land Rover	Tata Motors	India	Castle Bromwich; Halewood; Solihull	Discovery, Discovery Sport, Range Rover, Range Rover Evoque, Range Rover Sport, Range Rover Velar	288,677 (includes Halewood production)
Leyland Trucks	Paccar	United States	Leyland	DAF CF, DAF LF, DAF XF	17,478
LEVC	Geely	China	Coventry	TX, VN5	2,508 (2022)
Lotus Cars	Geely	China	Hethel	Evija, Emira	1,710 (2021)
McLaren Automotive	CYVN Holdings	United Arab Emirates	Woking	Artura, 750S, GTS, Solus GT	1,598 (2021)
Morgan Motor Company	Morgan Motor Company	United Kingdom	Malvern	Morgan Plus Four, Morgan Plus Six, Morgan Super 3	516 (2003)
Nissan UK	Nissan	Japan	Sunderland	Juke, Leaf, Qashqai	507,444 (2016)
Noble Automotive	Noble Automotive	United Kingdom	Barwell	M500	n/a
Optare	Ashok Leyland	India	Sherburn in Elmet; Blackburn	Alero, Solo, Versa, Tempo, Esteem, Spectra, Olympus, Visionaire	n/a
Plaxton	NFI Group	Canada	Scarborough; Sheffield	Panther, Paragon, Profile, Primo, Centro, Cheetah, Pronto, Beaver	n/a
REE Automotive	REE Automotive	Israel	Coventry	P7-B, Proxima	
Rolls-Royce Motor Cars	BMW	Germany	Goodwood	Ghost, Phantom VIII, Spectre, Cullinan	3,538
Toyota Manufacturing UK	Toyota	Japan	Burnaston	Corolla	n/a
Wrightbus	Bamford Bus Company	United Kingdom	Ballymena	Streetlite, Eclipse, StreetCar, GB Hawk, Solar, Pulsar, Streetdeck, Eclipse Gemini, Pulsar Gemini, Gemini 2	n/a
Vauxhall	Stellantis	Netherlands	Ellesmere Port	Opel Astra/Vauxhall Astra	118,112 (2016)

There are numerous small companies manufacturing a small number of cars such as David Brown Automotive, Lister Cars, Lightning Car Company, Munro Vehicles and Atalanta Motors.

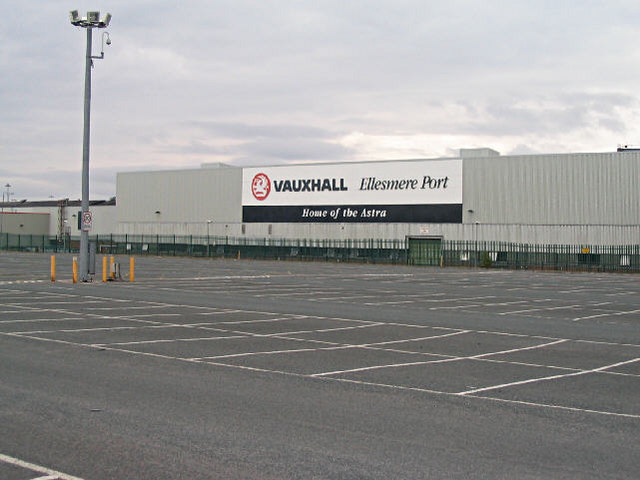
Vauxhall Ellesmere Port, a Vauxhall Motors assembly plant in Ellesmere Port

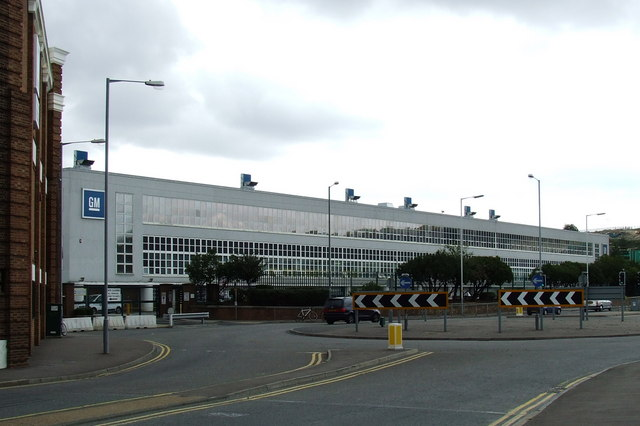
The GM Manufacturing Luton plant in Luton

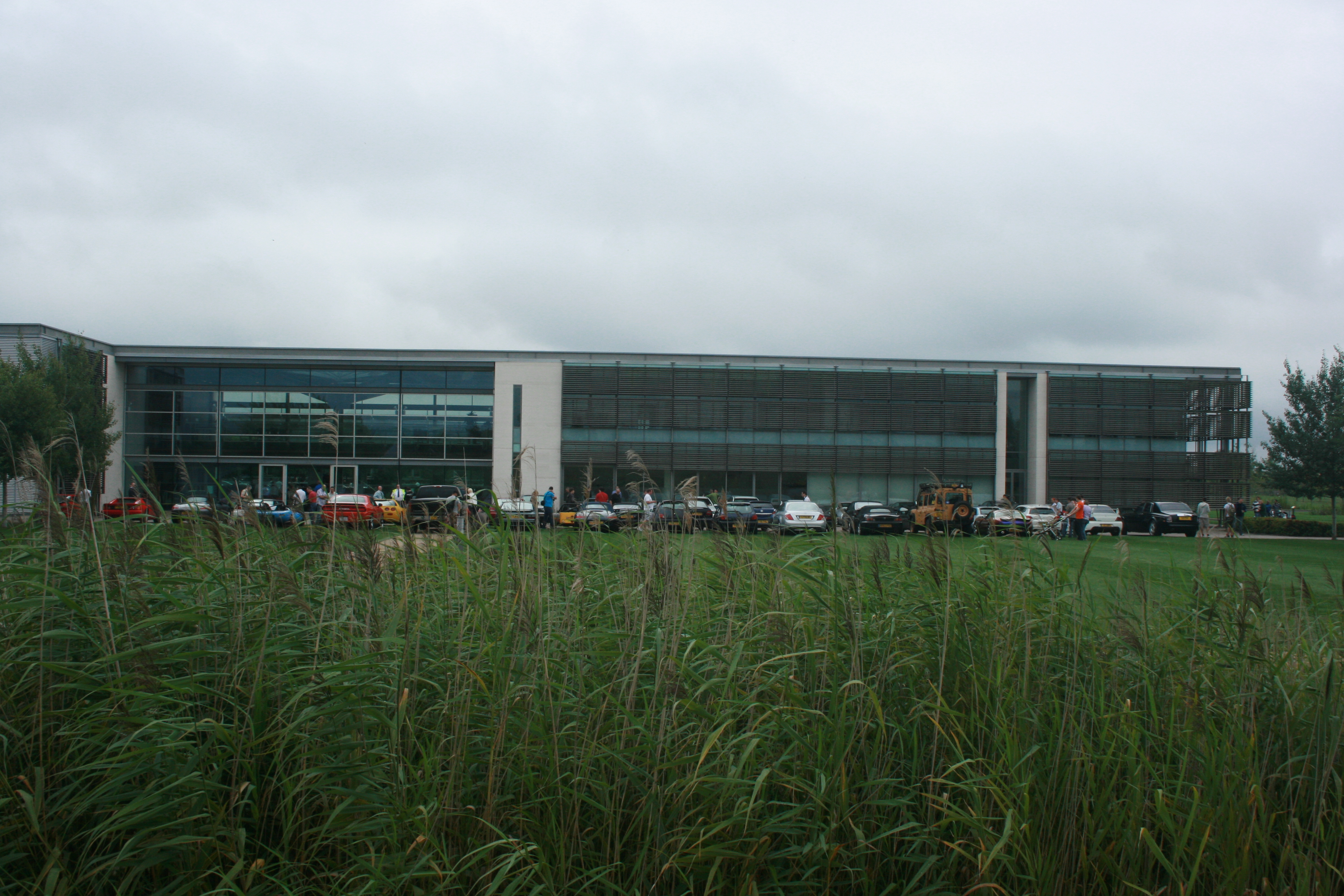
Goodwood plant, the main assembly plant for Rolls-Royce Motor Cars

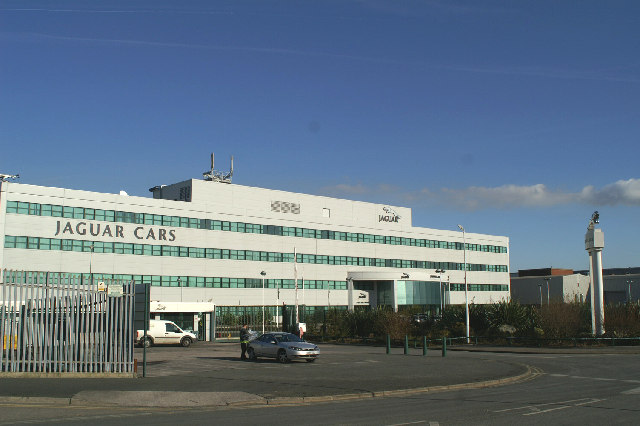
Halewood Body & Assembly, a Jaguar Land Rover assembly plant in Halewood

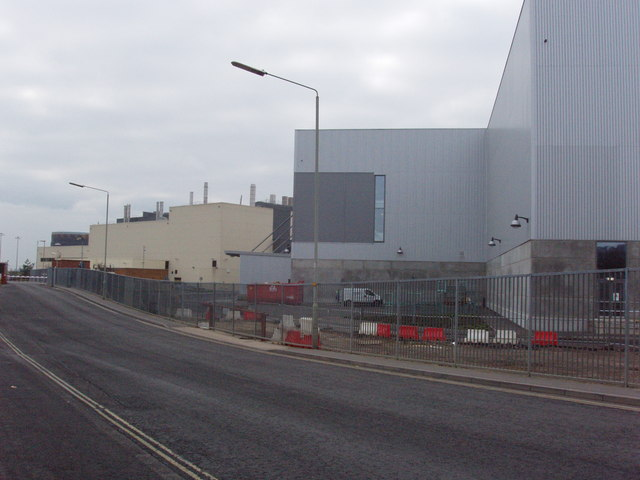
Plant Oxford in Cowley, Oxford, the main assembly plant for the Mini range

=== Former assembly plants ===
Company	Parent company	Parent headquarters	Plant	Models produced	Production
AC Cars	AC Cars	United Kingdom	West Norwood		
AC Cars (EU)	AC Cars	United Kingdom	Thames Ditton, Surrey	AC MKVI	
Honda UK Manufacturing	Honda	Japan	Swindon	CR-V, Jazz, Civic, Civic Type-R	134,146 (2016)
Sunbeam	Sunbeam Motor Car Company	United Kingdom	Coventry	City EV, Electra EV	n/a
TVR Motor Company	TVR Motor Company	United Kingdom	Blackpool; Ebbw Vale	Griffith	872 (2003)

== Production data ==
key	Cars	Commercial vehicles

UK Motor Vehicle Production by year 1899 to 1980 – cars and commercial vehicles (1,000 units)
Year	200			400		600	800	1000			1200	1400	1600		1800	2000	2200	Total
1899	split not available						1											
1906	split not available						28											
1907	split not available						10,3											
1908	split not available						10,5											
1909	split not available						11											
1910	split not available						14											
1911	split not available						19											
1912	split not available						23,2											
1913	split not available						34											
1920	split not available						70*											
1921	split not available						40											
1922	split not available						73											
1923	71,9	23,6						95,5										
1924	116,6	30						146,6										
1925	132		35					167										
1926	153,5		44,5					198										
1927	164,6		47,2					211,8										
1928	165,4		46,5					211,9										
1929	182,3		56,5					238,8										
1930	169,7			66,9					236,6									
1931	159			67,3					226,3									
1932	171,2			61,5					232,7									
1933	220,8			65,5					286,3									
1934	256,9			85,6					342,5									
1935	311,5				92,2					403,7								
1936	353,8				107,6					461,4								
1937	389,6				118,1					507,7								
1938	341				103,8					444,8								
1939	305				97					402								
1940	2	132						134										
1950	523						263						785					
1960	1,353						458							1,811				
1970	1,641						458					2,098						
1980	924						389								1,312			

(* estimated figure)

UK Motor Vehicle Production by year 1990 to 2013 – cars and commercial vehicles (1,000 units)
Year	200	400	600	800	1000		1200				1400		1600	1800	2000	Total
1990	1,296			270								1,566				
1991	1,237			217									1,454			
1992	1,292			248									1,540			
1993	1,376			193								1,569				
1994	1,467			228						1,695						
1995	1,532			233						1,765						
1996	1,686			238		1,924										
1997	1,698			238		1,936										
1998	1,748			227		1,976										
1999	1,787			186	1,973											
2000	1,641			172			1,814									
2001	1,492			193						1,685						
2002	1,630			191				1,821								
2003	1,658			189			1,846									
2004	1,647			209			1,856									
2005	1,596			207					1,802							
2006	1,442			208							1,650					
2007	1,535			216						1,750						
2008	1,447			203							1,650					
2009	999			91									1,090			
2010	1,270			123									1,393			
2011	1,344			121								1,465				
2012	1,465			112							1,577					
2013	1,510			88						1,597						
2014	1,528			71						1,599						
2015	1,588			94						1,682						
2016	1,722			94		1,817										
2017	1,671			78		1,749										
2018	1,519			85							1,604					
2019	1,303			78								1,381				
2020	920			66									987			
2021	860			73									932			
2022	775			102									877			
2023	905			120									1,025			
2024	779			125									905			

== Car design ==
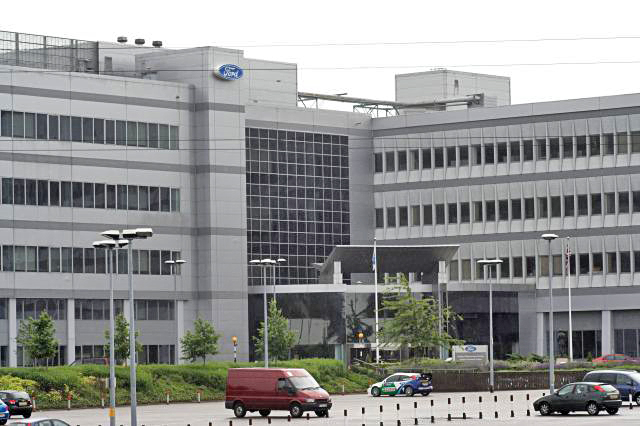
Ford's Dunton Technical Centre in Laindon, Essex, is the largest automotive research and development facility in the UK.

The UK has a strong design and technical base, with several foreign companies basing some of their research and development resource in the UK, including:

- Ford Dunton Technical Centre, Essex
- Jaguar Land Rover Technical Centre, Gaydon
- Jaguar Land Rover HQ and Design Centre, Whitley
- General Motors Millbrook Proving Ground, Bedfordshire
- Nissan Design Europe, London
- Nissan Technical Centre Europe, Cranfield
- SAIC Motor UK Technical Centre, Birmingham

Independent designers and design companies include:

- Gordon Murray Design
- International Automotive Design
- Ogle Design
- Peter Stevens Designs
- Shado (Stephen Harper)

== Motorsport ==
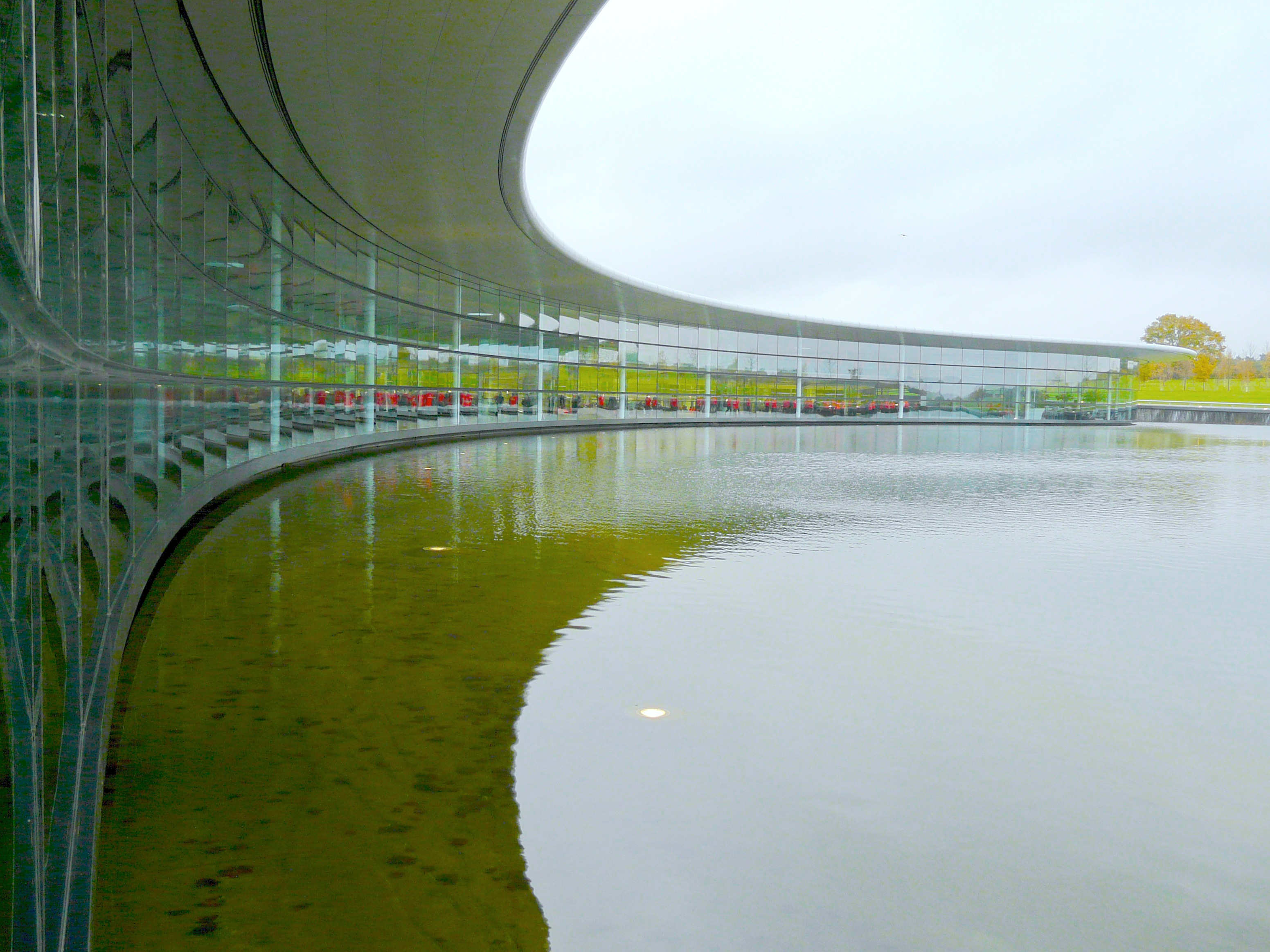
The McLaren Technology Centre in Woking, the home of McLaren Racing

It has been estimated that there are about 4,000 companies in the UK involved in the manufacturing industry related to motorsport.

Formula One motor racing has made its home in the UK, with eight of the eleven teams competing in the 2026 season based in or having their European headquarters in England:

- Haas F1 Team – Banbury
- McLaren F1 Team – Woking
- Mercedes AMG Formula One Team – Brackley
- Aston Martin Formula One Team – Silverstone
- Red Bull Racing – Milton Keynes
- Alpine F1 Team – Enstone
- Williams F1 Team – Grove

Formula One engine suppliers:

- Mercedes AMG High Performance Powertrains – Brixworth
- Honda – Milton Keynes
- Red Bull Powertrains – Milton Keynes

Other Formula One facilities in England:

- Racing Bulls Formula One Team – Bicester (Wind tunnel facilities)
- Audi F1 Team – Bicester (Technology centre)
- Cadillac Formula 1 Team – Silverstone

Other major motorsports teams and organisations:

- Lister Cars – Cambridge
- Rodin Motorsport – Farnham
- Virtuosi Racing – Attleborough
- Invicta Racing – Attleborough
- Ford World Rally Team – Cumbria
- Ilmor Engineering - Brixworth
- M-Sport – Cockermouth
- Prodrive – Banbury (Runs Aston Martin Racing, formerly Subaru's WRC Team and Ford Performance Vehicles)
- RML Group – Wellingborough
- Strakka Racing – Northamptonshire
- Sumo Power - Rye
- Team Dynamics – Pershore
- Triple Eight Racing – Buntingford
- Cosworth – Northampton
- McLaren Applied – Woking
- Jaguar TCS Racing – Kidlington
- Hitech Grand Prix – Silverstone
- Envision Racing – Silverstone
- Kiro Race Co – Silverstone

== Inactive marques ==
Currently inactive British automotive marques include: Allard, Alvis, Armstrong Siddeley, Austin, Autovia, Daimler, DeLorean, Gilbern, Gordon-Keeble, Healey, Hillman, Humber, Jensen, Jowett, Lanchester, Lea-Francis, Morris, Napier, Reliant, Riley, Rover, Singer, Standard, Sterling, Sunbeam, Sunbeam-Talbot, Talbot, Triumph, TVR, Vanden Plas, Wolseley Motors.

== Dealership groups ==
There has been significant consolidation of car dealerships in the UK, leading to several large and notable dealership groups. As of June 2021, Sytner Group is the largest with a turnover of £4.92 billion.

- Arnold Clark Automobiles
- Carcraft
- Chapelhouse Motor Group
- Ford Retail Group
- Group 1 Automotive (US owned group)
- Inchcape plc
- Jardine Motors Group (part of Hong Kong based Jardine Matheson)
- JCT600
- Listers Group
- Lloyd Motor Group
- Lookers
- Marshall Motor Group
- H.R. Owen
- Park's Motor Group
- Pendragon plc
- Perrys Motor Sales
- Stellantis &You (owned by Stellantis)
- Stoneacre Motor Group
- Swansway Motor Group
- Sytner Group (owned by US company Penske Corporation)
- Vertu Motors
- Wessex Garages

== Car market ==
Despite the loss of mass-market British marques, car models that are built in the UK are generally popular in the UK sales charts, examples being the Nissan Qashqai.

As of 2014 2.45 million cars were sold in the UK, with the Volkswagen Group having a 20.8% share, Ford Motor Company having 13.2% and General Motors having 11.3%. Subcompact and compact cars were the most popular sizes although SUVs were gaining a significant foothold. The Fiat 500 was the best selling A-segment product, Ford Fiesta the best selling in the B-segment, Ford Focus best selling in the C-segment and BMW 3 Series best selling in the D-segment.

In 2019, the best selling car model in the UK was Ford Fiesta followed by Volkswagen Golf and Ford Focus.

== See also ==
- List of automobile manufacturers
- The Society of Motor Manufacturers and Traders
- List of car manufacturers of the United Kingdom
