= Cracraft =

Cracraft is a surname. Notable people with the surname include:

- River Cracraft (Tanner Cracraft, born 1994), American football player
- Joel Cracraft (born 1942), American paleontologist and ornithologist
- James Cracraft (fl. 1999), American historian of Russia
