= Carcraft =

British used car retailer

CARCRAFT IP CO LIMITED
- Industry: Automotive
- Founded: 1951
- Founder: Frank McKee
- Headquarters: Manchester, United Kingdom
- Products: Used Cars; Car Finance
- Owner: Car Finance 247
- Website: www.carcraft.co.uk

Carcraft is a used car online dealership platform originally established in 1951 as a used car hypermarket in Rochdale, Greater Manchester, England, with eleven locations around the country. Stocking cars from Alfa Romeo to Volvo. Carcraft was established by Frank McKee, and was bought out in July 1998 by his sons Noel and Darren McKee. Carcraft was placed into administration in 2015 and was bought by Reg & Louis Rix, owners and management team behind Car Finance 247.

== History ==
Carcraft was established in 1951, by Frank McKee in Rochdale. In July 1998, his sons Noel and Darren McKee bought the business from him in a deal backed by the Royal Bank of Scotland’s Development Capital arm, valuing it at £50 million. In April 2000, Carcraft acquired a car supermarket located in Newport from Car Group for £10 million, whilst Car Group was in receivership.

It also purchased a former Carland store located in Sheffield. In December 2000, Carcraft was put on sale, with a price tag of £200 million.

In December 2005, Carcraft became the first independent second hand vehicle retailer to create and found a contract hire car company. Named ‘All in One leasing’, the business provided services to companies who have small to medium fleets of cars, with Carcraft leasing them new vehicles, then replacing them and selling the used vehicles at its used car supermarkets throughout the country. In October 2006, Carcraft acquired another four sites from Carland, which were located in Chertsey, Enfield, Lakeside, and Stockport.

In April 2014, a management buyout was led by current Chief Executive Robin Bridge, and was backed by Apollo Ventures, for an undisclosed sum. On 30 April 2015, the company was placed into administration, suffering substantial losses and failing to keep up with rival marketing (marketing spend was £100k a week with a return of average sales of two hundred cars a week). Staff were told by the administrators the very same day leaving over five hundred people, with no redundancy pay or notice.

== Change of ownership ==
After being placed into administration, Carcraft was acquired by the Rix brothers, Reg and Louis Rix, who also own Car Finance 247, a firm investigated by the Information Commissioner's Office (ICO) following 912 complaints. They were fined £30,000 after an affiliate partner sent approximately 65,000 spam text messages on the company's behalf without authorisation.

The Carcraft website retained the same domain name as its previous iteration, but its new owners stated that the relaunched business was separate from the former operation. The website operates in partnership with Car Finance 247, allowing customers to search for used cars and arrange finance through the same platform.

== Recognition ==
In April 2011, Carcraft received recognition from Experian, for achieving the number one most visited website for the UK Automotive and Dealership category, earning it an Experian Hitwise Top 10 Award. It also received a Quality Driven Award, for exceptional customer service, awarded by Steve Hodgkinson from Easi Drive.

== Showrooms ==
Carcraft had eleven showrooms located across the United Kingdom. There were centres in the following areas:

- Birtley
- Chertsey
- Enfield
- Knowsley (Merseyside)
- Lakeside
- Leeds
- Manchester (Trafford Centre)
- Newport
- Rochdale
- Sheffield
- Wednesbury
