= Car Finance 247 =

Car Finance 247 Limited
- Trade name: Car Finance 247
- Type: Private
- Industry: Financial services; Credit broker
- Founded: 2006; 20 years ago
- Founder: Louis Rix; Reg Rix
- Headquarters: Manchester, United Kingdom
- Area served: United Kingdom
- Products: Car Finance Broker
- Number of employees: 545
- Website: www.carfinance247.co.uk

Car Finance 247 is a car finance technology platform & credit broker based in Manchester, United Kingdom. The company was founded in 2006 by brothers Reg and Louis Rix and operates as an intermediary between consumers, car dealerships and third-party motor finance providers.

== History ==
Car Finance 247 was founded in Manchester in 2006 by brothers Reg and Louis Rix. Before establishing the company, the brothers had operated an online car classifieds business, which was later sold to RAC.

During the mid-2010s, the company expanded substantially. In 2016, Startups.co.uk reported that Car Finance 247 had more than 320 employees and had recorded a 177% increase in revenue between June 2015 and June 2016.

The company has appeared in the Sunday Times Virgin Fast Track 100. In 2017, it was ranked ninth, its third consecutive appearance in the list.

In 2017, Car Finance 247 moved its workforce to Universal Square in Manchester. Contemporary property coverage reported that the company planned to relocate around 420 employees into approximately 40,000 square feet of office space.

== Operations ==
Car Finance 247 operates as a credit broker rather than a lender. Customers submit finance applications through the company's online platform and may be matched with finance products provided by third-party lenders.

The company has developed technology for quickly processing finance applications at scale, including machine-learning models used to categorise applications, assess risk and analyse customer intent.

In February 2017, Car Finance 247 launched an iOS and Android mobile application. The application allows users to search vehicles advertised by dealers, receive finance quotations, use live chat functionality and contact company representatives about vehicles they were interested in purchasing.

In August 2026, Car Finance 247 announced the opening of its first office outside Manchester, establishing a sales hub in Bournemouth, Dorset. The office, located in Victoria House, Westbourne, opened in September 2026 with an initial team of 12 employees and plans for further expansion.

== Regulatory action ==
In September 2016, the Information Commissioner's Office fined Car Finance 247 £30,000 after an affiliate partner sent approximately 65,000 unsolicited marketing text messages on the company's behalf between August and December 2015.

The messages were sent to people whose details had been obtained from a third party and resulted in more than 900 complaints to the ICO or a spam-reporting service.

Car Finance 247 stated that the messages had been sent by the affiliate without its prior knowledge or authorisation. The ICO concluded that the company had not provided evidence that it had carried out sufficient due diligence to establish that the data had been obtained lawfully and the recipients had consented to receive marketing messages.

Car Finance 247 apologised to those affected and said that the company had ended the relationship with the affiliate and introduced additional procedures for future partnerships.
