= Cabvision =

UK credit card payment provider

Cabvision are a major credit card payment providers in London having originally started as a digital screen network operating exclusively in Licensed Taxis.

Cabvision Limited was sold in 2010 and now forms part of Cabvision Network Ltd which designs, fits and operates payment systems in Licensed Taxis. The company is an "Approved Supplier" of Transport for London and is regulated by the Financial Conduct Authority.

== Payment devices ==
Cabvision Network are the only TfL approved supplier to offer both an integrated with fare meter system and a Mobile Point of Sale system for London that is installed in the taxi. Hardware from Ingencio forms the original offer and the Miura M10 is the "CabPay" system that works via the drivers mobile phone. Outside of London, the CabPay system does not need to be installed into the taxi and can be used independently.

Cabvision has a choice of payment plans to suit a range of drivers, starting from 1.99% + 10p per transaction. Payments are settled next day, 6 days per week.

== Early history ==
Cabvision started in 2000 with the London Millennium golden taxis campaign. A thousand taxis were installed with Cabvision in central London. The creators of Cabvision are media and advertising executives Jonathan Marquis, a former senior advertising director of the Dentsu Group and Peter Da Costa, proprietor of KPM Taxis. Supported by a number of media and technology companies including IBM, Trident Microsystems and Liquid Digital, The passenger was given several choices at the beginning of each journey and may select from a variety of channels or mute. Cabvision was created as an entertainment, infotainment and advertising system, narrowcasting to a captive ABC1 London audience. Advertisers using the system have included Accenture, Barclays Bank and HSBC.

== Media screens ==
Cabvision was a digital information and advertising platform playing multiple channels. Channels were provided in recorded format segmented by commercial breaks. Know London was produced by Cabvision and was the default channel on the network. The Know London channel delivered live news, weather, sport, business and a selection of London centric short films. Cabvision stopped installing screens in London taxis in 2011.

Taxi drivers were paid by Cabvision to run the system in their vehicles.

The system was built into a PC located in the vehicle's boot running the Microsoft Windows XP operating system. The unit is designed to be housed in the new-style TX1, TXII and TX4 hackney carriages and connected to a TFT LCD screen between the fold-down passenger seats behind the driver.

Viewing data was collected and sent to the supplier via GPRS technology, emphasising the system's primary use as an advertising tool

== Similar media systems ==
=== United Kingdom ===
A similar system to Cabvision was licensed to Cabtivate, which was installed in taxis in Edinburgh, Glasgow, Manchester, Birmingham and Bristol. According to the company's website, the system updates remotely without pre-recorded DVDs or video tapes. The driver has no control over the Cabtivate system and individual vehicles can be programmed for specific content. However, the company behind Cabtivate has since experienced financial difficulties and is unlikely to install any further units despite provisional approval from the Public Carriage Office. Accordingly, Cabvision is currently the only system authorised by the PCO operating in London.

Taxi TV is a more basic version of in-taxi TV installed in a number of taxis elsewhere in the United Kingdom, predominantly in Liverpool.

Cabcast is a UK-based firm which offers a 3 tier system, from the basic package up to an advanced system with a management suite. The company website places an emphasis on flexibility with customer add ons and development a major focus. The advanced package features a GPS tracking facility which allows for route tracing of each taxi while the system remains in use.

=== Worldwide ===
Similar units (such as MICE TV) have also been trialed in New York City, Rome and in parts of Canada with varying degrees of success
