= FX4 =

FX4 may refer to:

- Austin FX4, a taxicab by Austin Motor Company
- a trim of the Ford F-150 series of pickup trucks
- FX4, an album by Jake "virt" Kaufman
