= Ford Duratorq engine =

Marketing name of a range of Ford diesel engines first introduced in 2000

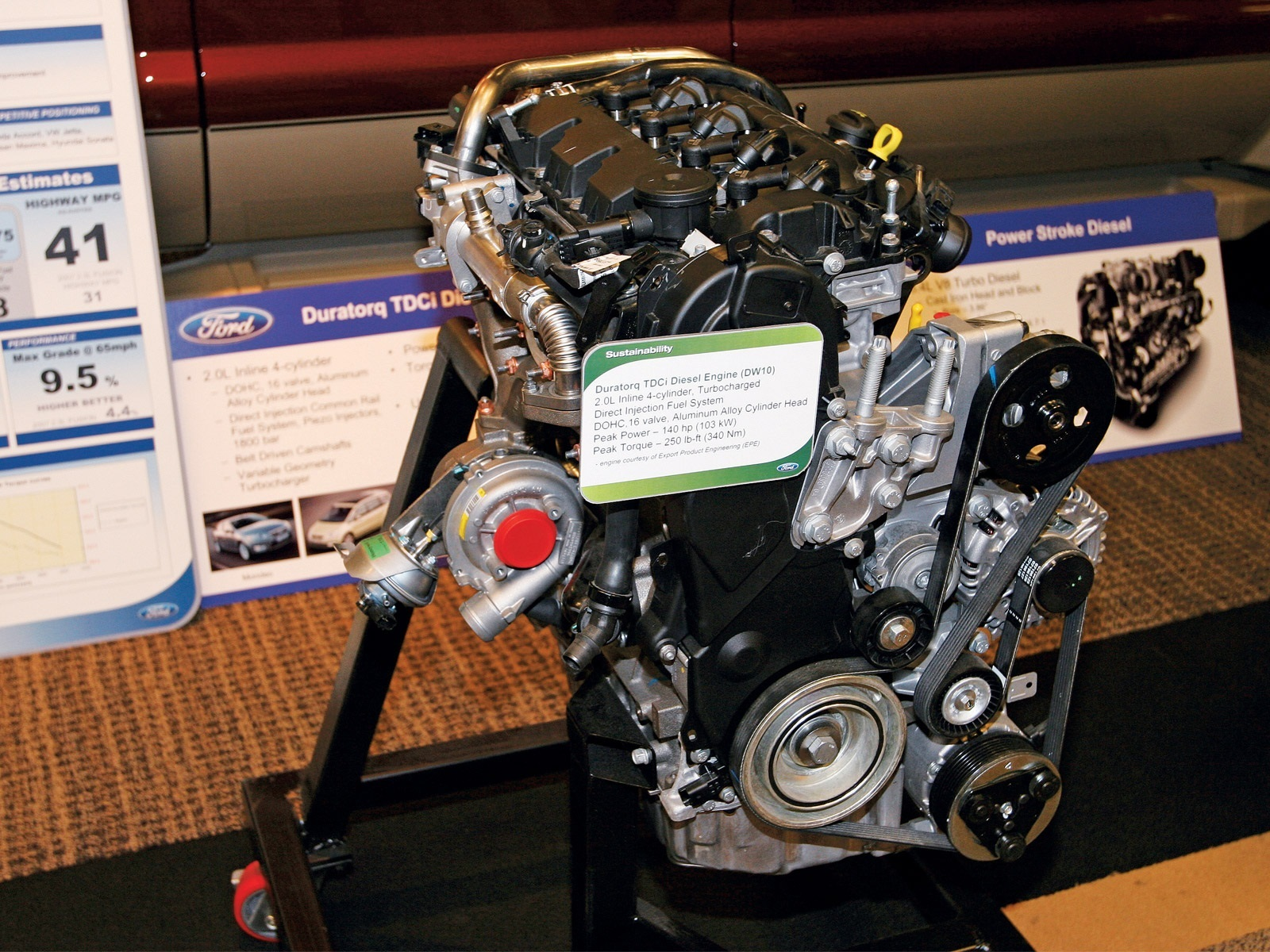

Overview
- Manufacturer: Ford Motor Company
- Production: 2000–2020

Layout
- Configuration: Inline-4, Inline-5, V6, V8
- Displacement: 1.4–4.4 L (1,399–4,367 cc)
- Cylinder bore: 89.9 mm (3.54 in); 93 mm (3.66 in); 96 mm (3.78 in)
- Piston stroke: 92 mm (3.62 in); 94.6 mm (3.72 in); 100.7 mm (3.96 in); 102 mm (4.02 in)
- Valvetrain: SOHC 2 valves x cyl. DOHC 4 valves x cyl.

Combustion
- Turbocharger: BorgWarner KP35 Twin-scroll, Twin-turbo, Variable-geometry with intercooler (on some versions)
- Fuel system: Common rail (Only TDCi) Direct injection
- Management: Delphi, Siemens, Bosch
- Fuel type: Diesel
- Cooling system: Water-cooled

Output
- Power output: 68–270 PS (50–199 kW; 67–266 hp)
- Torque output: 160–640 N⋅m (118–472 lb⋅ft)

Emissions
- Emissions target standard: Euro 5

Chronology
- Predecessor: Endura-D
- Successor: EcoBlue (progressively from 2015)

The Ford Duratorq engine, commonly referred to as Duratorq, is the marketing name of a range of Ford diesel engines introduced in 2000. The larger capacity 5-cylinder units use the Power Stroke branding when installed in North American-market vehicles. The first design, codenamed "Puma" during its development, replaced the older Endura-D unit which had been around since 1984. Commercial versions of the Puma unit replaced Ford's older "2.5Di" type unit used in the Transit, and many other manufacturers' vehicles - most notably the London Taxi and in the Land Rover Defender. Other unrelated units in this range have been developed by Ford and PSA. The TDCi Duratorq engines are available in vehicles from Ford, Jaguar, Land Rover, Volvo and Mazda.

The new EcoBlue diesel engine range, originally codenamed "Panther" and planned to be available in 2.0- and 1.5-litre variants, progressively replaced the Duratorq engines from 2016.

== Engine reference ==
Name	Parent Family	Displacements	Year	Features	Common Applications
HDi/TDCi	DLD ("Tiger")	1.4 L (1,399 cc); 1.6 L (1,560 cc)	2002–present	I4 Twin-scroll turbo in 1,6, 115 PS (85 kW; 113 hp) Common Rail DI	Ford Fiesta Mk5, Ford Fiesta Mk6, Ford Fusion (Europe), Ford Focus Mk2, Ford Focus Mk3, Ford Mondeo Mk3, Ford Mondeo Mk5 Ford C-Max, Ford Figo, Ford Bantam, Ford Transit Connect, Ford Transit Courier, Ford C-MAX, Ford S-MAX, Ford Galaxy, Fiat Scudo, Mazda2, Mazda3, Mazda5, Mini Cooper D, Citroën C2, Citroën C3, Citroën Xsara, Citroën Xsara Picasso, Citroën C4, Citroën C4 Aircross, Citroën C4 Picasso, Citroën C5, Mitsubishi ASX, Peugeot 206, Peugeot 207, Peugeot 208, Peugeot 2008, Peugeot 307, Peugeot 308, Peugeot 3008, Peugeot 407, Peugeot 4008, Peugeot 508, Peugeot 5008, Volvo C30, Volvo S40, Volvo V50, Volvo V40, Citroën Berlingo, Peugeot Partner, Citroën Jumpy, Peugeot Expert, Mini Cooper
TDCi	Endura-DI ("Lynx")	1.8 L (1,753 cc)	1998–present	I4 turbo intercooled SOHC 8-valve	Ford Focus Mk1, Ford Focus Mk2, Ford Mondeo Mk4, Ford C-MAX, Ford Galaxy, Ford S-MAX, Ford Transit Connect
TDCi 16v	ZSD ("Puma")	2.0 L (1,998 cc); 2.2 L (2,198 cc); 2.4 L (2,402 cc); 2.5 L 3.0 L	1999–present	I4 turbo intercooled 16-valve DI	Ford Mondeo Mk3, Ford Transit, Ford Ranger (T6), Ford Everest, Jaguar X-TYPE, Land Rover Defender, LDV, London Taxi TX1, TXII, Citroën Jumper, Peugeot Boxer, Fiat Ducato
HDi/TDCi	PSA DW	2.0 L (1,997 cc)	2004–present	I4 twin-scroll turbo intercooled DOHC 16-valve	Ford Mondeo Mk4, Ford Mondeo Mk5, Ford Focus Mk2, Ford Focus Mk3, Ford C-Max, Ford S-Max, Ford Galaxy, Ford Kuga, Peugeot 307, Peugeot 308, Peugeot 3008, Peugeot 5008, Peugeot 407, Peugeot 607, Citroën C4, Citroën C4 Picasso, Citroën C5, Volvo C30, Volvo S40, Volvo V50, Volvo V70, Volvo S80
HDi/TDCi	PSA DW	2.2 L (2,179 cc)	2005–present	I4 twin-turbo intercooled DOHC 16-valve	Ford Mondeo Mk4, Ford S-Max, Ford Galaxy, Peugeot 407, Peugeot 4007, Peugeot 607, Citroën C5, Citroën C6, Citroën C-Crosser, Land Rover Freelander, Mitsubishi Outlander, Range Rover Evoque
TDCi	"Puma"	3.2 L (3,198 cc)	2006–present	I5 turbo intercooled	Ford Transit, Ford Ranger (T6), Ford Everest, Vivarail D-train, Troller T4.
DT17/DT20	AJ ("Lion")	2.7 L (2,720 cc); 3.0 L (2,993 cc)	2004–present	V6 turbo intercooled DI	Jaguar S-Type, Jaguar XF, Jaguar XJ, Land Rover Discovery, Peugeot/Citroën, Ford Territory, Ford Ranger
?	AJ	3.6 L (3,630 cc); 4.4 L (4,367 cc)	2006–present	V8 turbo intercooled DI	Range Rover

== DLD ==
The inline-four engines are sold under the Duratorq TDCi name by Ford, and as the HDi by Citroën and Peugeot. These are part of the DLD family. Mazda also uses the DLD engine in the Mazda2 and the Mazda3, calling it the MZ-CD or CiTD. The Ford/PSA joint-venture for the production of the DLD was announced in September, 1998.

Officially, there are two families of engines in the range:

- The 1.4L is generally non-intercooled
- The 1.5L derived from the 1.6L
- The 1.6 L always intercooled

Ford later added their unrelated 1.8 L DLD-418 engine to the DLD family, though it is properly part of the Ford Endura engine family.

=== 1.4 "Tiger" ===
The Duratorq DLD-414 (or DV4) is a 1.4 L; 85.4 cu in (1,399 cc) inline-four Turbo–Diesel. Output is 50 kW (68 PS; 67 hp) at 4500 rpm and 160 N⋅m (118 lb⋅ft) at 2000 rpm. This engine was developed in Trémery by Peugeot, as described in the joint-venture agreement with Ford. This engine is built in France, UK and India.

The DV4 is available in two versions:

- One, an 8-valve design, uses a BorgWarner KP35 turbocharger, but no intercooler. This is the same turbocharger as the Renault K9K Diesel. It is Euro III compliant, but received a diesel particulate filter in 2006 to make it Euro IV compliant.
- A second version uses a DOHC 16-valve design, with an intercooled variable-geometry turbocharger. This derivation will no longer be built from 2006, as it will not be able to comply with the Euro IV regulations. It also uses Delphi Automotive's DCR1400 common-rail injection system.

=== 1.5 ===
In 2012, Ford added the 1.5-litre, closely derived from the 1.6-litre engine. Bore was reduced from 75 to 73.5 mm while the stroke remained unchanged 88.3 mm.

=== 1.6 "Tiger" ===
The DLD-416 (or DV6) is a 1.6 L; 95.2 cu in (1,560 cc) 90 or 110 hp (67 or 82 kW; 91 or 112 PS) version also used by Ford, Mazda, Volvo, Mini, Peugeot and Citroën. This particular engine was designed by Peugeot engineers on behalf of PSA and Ford.

=== 1.8 "Lynx" ===
The Duratorq DLD-418 is a 1.8 L (1,753 cc) intercooled common rail diesel engine. It is completely unrelated to the 1.4/1.6 units, and is a development of Ford's 1.8 8v Endura-D engine that saw service through the 1980s and 1990s. However, Ford considers it part of the DLD family, as evidenced by the official "DLD" name.

The Endura-D was heavily revised and updated with a variable-vane turbocharger and a Delphi high-pressure common rail injection system and relaunched in 2001 as the 'DuraTorq TDCi', with the original engine being rebadged 'DuraTorq TDDi'.

This engine, possibly known within Ford as "Kent Diesel", is the last evolution of the 997 cc petrol engine introduced in the 105E Anglia in 1959.

== ZSD ("Puma") ==
Name	Year	Displacement	Maximum power	Maximum torque
ZSD-420	2000–2001	2.0 L; 121.9 cu in (1,998 cc) (?x?) I4	115 PS (85 kW; 113 hp)	280 N⋅m (207 lb⋅ft)
ZSD-420 (Duratorq TDCi)	2001–2002	2.0 L; 121.9 cu in (1,998 cc) (?x?) I4	130 PS (96 kW; 128 hp)	330 N⋅m (243 lb⋅ft)
ZSD-420 (Duratorq TDDi)	2002-	2.0 L; 121.9 cu in (1,998 cc) (?x?) I4	115 PS (85 kW; 113 hp)	280 N⋅m (207 lb⋅ft)
ZSD-422 (Duratorq TDCi)		2.2 L; 134.1 cu in (2,198 cc) (86 mm × 94.6 mm (3.39 in × 3.72 in))	155 PS (114 kW; 153 hp) I4	360 N⋅m (266 lb⋅ft)
ZSD-422 (Duratorq TDCi)	?	2.2 L; 134.1 cu in (2,198 cc) (86 mm × 94.6 mm (3.39 in × 3.72 in)) I4	85 PS (63 kW; 84 hp)	250 N⋅m (184 lb⋅ft)
ZSD-422 (Duratorq TDCi)	?	2.2 L; 134.1 cu in (2,198 cc) (86 mm × 94.6 mm (3.39 in × 3.72 in)) I4	115 PS (85 kW; 113 hp)	300 N⋅m (221 lb⋅ft)
ZSD-422 (Duratorq TDCi)	?	2.2 L; 134.1 cu in (2,198 cc) (86 mm × 94.6 mm (3.39 in × 3.72 in)) I4	140 PS (103 kW; 138 hp)	350 N⋅m (258 lb⋅ft)
ZSD-424 (Duratorq TDCi)	?	2.4 L; 146.6 cu in (2,402 cc) (89.9 mm × 94.6 mm (3.54 in × 3.72 in)) I4	100 PS (74 kW; 99 hp)	285 N⋅m (210 lb⋅ft)
ZSD-424 (Duratorq TDCi)	?	2.4 L; 146.6 cu in (2,402 cc) (89.9 mm × 94.6 mm (3.54 in × 3.72 in)) I4	115 PS (85 kW; 113 hp)	310 N⋅m (229 lb⋅ft)
ZSD-424 (Duratorq TDCi)	?	2.4 L; 146.6 cu in (2,402 cc) (89.9 mm × 94.6 mm (3.54 in × 3.72 in)) I4	140 PS (103 kW; 138 hp)	375 N⋅m (277 lb⋅ft)
2.5 (WLC) (Duratorq TDCi)	2006-	2.5 L; 152.5 cu in (2,499 cc) (93 mm × 92 mm (3.66 in × 3.62 in)) I4	143 PS (105 kW; 141 hp)@3500	330 N⋅m (243 lb⋅ft)@1800
3.0 (WEC) (Duratorq TDCi)	2006-	3.0 L; 180.2 cu in (2,953 cc) (96 mm × 102 mm (3.78 in × 4.02 in)) I4	156 PS (115 kW; 154 hp)@3200	380 N⋅m (280 lb⋅ft)@1800
3.2 (Duratorq TDCi)	2006–	3.2 L; 195.2 cu in (3,198 cc) (89.9 mm × 100.7 mm (3.54 in × 3.96 in)) I5	200 PS (147 kW; 197 hp)	470 N⋅m (347 lb⋅ft)
3.2 (Power Stroke)	2014–2019	3.2 L; 195.2 cu in (3,198 cc) (89.9 mm × 100.7 mm (3.54 in × 3.96 in)) I5	188 PS (138 kW; 185 hp)	470 N⋅m (347 lb⋅ft)

Codenamed Puma during development, these Ford 2.0 L, 2.2 L, and 2.4 L engines are called ZSD. They are produced at the company's Dagenham plant in east London.

Note: the 2.5 and 3.0L "W" engines in above table are NOT Puma engines. They are Mazda designed commercial Diesel engines with no commonality to Puma. The "W" engine family is used in the Asia Pacific Ranger and Everest models currently running out.

=== 2.0 ===
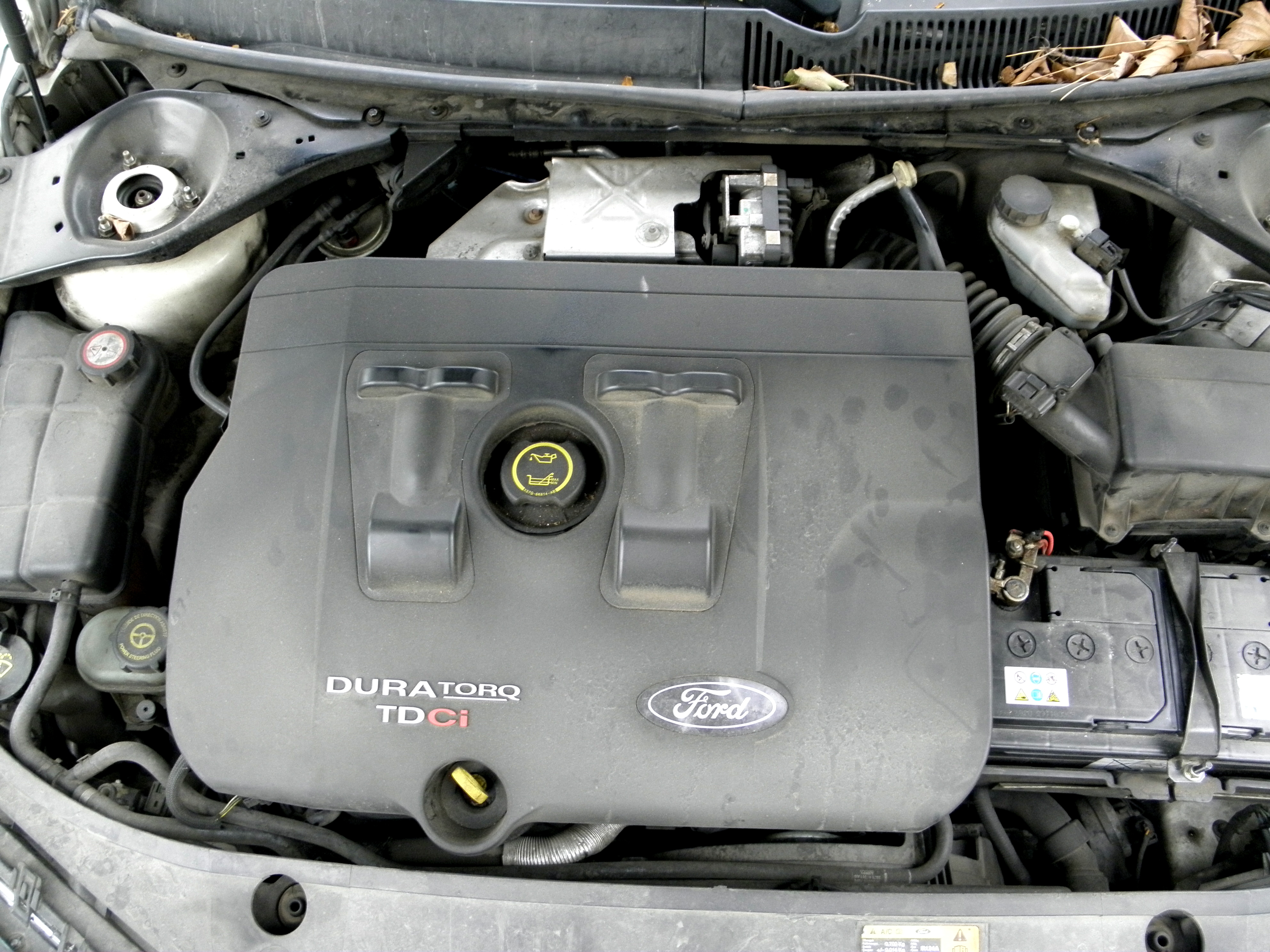
Ford Mondeo Mk3 2.0 TDCi 130, Ford Duratorq 2.0 L (1,998 cc) engine.

Released in 2000, to coincide with the launch of the Mk3 Ford Mondeo, the Duratorq ZSD-420 was initially available as a 2.0 L (1,998 cc) direct injection turbodiesel. Producing 115 PS (85 kW; 113 hp) and 280 N⋅m (207 lb⋅ft) it was a vast improvement over the 1.8 Endura-D powering the Mk2 Mondeo. It featured a 16-valve cylinder head with twin chain driven camshafts and utilised a variable-geometry turbocharger with overboost function.

In late 2001 the engine was fitted with Delphi common rail fuel injection and called the Duratorq TDCi (Turbo Diesel Commonrail injection), with the original unit being renamed the Duratorq TDDi (Turbo Diesel Direct injection). Although generally identical to the original engine, the addition of the common rail system meant power was increased to 130 PS (96 kW; 128 hp), with torque rising to 330 N⋅m (243 lb⋅ft). In 2002 the Duratorq TDDi was replaced by a detuned version of the Duratorq TDCi. Producing 115 PS (85 kW; 113 hp) and 285 N⋅m (210 lb⋅ft), this unit used a fixed geometry turbocharger in place of the variable geometry unit used in the TDDi and 130 PS (96 kW; 128 hp) TDCi.

With 2005 came another detuned version of the TDCi for the Mondeo. Producing 90 PS (66 kW; 89 hp) and 280 N⋅m (207 lb⋅ft), this engine was substantially cheaper than other versions and was mainly targeted at fleet buyers.

Applications:

- Ford Transit 2.0 TDDi & TDCi 75, 85, 100 PS(TDDi) 125 (TDCi) (75 PS (55 kW; 74 hp)/175 N⋅m (129 lb⋅ft)) (86 PS (63 kW; 85 hp)/230 N⋅m (170 lb⋅ft)) (101 PS (74 kW; 100 hp)/250 N⋅m (184 lb⋅ft)) (125 PS (92 kW; 123 hp)/285 N⋅m (210 lb⋅ft))
- 2000–2002 Ford Mondeo 2.0 TD & TDDi, 115 PS (85 kW; 113 hp) and 280 N⋅m (207 lb⋅ft)
- 2001–2007 Ford Mondeo 2.0 TDCi 130, 130 PS (96 kW; 128 hp) and 330 N⋅m (243 lb⋅ft)
- 2002–2007 Ford Mondeo 2.0 TDCi 115, 115 PS (85 kW; 113 hp) and 285 N⋅m (210 lb⋅ft)
- 2005–2007 Ford Mondeo 2.0 TDCi 90, 90 PS (66 kW; 89 hp) and 245 N⋅m (181 lb⋅ft)
- 2003–2009 Jaguar X-Type 2.0d, 130 PS (96 kW; 128 hp) and 330 N⋅m (243 lb⋅ft) DSWDD

=== 2.2 ===
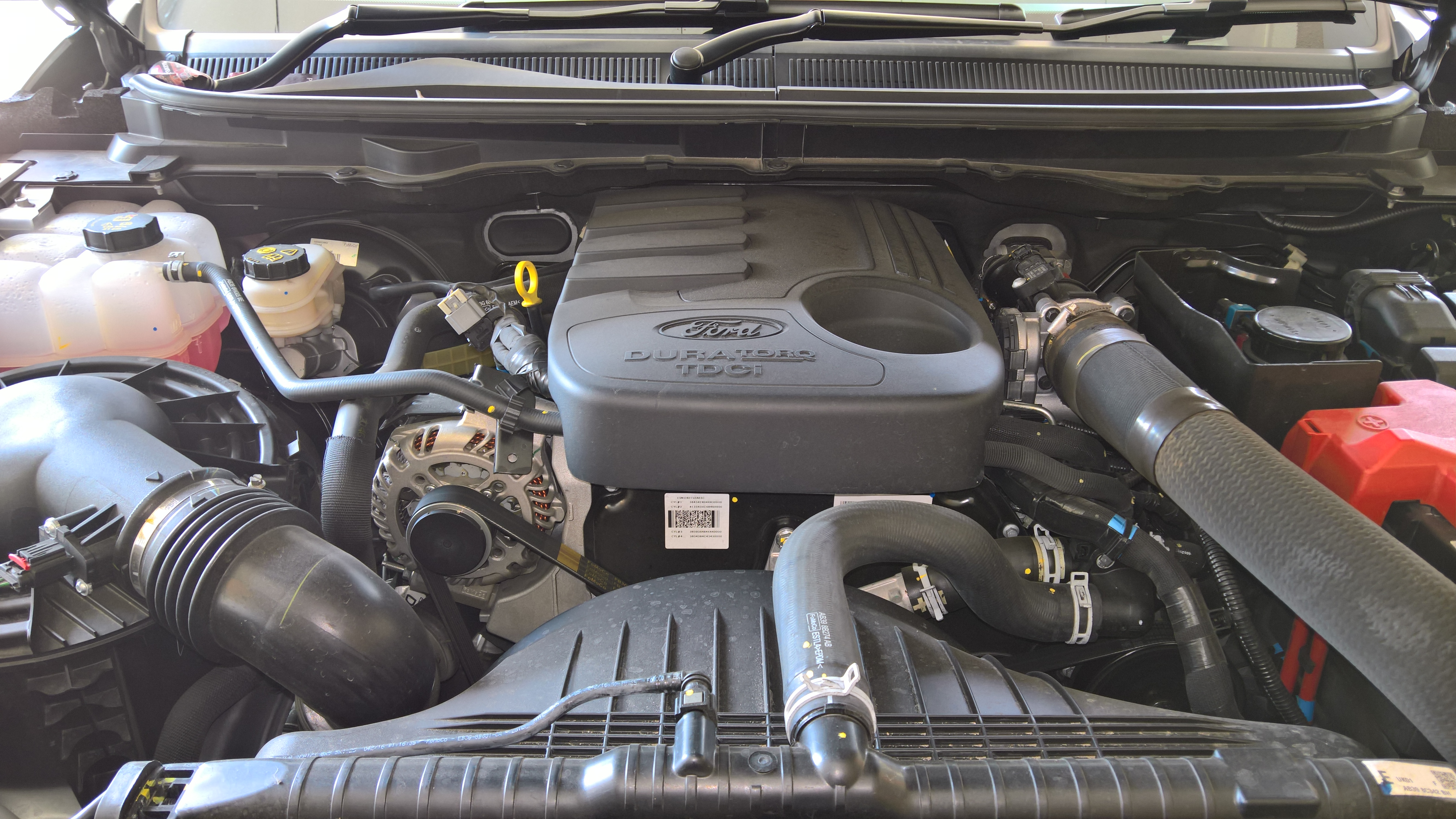
Engine of 2017 Ford Ranger

In 2004, Ford introduced the Duratorq ZSD-422, a 2.2 L (2,198 cc) turbodiesel for top-of-the-range versions of the Mondeo and Jaguar X-Type which produced 155 PS (114 kW; 153 hp). This is unrelated to the PSA DW12 2.2 unit used in Peugeot and Citroën applications.

Applications:

- 2006-2016 Ford Transit
- 2004–2007 Ford Mondeo 2.2 TDCi 155, 155 PS (114 kW; 153 hp) and 355 N⋅m (262 lb⋅ft)
- 2004–2009 Jaguar X-Type
- 2011–2016 Land Rover Defender
- 2011–2021 Ford Ranger T6 & Mazda BT-50 2.2 TDCi / MZ-CD 2.2 110 kW (150 PS; 148 hp) & 375 N⋅m (277 lb⋅ft)
- 2012– 2016 Ford Transit Custom
- 2015–2021 Ford Everest 2.2 TDCi
- 2007-2016 Peugeot Boxer/Citroën Relay

=== 2.4 ===
The 2.4 L; 146.6 cu in (2,402 cc) Duratorq ZSD-424 is a turbocharged and intercooled Diesel. Output is 75 PS (55 kW; 74 hp) to 137 PS (101 kW; 135 hp) and 185 N⋅m (136 lb⋅ft) to 375 N⋅m (277 lb⋅ft).

Applications:

- 2000-2011 Ford Transit
- 2002-2006 LDV Convoy
- 2002-2006 London Taxi TXII
- 2007-2011 Land Rover Defender

=== 2.5 (Mazda WLC) ===
Introduced for the Thailand-built 2007 Ford Ranger (J97U) is a 2.5 L diesel engine. It has a bore and a stroke of 93 mm × 92 mm (3.66 in × 3.62 in). The engine has no commonality to Ford's "Puma" engine or VM Motori. It is a development of the IDI Mazda 2.2L normally aspirated, later 2.5L NA and Turbo and later 2.9L NA, with Bosch common-rail direct injection and a variable geometry turbocharger. The WLC engine code is a Mazda engine code, not being changed for use in the Mazda B-Series clone Ford Ranger. It produces 143 PS (105 kW; 141 hp) at 3500 rpm and 330 N⋅m (243 lb⋅ft) at 1800 rpm.

=== 3.0 (Mazda WEC) ===
A 3.0L Mazda W-engine similar to the 2.5 is also used in the 2007 Ranger as the top of the range. Displacement is increased with a wider bore of 96 mm (3.78 in) and longer stroke of 102 mm (4.02 in). It produces 156 PS (115 kW; 154 hp) at 3200 rpm and 380 N⋅m (280 lb⋅ft) at 1800 rpm.

The W-engine family remains a Mazda engine and has no commonality to "Puma"

=== 3.2 ===
The 3.2 is an inline, 5-cylinder engine used in the Ford Transit, the Ford Ranger (2012–2022), Ford Everest (2015–2022), Mazda BT-50, Troller T4 and the Vivarail D-Train. For the North American-spec Transit, the 3.2L Duratorq is modified to meet American and Canadian emissions standards and is branded as a Power Stroke engine. The 3.2 Power Stroke is rated at 187 PS (138 kW; 184 hp) and 470 N⋅m (347 lb⋅ft), and the DuratorqTDCi, available in Asia and Europe, has a power rating of 200 PS (147 kW; 197 hp) at 3,000 rpm and a torque rating at 470 N⋅m (347 lb⋅ft) between 1,750 and 2,500 rpm.

== 2005 TDCi (PSA DW Based) ==
Continuing the Ford/PSA diesel engine joint-venture, these straight-four engines are sold under the Duratorq TDCi name by Ford, and as the HDi by Citroën and Peugeot. A development of the existing DW10/DW12 engine, the new engines have a traditional belt-driven system, moving away from the chain-driven camshafts of the previous generation (Puma) TDCi engines. Both engines utilise common rail diesel technology and are the result of the fourth phase of the cooperation between PSA and Ford (initiated in 1998).

Both engines utilise all-new, third-generation common rail injection systems. The 2.0 engines utilising a system from Siemens and the 2.2 a system from Bosch. In both systems the injection pressure has been increased to 1,800 bar (26,000 psi). This higher injection pressure, associated with new piezo-electric injectors in which each nozzle is equipped with seven apertures (instead of five previously), allows the number of injections to be multiplied (potentially up to six per cycle) and ensures meticulous uniformity of the diesel injection spray pattern. As a result of this optimised air/diesel mix, combustion is more complete and more uniform, and therefore reduces emissions at source.

=== 2.0 (PSA DW10 Based) ===
The engine was released to Ford models in 2005 Ford Focus, and followed in the 2007 Mk IV Mondeo. It features a 16-valve cylinder head with twin belt driven camshafts (exhaust camshaft connected to cambelt with inlet camshaft indirectly linked via a timing chain) and utilises a variable geometry turbocharger with overboost function. An intercooler is always present, as opposed to some applications of its predecessor.

In the 2005 Focus, engine power output is 136 PS (100 kW; 134 hp); and in the 2007 Mondeo it is offered with 130 PS (96 kW; 128 hp) or 140 PS (103 kW; 138 hp), mated to a manual or 6-speed Aisin TF81 automatic gearbox. In early 2010 this 2.0 unit was updated, as well as the existing 138 bhp (103 kW; 140 PS) version, a new 163 PS (120 kW; 161 bhp) with 340 N⋅m (251 lb⋅ft) of torque was added to the range.

Applications:

- 2003–2018 Ford C-Max 2.0 TDCi, 136 PS (100 kW; 134 hp) and 340 N⋅m (251 lb⋅ft)
- 2005–2018 Ford Focus 2.0 TDCi, 136 PS (100 kW; 134 hp) and 340 N⋅m (251 lb⋅ft)
- 2006–2018 Ford S-Max 2.0 TDCi, 130 PS (96 kW; 128 hp) and 340 N⋅m (251 lb⋅ft)
- 2006–2018 Ford S-Max 2.0 TDCi, 140 PS (103 kW; 138 hp) and 340 N⋅m (251 lb⋅ft)
- 2006–2018 Ford Galaxy 2.0 TDCi, 130 PS (96 kW; 128 hp) and 340 N⋅m (251 lb⋅ft)
- 2006–2018 Ford Galaxy 2.0 TDCi, 140 PS (103 kW; 138 hp) and 340 N⋅m (251 lb⋅ft)
- 2015–2018 Ford Galaxy 2.0 TDCi, 213 PS (157 kW; 210 hp) and 450 N⋅m (332 lb⋅ft)
- 2007–2014 Ford Mondeo 2.0 TDCi, 140 PS (103 kW; 138 hp) and 320 N⋅m (236 lb⋅ft)
- 2007–2010 Ford Mondeo 2.0 TDCi, 160 PS (118 kW; 158 hp) and 340 N⋅m (251 lb⋅ft)
- 2008–2019 Ford Kuga 2.0 TDCi, 136 PS (100 kW; 134 hp) and 320 N⋅m (236 lb⋅ft)
- 2008–2013 Ford Kuga 2.0 TDCi, 163 PS (120 kW; 161 hp) and 340 N⋅m (251 lb⋅ft)
- 2010–2014 Ford Mondeo 2.0 TDCi, 163 PS (120 kW; 161 hp) and 340 N⋅m (251 lb⋅ft)
- 2014–2018 Ford Mondeo 2.0 TDCi, 150 PS (110 kW; 148 hp) and 350 N⋅m (258 lb⋅ft)
- 2014–2018 Ford Mondeo 2.0 TDCi, 180 PS (132 kW; 178 hp) and 400 N⋅m (295 lb⋅ft)
- 2015–2018 Ford Mondeo 2.0 TDCi, 210 PS (154 kW; 207 hp) and 450 N⋅m (332 lb⋅ft)

Other Applications:

- 2004–2007 Peugeot 307 2.0 HDi, 136 PS (100 kW; 134 hp) and 340 N⋅m (251 lb⋅ft)
- 2005–2010 Peugeot 407 2.0 HDi, 136 PS (100 kW; 134 hp) and 340 N⋅m (251 lb⋅ft)
- 2005–2011 Peugeot 607 2.0 HDi, 136 PS (100 kW; 134 hp) and 340 N⋅m (251 lb⋅ft)
- 2006–2014 Peugeot 807 2.0 HDi, 136 PS (100 kW; 134 hp) and 340 N⋅m (251 lb⋅ft)
- 2008–2013 Peugeot 308 2.0 HDi, 136 PS (100 kW; 134 hp) and 340 N⋅m (251 lb⋅ft)
- 2011–2023 Peugeot 508 2.0 HDi, 165 PS (121 kW; 163 hp) and 340 N⋅m (251 lb⋅ft)
- 2004–2010 Volvo C30/C70/S40/V50 2.0 D, 136 PS (100 kW; 134 hp) and 320 N⋅m (236 lb⋅ft) (called D4204T)
- 2007–2010 Volvo S80/V70 2.0 D, 136 PS (100 kW; 134 hp) and 340 N⋅m (251 lb⋅ft) (called D4204T)

In April 2008 Ford fitted this engine to the Mk IV Mondeo, soon following in the Ford S-Max and Ford Galaxy. The engine was re-engineered and built by PSA in Tremery. It features a 16-valve cylinder head with twin belt driven camshafts and utilises a variable geometry turbocharger with overboost function, rather than the twin turbo approach of Peugeot and Citroën. The result is 175 PS (129 kW; 173 hp) with 400 N⋅m (295 lb⋅ft) of torque, although 420 N⋅m (310 lb⋅ft) is temporarily available thanks to the transient overboost function. Land Rover used this engine in the Freelander 2 and Range Rover Evoque.

In 2010 Ford and PSA revised the engine with a new turbocharger and a new power output of 200 PS (147 kW; 197 hp) with a torque of 420 N⋅m (310 lb⋅ft) and 450 N⋅m (332 lb⋅ft) at overboost conditions while the emissions are at Euro 5 level.

Applications:

- 2008–2010 Ford Mondeo 2.2 TDCi, 175 PS (129 kW; 173 hp) and 400 N⋅m (295 lb⋅ft)
- 2008–2015 Ford S-Max 2.2 TDCi, 175 PS (129 kW; 173 hp) and 400 N⋅m (295 lb⋅ft)
- 2008–2015 Ford Galaxy 2.2 TDCi, 175 PS (129 kW; 173 hp) and 400 N⋅m (295 lb⋅ft)
- 2010–2015 Ford Mondeo 2.2 TDCi, 200 PS (147 kW; 197 hp) and 420 N⋅m (310 lb⋅ft) (450 N⋅m (332 lb⋅ft) at overboost)

Other applications:

- 2011–2015 Range Rover Evoque 2.2 eD4, 150 PS (110 kW; 148 hp) and 400 N⋅m (295 lb⋅ft)
- 2011–2015 Range Rover Evoque 2.2 SD4, 190 PS (140 kW; 187 hp) and 430 N⋅m (317 lb⋅ft)
- 2014–2015 Land Rover Discovery Sport 2.2 SD4, 190 PS (140 kW; 187 hp) and 430 N⋅m (317 lb⋅ft)
- 2011–2014 Land Rover Freelander 2 2.2 eD4, 150 PS (110 kW; 148 hp) and 400 N⋅m (295 lb⋅ft)
- 2006–2014 Land Rover Freelander 2 2.2 TD4, 160 PS (118 kW; 158 hp) and 400 N⋅m (295 lb⋅ft)
- 2006–2014 Land Rover Freelander 2 2.2 SD4, 190 PS (140 kW; 187 hp) and 430 N⋅m (317 lb⋅ft)
- 2011–2012 Jaguar XF 2.2 TDi4 ,190 PS (140 kW; 187 hp) and 450 N⋅m (332 lb⋅ft)
- 2012–2015 Jaguar XF 2.2 TDi4 ,200 PS (147 kW; 197 hp) and 450 N⋅m (332 lb⋅ft)
- 2006–2010 Citroën C5 2.2 HDi, 172 PS (127 kW; 170 hp) and 370 N⋅m (273 lb⋅ft)
- 2006–2010 Citroën C6 2.2 HDi, 172 PS (127 kW; 170 hp) and 370 N⋅m (273 lb⋅ft)
- 2006–2010 Citroën C8 2.2 HDi, 172 PS (127 kW; 170 hp) and 370 N⋅m (273 lb⋅ft)
- 2006–2012 Citroën C-Crosser 2.2 HDi, 160 PS (118 kW; 158 hp) and 370 N⋅m (273 lb⋅ft)
- 2006–2010 Fiat Ulysse 2.2 D Multijet, 172 PS (127 kW; 170 hp) and 370 N⋅m (273 lb⋅ft)
- 2007–2010 Peugeot 407 2.2 HDi, 172 PS (127 kW; 170 hp) and 370 N⋅m (273 lb⋅ft)
- 2007–2010 Peugeot 607 2.2 HDi, 172 PS (127 kW; 170 hp) and 370 N⋅m (273 lb⋅ft)
- 2007–2010 Peugeot 807 2.2 HDi, 172 PS (127 kW; 170 hp) and 370 N⋅m (273 lb⋅ft)
- 2007–2012 Peugeot 4007 2.2 HDi, 160 PS (118 kW; 158 hp) and 370 N⋅m (273 lb⋅ft)
- 2007–2012 Mitsubishi Outlander 2.2 HDi, 160 PS (118 kW; 158 hp) and 370 N⋅m (273 lb⋅ft)

== V6 ==
=== AJD-V6/DT17 ===
The 2.7 L (2,720 cc) V6 is built by Ford and Jaguar Cars at their Dagenham facility, and was designed by Ford engineers at their Dunton and Whitley product development centres. It is called AJD-V6 by Jaguar and DT17 by PSA Peugeot Citroën.

Ford and PSA extended their Diesel engine joint-venture in October, 1999, to include this V6 engine.

Applications:

- 2006–2009 Citroën C6 2.7 V6 HDi, 204 PS (150 kW; 201 hp) and 440 N⋅m (325 lb⋅ft)
- 2008–2009 Citroën C5 2.7 V6 HDi, 204 PS (150 kW; 201 hp) and 440 N⋅m (325 lb⋅ft)
- 2004–2008 Jaguar S-Type 2.7 DV6, 204 PS (150 kW; 201 hp) and 440 N⋅m (325 lb⋅ft)
- 2005–2010 Jaguar XJ TDVi 2.7, 204 PS (150 kW; 201 hp) and 440 N⋅m (325 lb⋅ft)
- 2008–2009 Jaguar XF 2.7D, 204 PS (150 kW; 201 hp) and 440 N⋅m (325 lb⋅ft)
- 2005–2010 Land Rover Discovery Tdv6, 190 PS (140 kW; 187 hp) and 440 N⋅m (325 lb⋅ft)
- 2006–2009 Land Rover Range Rover Sport Tdv6, 190 PS (140 kW; 187 hp) and 440 N⋅m (325 lb⋅ft)
- 2005–2012 Peugeot 407 Coupé 2.7 V6 HDi, 204 PS (150 kW; 201 hp) and 440 N⋅m (325 lb⋅ft)
- 2004–2010 Peugeot 407 Touring 2.7 V6 HDi, 204 PS (150 kW; 201 hp) and 440 N⋅m (325 lb⋅ft)
- 2005–2011 Peugeot 607 2.7 V6 HDi, 204 PS (150 kW; 201 hp) and 440 N⋅m (325 lb⋅ft)
- 2011–2016 Ford Territory 2.7 V6 TCDi, 190 PS (140 kW; 187 hp) and 440 N⋅m (325 lb⋅ft)

== V8 ==
=== AJD-V8 ===
The 3.6L V8 is built at Ford's engine plant in Dagenham, Essex. It is a twin-turbocharged Diesel V8 producing 270 PS (199 kW; 266 hp) and 640 N⋅m (472 lb⋅ft). Production began in April 2006. It is closely related to the 2.7L V6 version (same bore & stroke) and was designed at Ford Otosan's R&D Center in Gebze, Turkey and Ford's Dagenham Diesel Centre product development site, with input from Land Rover powertrain team. A 4.4 litre variant that produces 250 kW (340 PS; 335 hp) and 700 N⋅m (516 lb⋅ft) is built at Ford's Chihuahua Engine plant in Mexico.

Applications (4.4 L variant):

- 2010–2020 Land Rover Range Rover
- 2013–2020 Land Rover Range Rover Sport

== See also ==
- List of Ford engines
- British Rail Class 230
