= Austin FX4 =

Motor vehicle model used as a London taxi

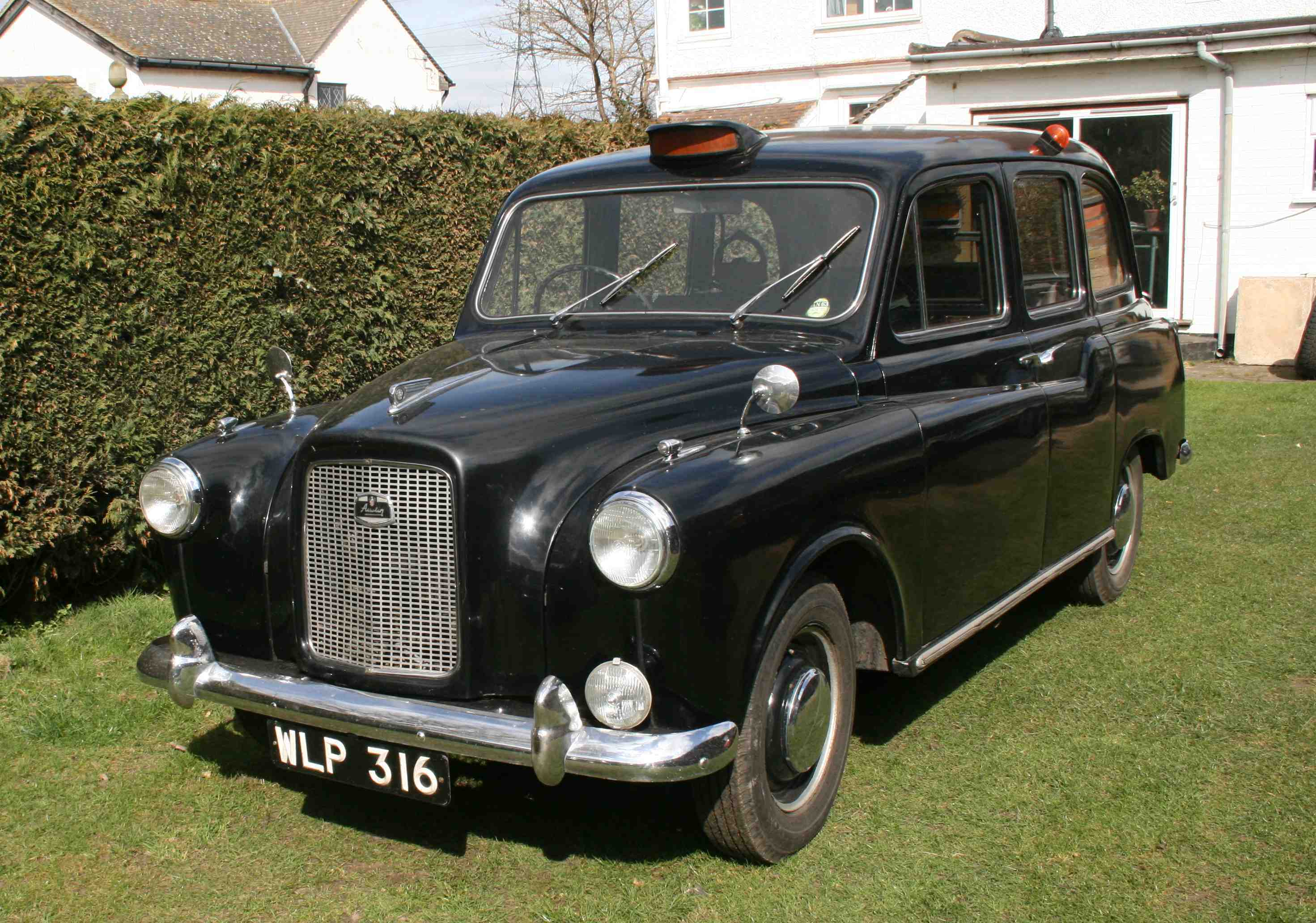
- 1962 Austin FX4

Overview
- Manufacturer: British Motor Corporation (1958–1968); British Leyland (1968–1982); Carbodies/LTI (1982–1997)
- Production: 1958–1997
- Assembly: United Kingdom: Coventry, England
- Designer: Eric Bailey

Body and chassis
- Body style: 4-door saloon

Dimensions
- Wheelbase: 2,810 mm (110.6 in)
- Length: 4,570 mm (179.9 in)
- Width: 1,740 mm (68.5 in)
- Height: 1,770 mm (69.7 in)
- Kerb weight: 1,600 kg (3,527 lb)

Chronology
- Predecessor: Austin FX3
- Successor: LTI TX1

The Austin FX4 is a hackney carriage that was produced from 1958 until 1997. It was sold by Austin from 1958 until 1982, when Carbodies, who had been producing the FX4 for Austin, took over the intellectual rights to the car. Carbodies only produced the FX4 for two years, until 1984, when London Taxis International took over rights and continued producing it until 1997. In all, more than 75,000 FX4s were built. Over its lifetime, the FX4 increasingly became regarded as a design classic, and a visual icon of London recognised throughout the world, to the point where its eventual successors - the TX-series and the current LEVC TX - continue the FX4's basic styling cues and overall aesthetic.

== Design and launch ==
The FX4 London taxi was the successor to the Austin FX3, produced between 1948 and 1958, and in its day, the FX4 the most widely used taxi in London. Like the FX3, the FX4 was designed by Austin in collaboration with Mann & Overton, the London taxi dealership that commissioned it (and paid for half of its cost) and Carbodies, the coachbuilder that built the body and assembled the cab ready for sale. The design team included Albert Moore from Austin's engineering division, Jack Hellberg from Carbodies and David Southwell of Mann & Overton. The original design was by Austin's Eric Bailey and it was engineered for production by Carbodies' Jake Donaldson. It would be the first London taxi to go into production that had four doors, since earlier London taxis had featured a luggage platform that was open to the elements on the pavement/sidewalk side in lieu of a front passenger seat.

Like the FX3, the FX4 had a separate chassis, but with independent front suspension and dual-circuit hydraulic brakes. FX4 front steering feature Ackermann steering geometry which allowed the car to make U-turns in just 7.6 m (25 ft), a requirement for the narrow roads of London.

The first FX4, registration number VLW 431, was delivered in July 1958 and went on test with York Way Motors. The official launch was later that year at the Commercial Motor Exhibition at the Earls Court Exhibition Centre, with an order worth £24 million (equivalent to £488,670,000 in 2025) for 2,000 FX4s placed at the show.

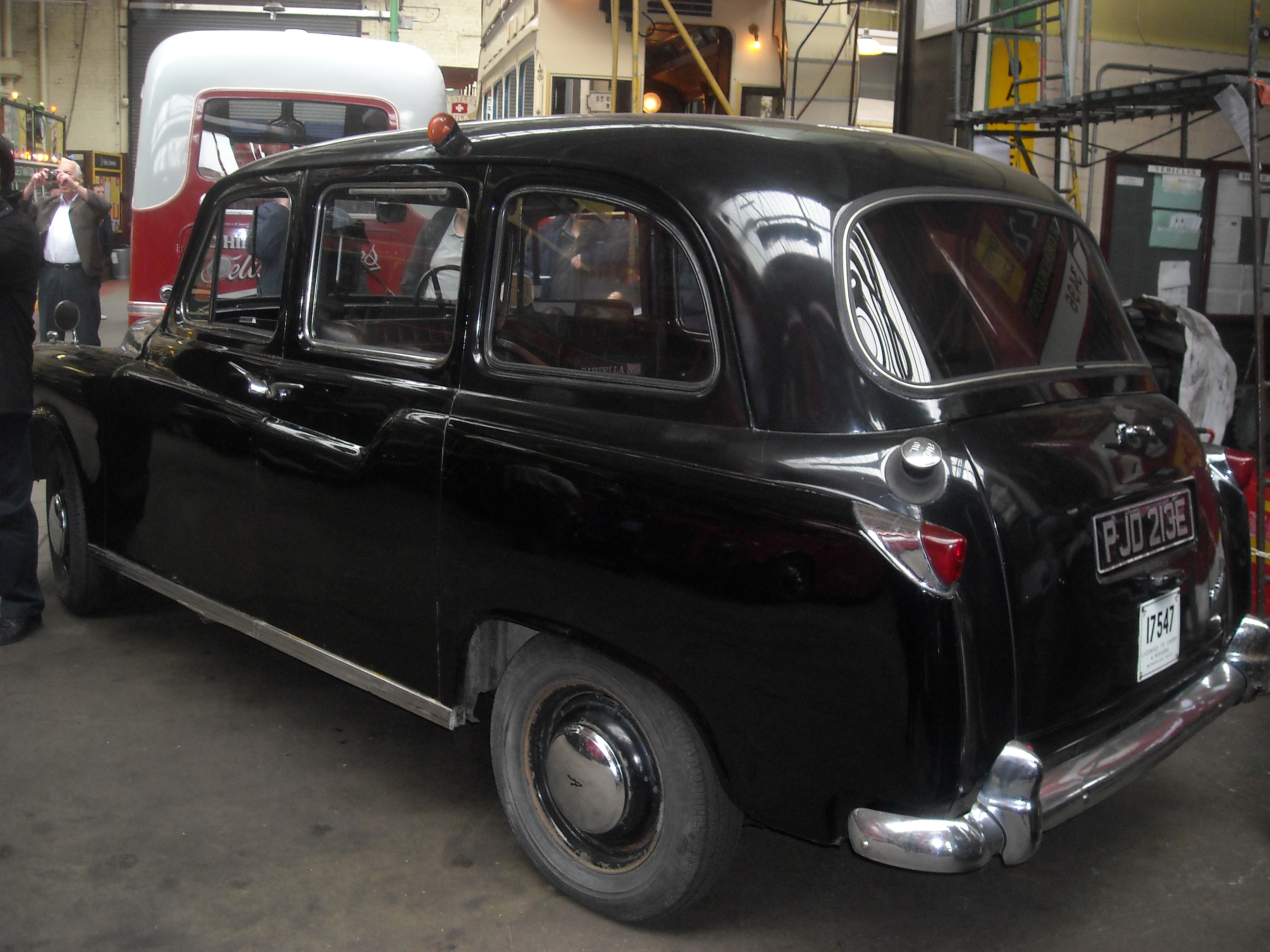
Pre-1971 FX4 with "rabbit ear" indicators on the roof

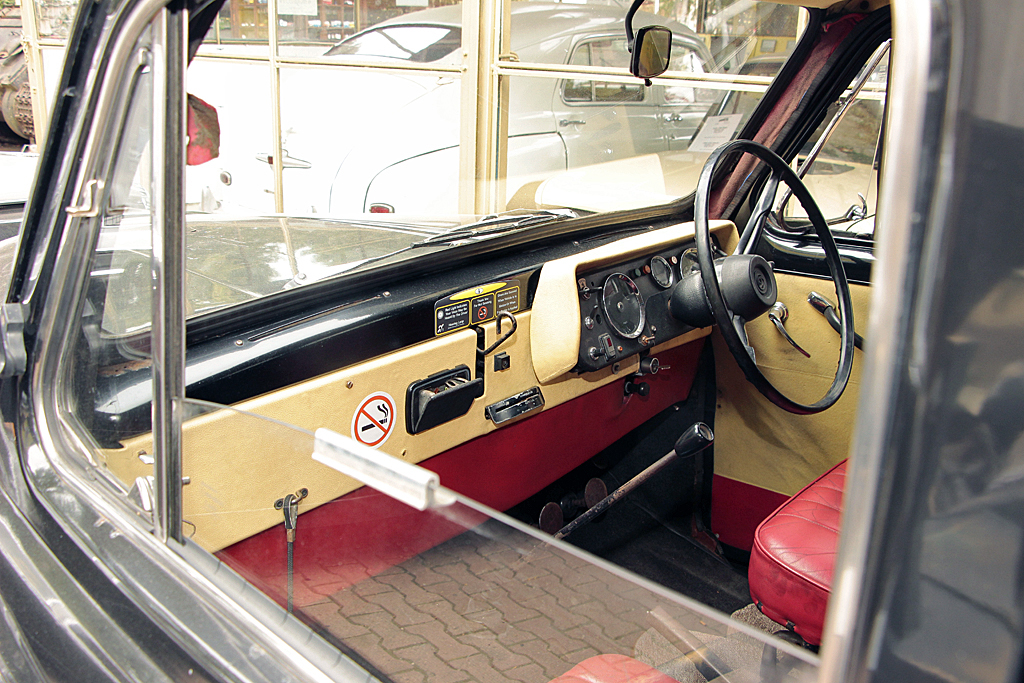
1965 FX4 Dashboard

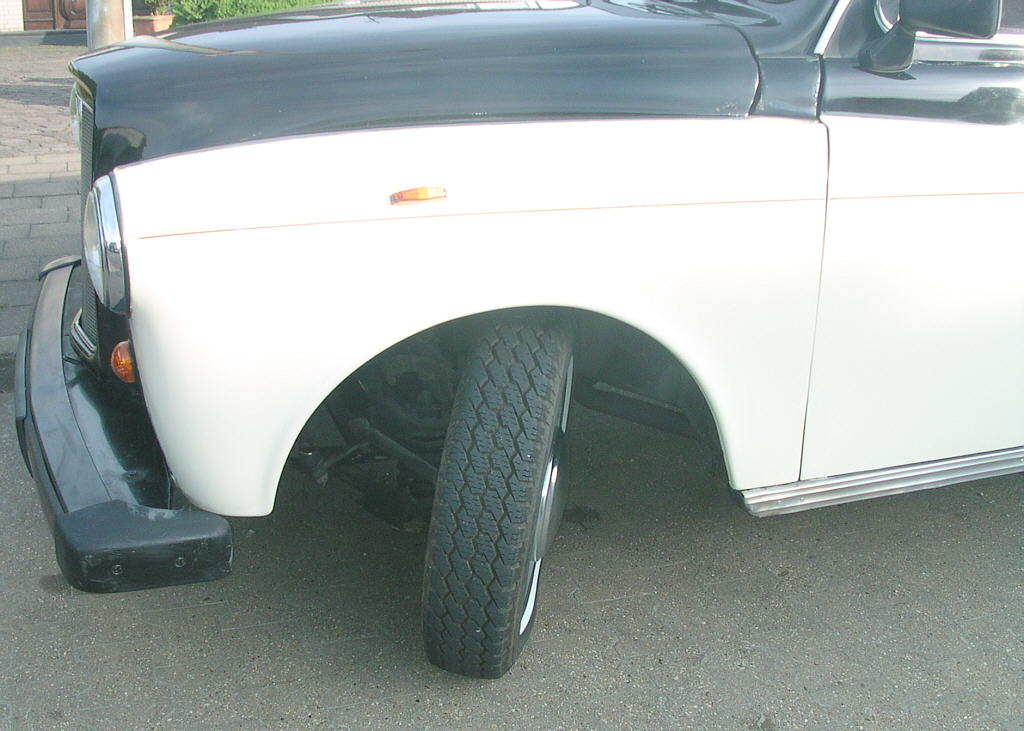
Demonstration of Ackermann steering geometry

== Austin era ==
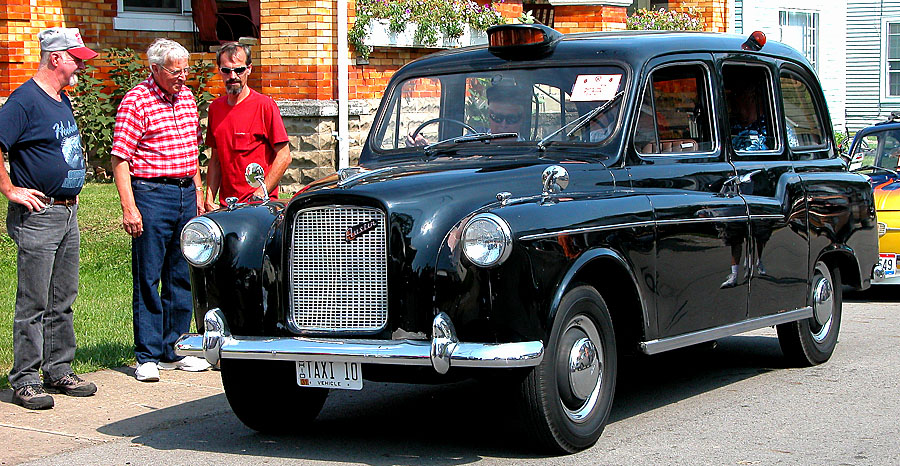
1958–1968 FX4

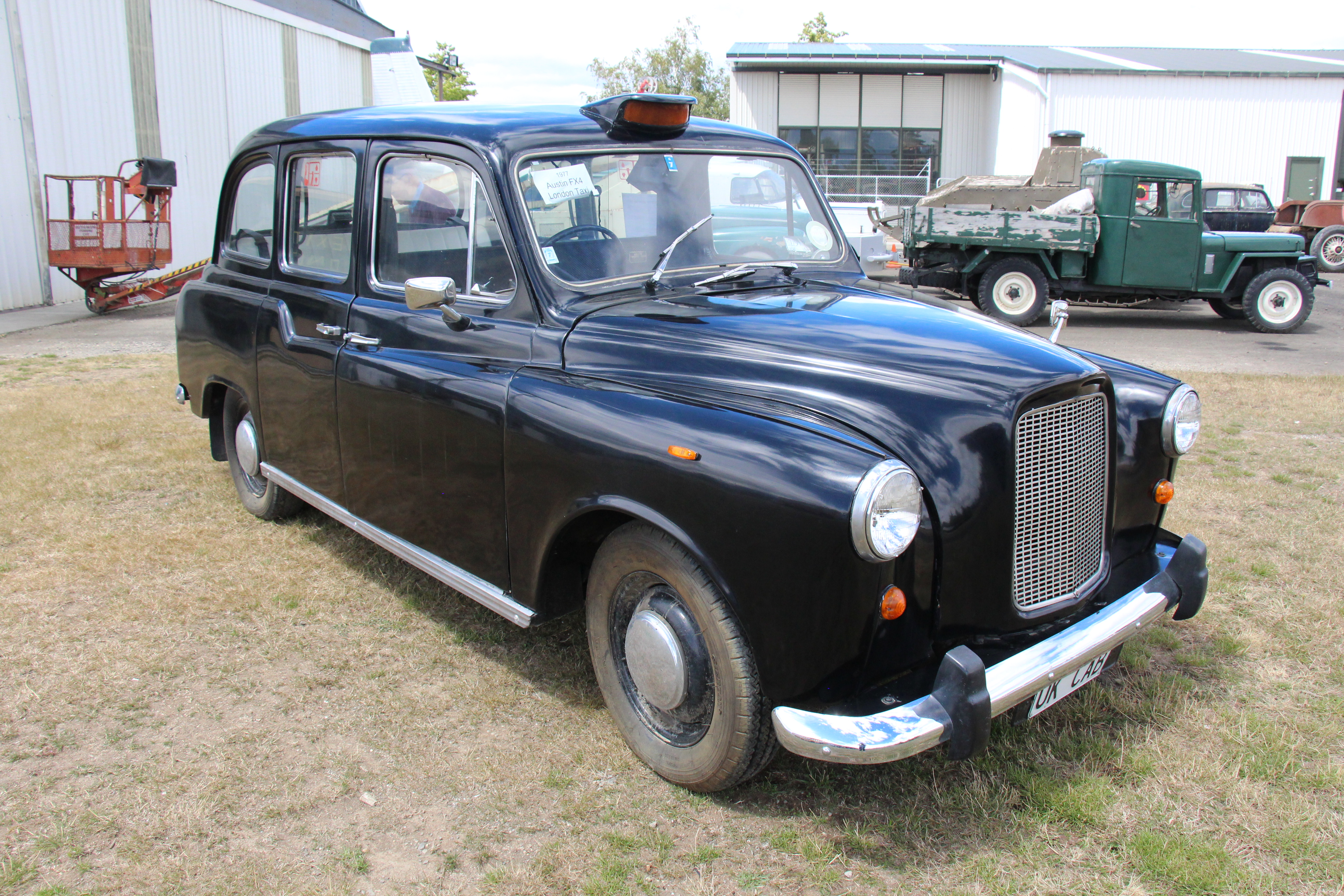
1977 FX4

=== FX4 ===
The first model of FX4 was fitted with a 2178 cc BMC diesel engine and a Borg-Warner automatic transmission. This diesel engine was based on the gasoline Austin A70 engine. In 1961, the manual transmission from the Austin Gipsy was added as an option. From 1962, the Austin 2199 cc petrol engine was available. However, almost all FX4 taxis were fitted with a Diesel engine.

With the sudden demise of the intended replacement in 1969, the cab was revised and updated to address shortcomings of the original. The original Austin design had a small rear light cluster and roof-mounted turn indicators (commonly known as "bunny ears"). On the revised model, the rear wings were modified with less prominent tailfins to accept the taillights and turn indicators from the MkII Austin 1100/1300. Front indicators were also provided below the headlights and repeater indicators fitted to the front wings. and "bunny ears" were abandoned. More important to the drivers of the FX4, the interior was also revised. Sound deadening, black vinyl seats and an altered partition (with an additional 4 inches of legroom) were warmly welcomed.

=== FX4D ===
In 1971, the 2178 cc diesel engine was replaced by a larger, 2520 cc version. This engine proved to be better for use with an automatic transmission and gradually fewer cabs with manual gearboxes were sold. The petrol engine was discontinued in 1973. This model was available from 1971 through 1982.

In 1973, Carbodies' owner BSA, by now confronting imminent bankruptcy, was bought by Manganese Bronze Holdings, who were happy to continue making the FX4. Detail changes, such as burst-proof door locks and push-button door handles, safety steering and moulded rubber overriders (designed because the original tooling for the chrome overriders had worn out) were implemented. BLMC were in turmoil themselves by this time, so while on paper they were involved with the FX4, in reality they did little more than rubber stamp changes that Carbodies undertook.

== Carbodies era ==
=== FX4R ===
In 1982, Carbodies, who had been producing the FX4 for Austin and Mann & Overton, took over the cab's intellectual property rights when British Leyland, Austin's parent company, lost interest in it; Carbodies thereafter produced it under their own name. The old Austin engine was no longer available due to the closure of the British Leyland engine plant at Courthouse Green, so Carbodies selected the Land Rover 2286 cc diesel engine in its place and also offered the similar-sized Land Rover petrol engine as an option. The new model was branded the FX4R, with R standing for 'Land Rover engined'. The FX4R had some improvements over the previous FX4 models, including power steering, full servo brakes, a top speed of 85 miles per hour (137 km/h) and lockable rear doors controlled by the driver, but its performance and reliability were poor and the cab gained a bad reputation.

Some proprietors replaced the Land Rover engine with the Perkins/Mazda 2977 cc diesel, which improved the performance of the cab dramatically. Whilst powerful and reliable, the Perkins conversion gained a reputation for being noisy at idle and, mistakenly, for causing cracks in the chassis. The chassis problem, which was also occurring on late model Austins, was traced to a manufacturing fault.

=== FX4Q ===
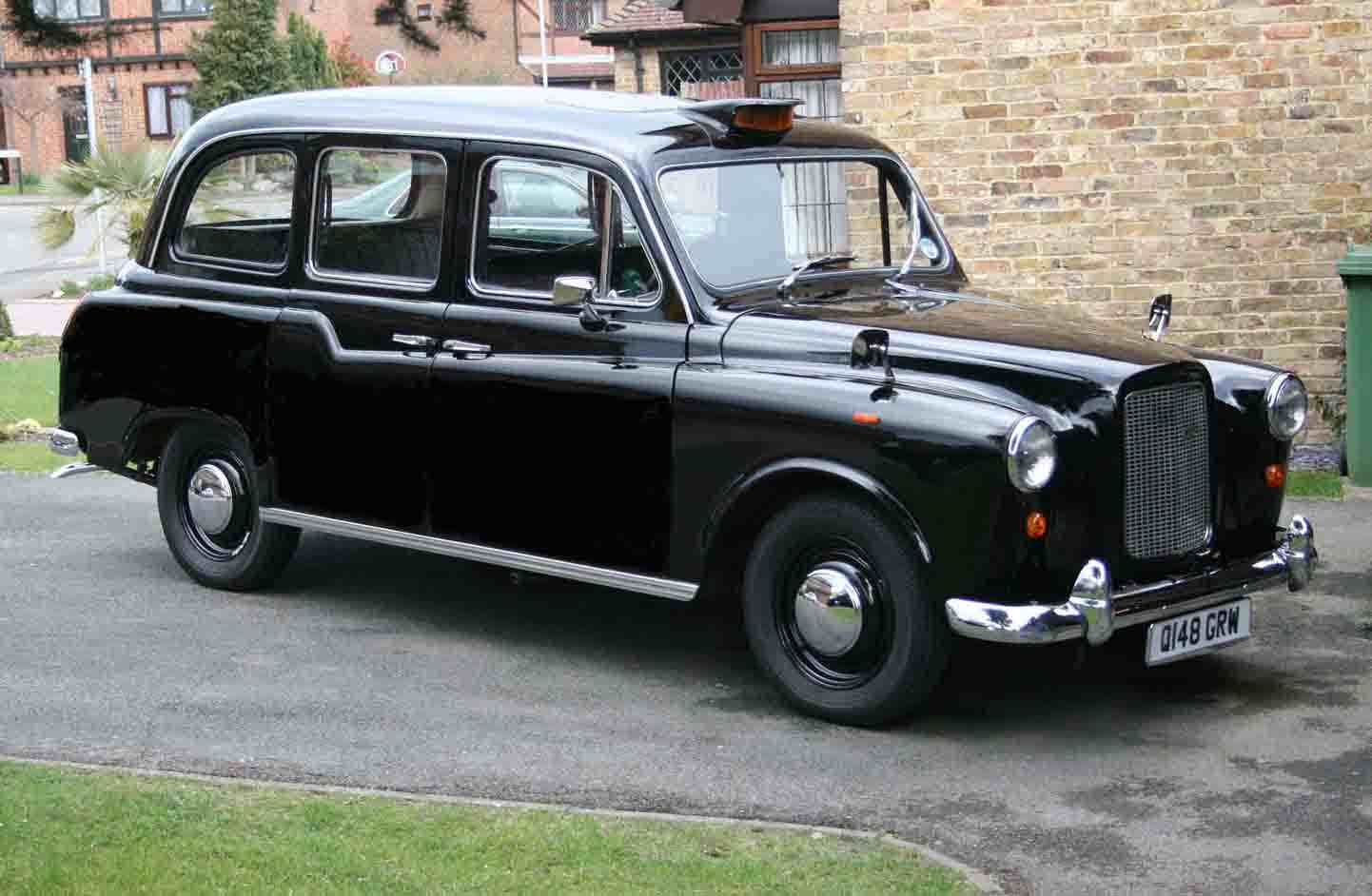
1985 FX4Q

In order to regain lost sales due to the FX4R's failure, Carbodies took old chassis and suspension components and refurbished them, fitting new bodywork and the original-type 2520 cc diesel engines re-imported from India. Because these vehicles used refurbished chassis and suspension components, they were required to have a registration mark starting with the letter Q rather than the current year letter and thus this model was known as the FX4Q. All were fitted with automatic gearboxes, but not the power steering fitted to the FX4R. Sold by the dealer Rebuilt Cabs Ltd, they were marginally cheaper than the FX4R.

== LTI era ==
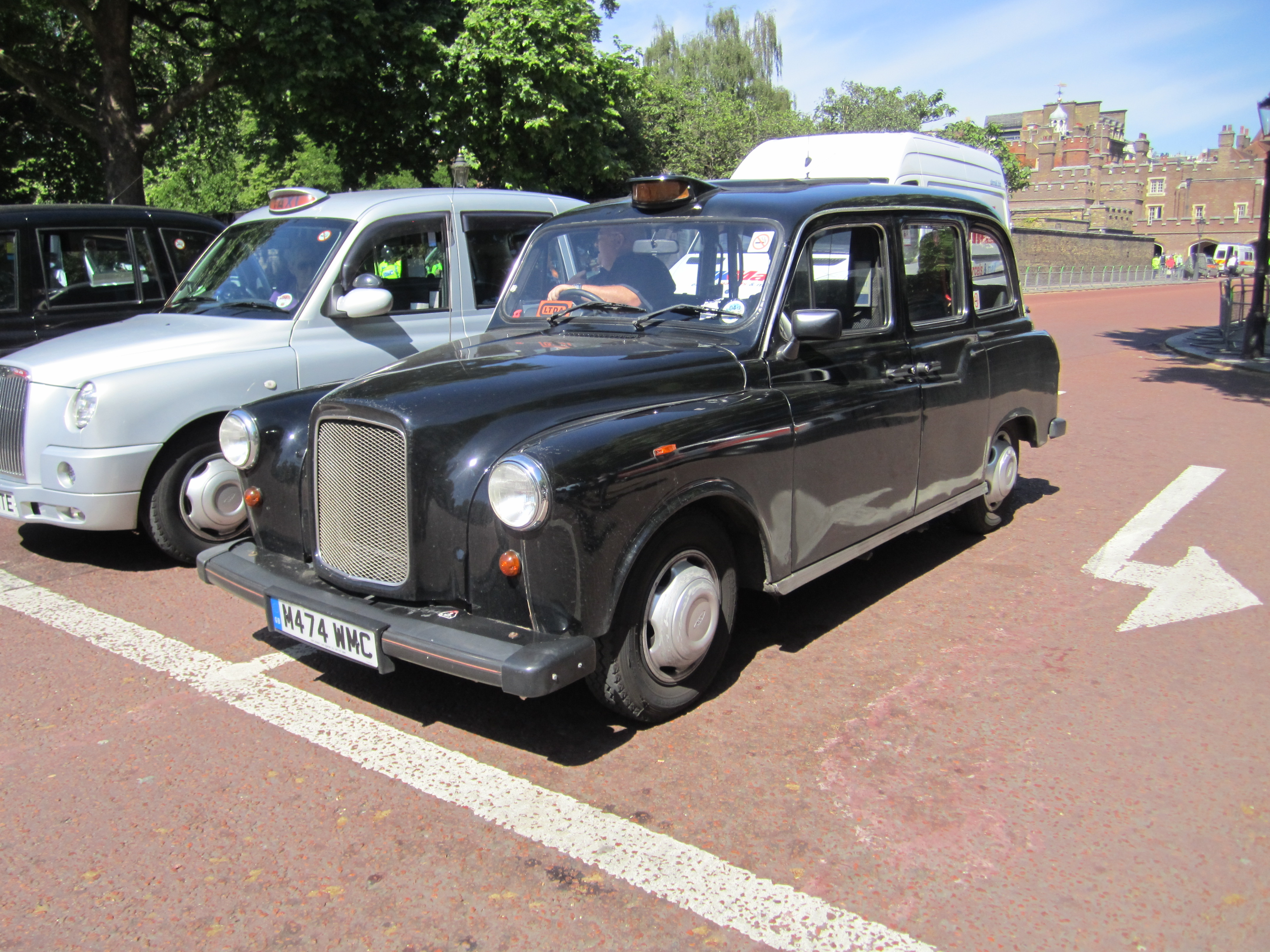
1995 model

=== FX4S ===
In 1984, London Taxis International (LTI) was formed after Manganese Bronze Holdings bought the London taxi dealers Mann & Overton. LTI replaced the 2286 cc Land Rover diesel engine with the new 2495 cc version. The new model was called the FX4S. New rocker switches replaced the old toggle switches on the dashboard, the wipers were controlled by a stalk on the steering column and draught proofing was added to the bottoms of the doors and black rolled steel bumpers fitted, but basically it was an updated version of the cab that had been around for almost 30 years. At this time, Carbodies were developing a replacement for the FX4, the CR6, which is why this 'stopgap' FX4S was introduced. However, the CR6 was abandoned in 1985 and MBH decided to carry on making the FX4 until such time as it could fund a new cab.

=== FX4S-Plus ===
The FX4S was superseded in 1987 by the FX4S-Plus, which had a rear compartment redesigned to allow five passengers, the trim changed to grey and a new grey plastic moulded dashboard was fitted, which featured the instrument cluster and switches from the Austin Metro.

=== FX4W ===
The Department for Transport was keen to see wheelchair accessible taxis and the FX4W wheelchair conversion, which was available from early 1986, enabled the FX4 to provide that facility. In this, the kerb side passenger door was made capable of opening 180° and the nearside part of the partition could be moved forward to accommodate the rearward facing wheelchair in place of the nearside tip-up seat.

=== Fairway ===
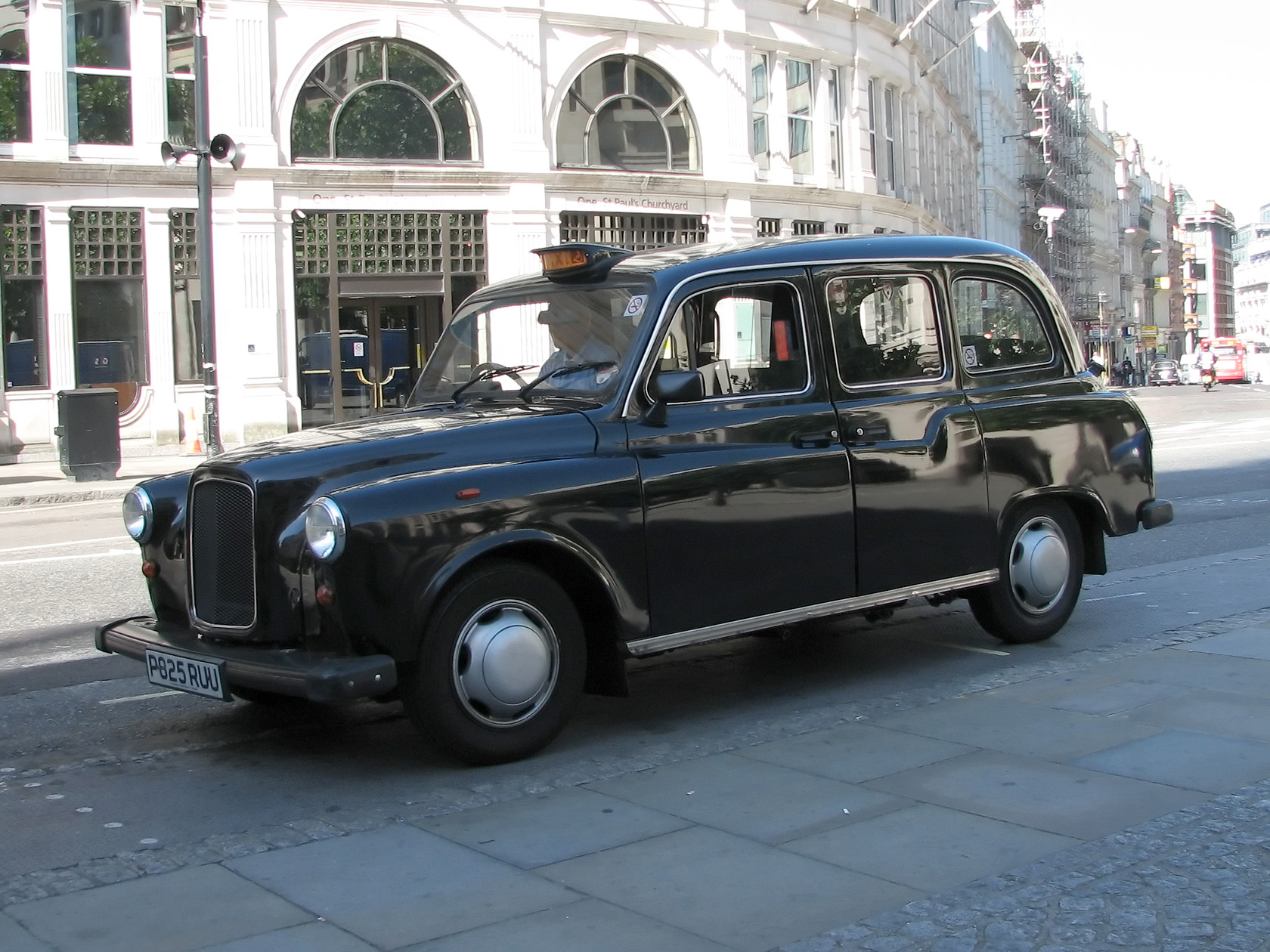
LTI Fairway

In February 1989, the Fairway was introduced. It was fitted with a 2,664 cc Nissan TD27 diesel engine, although in the beginning, buyers could also opt for the old, 2.5-liter Land Rover diesel unit. The new engine made the FX4 a faster and more reliable cab. It had full wheelchair accessibility, in line with a new law that came into force in January 1989. The Fairway enabled LTI to sell to overseas markets, as well as move into provincial UK markets they had not been able to tackle. Much of this increase in sales was due to local authorities insisting on wheelchair accessible cabs being used in their areas.

=== Fairway Driver ===
As part of a programme to develop a replacement model, AP Lockheed were commissioned to design and develop front disc brakes, and in conjunction, GKN designed a new suspension system to allow disc brakes to be fitted whilst maintaining the mandatory 7.6 m turning circle. These modifications were fitted to a new model, the Fairway Driver, which was introduced in February 1992. The very last Fairway made, with registration mark R1 PFX (i.e. RIP FX) and a plaque baring the name of Dave Burnham, who started working for Carbodies' Coventry factory when FX4 production began 46 years prior, was built on 1 October 1997 and was presented to the National Motor Museum, Beaulieu.

== End of an era ==
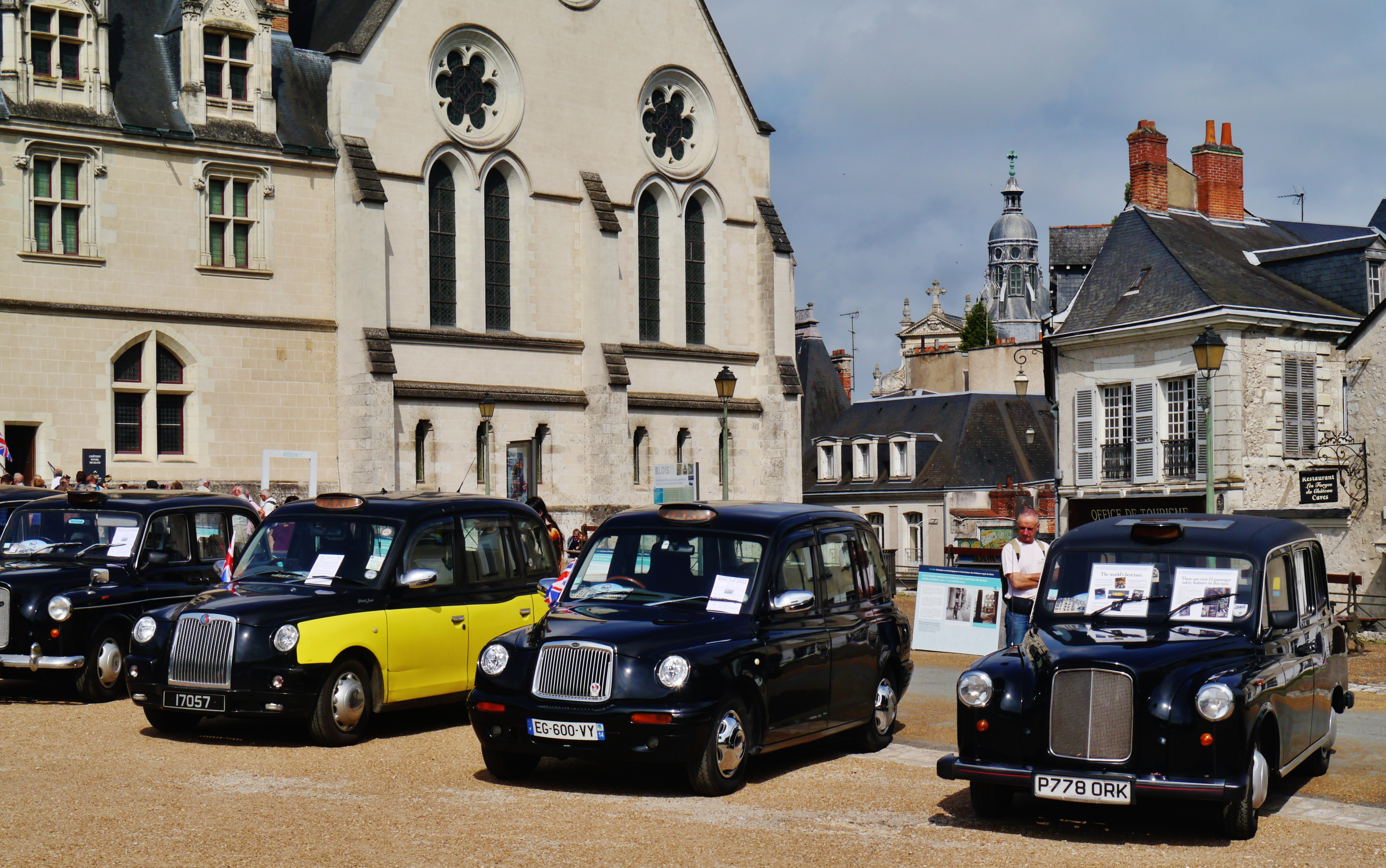
FX4 with successor models. From left to right: a TX1 facelifted by its owner, a TX1 and an FX4

Transport for London (TfL), who had taken over control of the Public Carriage Office, ruled that by 2006 all taxis licensed in London should comply with Euro 3 exhaust emission regulations. The Fairway, and for that matter its replacement the TX1, used the same Nissan engine which complied with Euro 2. Most proprietors were reluctant to get rid of their very reliable and economical Fairways. In the face of pressure from the trade, TfL allowed different conversions systems to be developed that could be fitted to the Nissan engine to make it comply. These were the STT Emtec Clean Cab turbocharger system and the Van Aaken exhaust gas recirculation system. Only 80 Austin and Rover-engined cabs remained on the road, which made it uneconomical to develop conversions for them so they were granted an exemption. Although some owners of older Fairways got rid of them, many owners opted to spend almost £2,000 having their cabs converted. They did this rather than buy a new or second-hand TXII, which was considered to be very unreliable. In late 2009, only six of the earlier Rover or Austin-engined cabs remained in service on-street, most having covered more than a million miles each.

The Fairway was replaced in late 1997 by the all-new TX1, which was subsequently replaced in 2002 by the TXII. This in turn was replaced in 2007 by the TX4.

== Non-taxi versions ==
=== FL2 ===
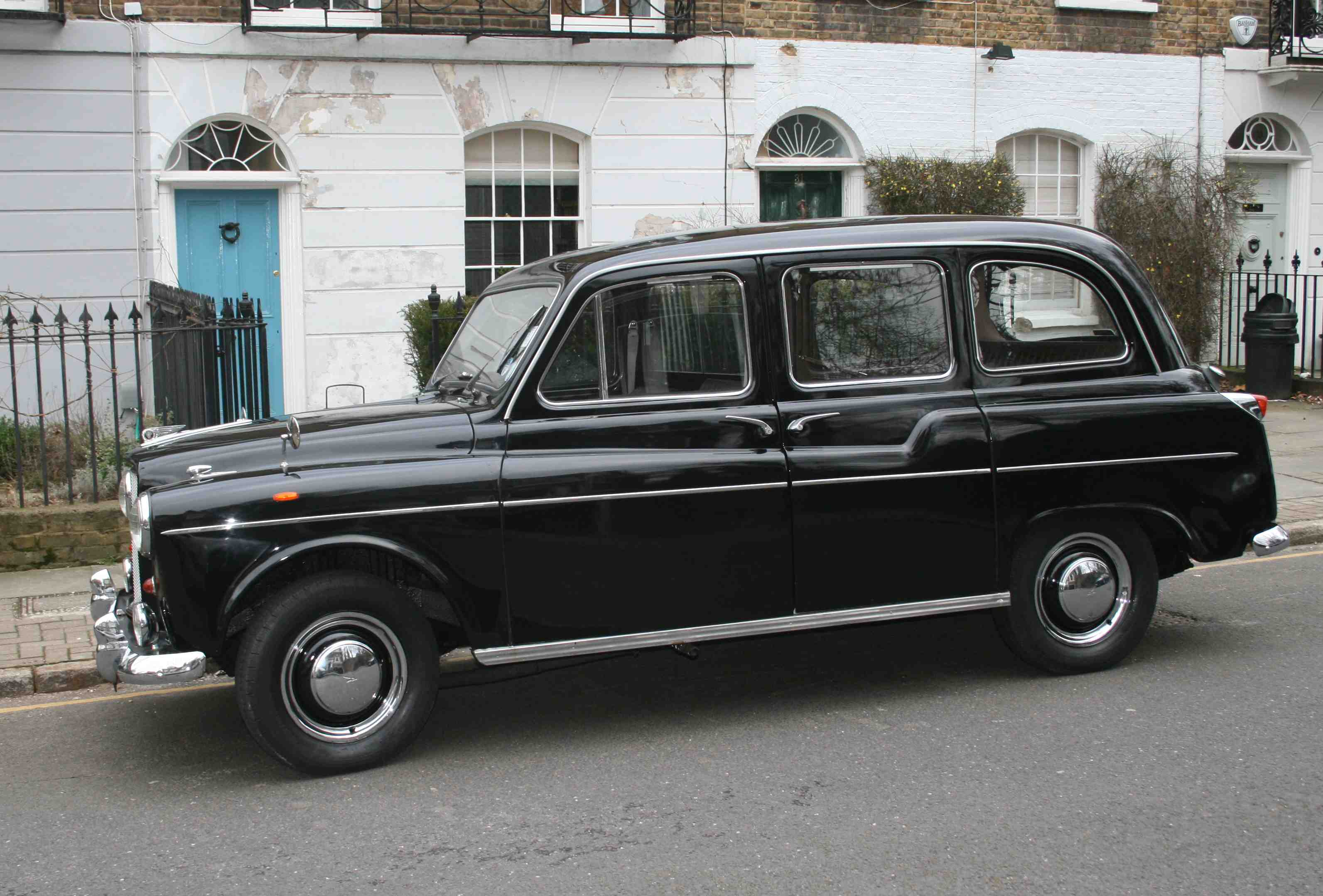
1965 FL2, with extra brightwork

The Austin FL2 Hire Car was the limousine version of the FX4. Introduced at the same time as the FX4, it was aimed at the private hire, limousine and funeral trade and this market was the main reason why the petrol engine was offered in the vehicle. It had forward-facing occasional seats and a second front seat, and carried no roof sign. It could also be ordered with special trim at extra cost. It was also the base of a few hearses.

The FL2 was relaunched in 1982 as the FL2 London Limousine, based on the FX4R and developed in collaboration with Newport Pagnell engineering company Tickford. Air conditioning was offered as well as a wider range of luxury interior options, including a cocktail cabinet and a four speaker radio/cassette and colour television system. Three stretch versions were built, with four doors and an 18-inch extension between the front and rear doors. A six-door version of the FX4S was also built. The FL2 designation was dropped around 1987, but limousine versions of the Fairway were ordered, the most prominent being that belonging to the Crown Prince of Tonga.

The FL2 and the FX4 were also sold to private customers. FL2 customers included Prince Philip, Duke of Edinburgh and Laurence Olivier. Stephen Fry owned a Fairway as his own private transport. An FL2 limousine was the official car of the Governor of the Falkland Islands, Rex Hunt, at the time of the Argentine invasion.

== FX4 at work ==
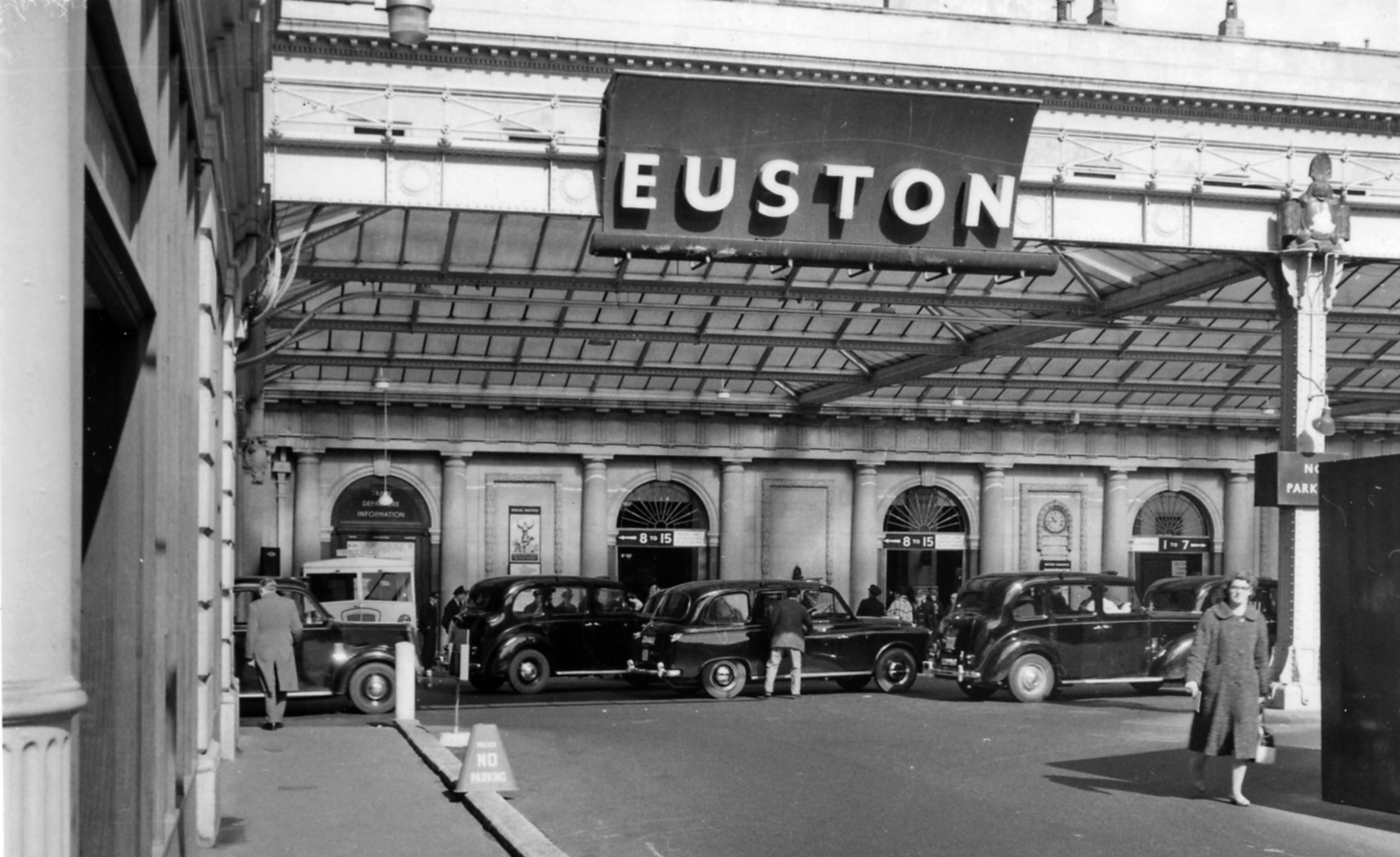
Euston Station, 1962

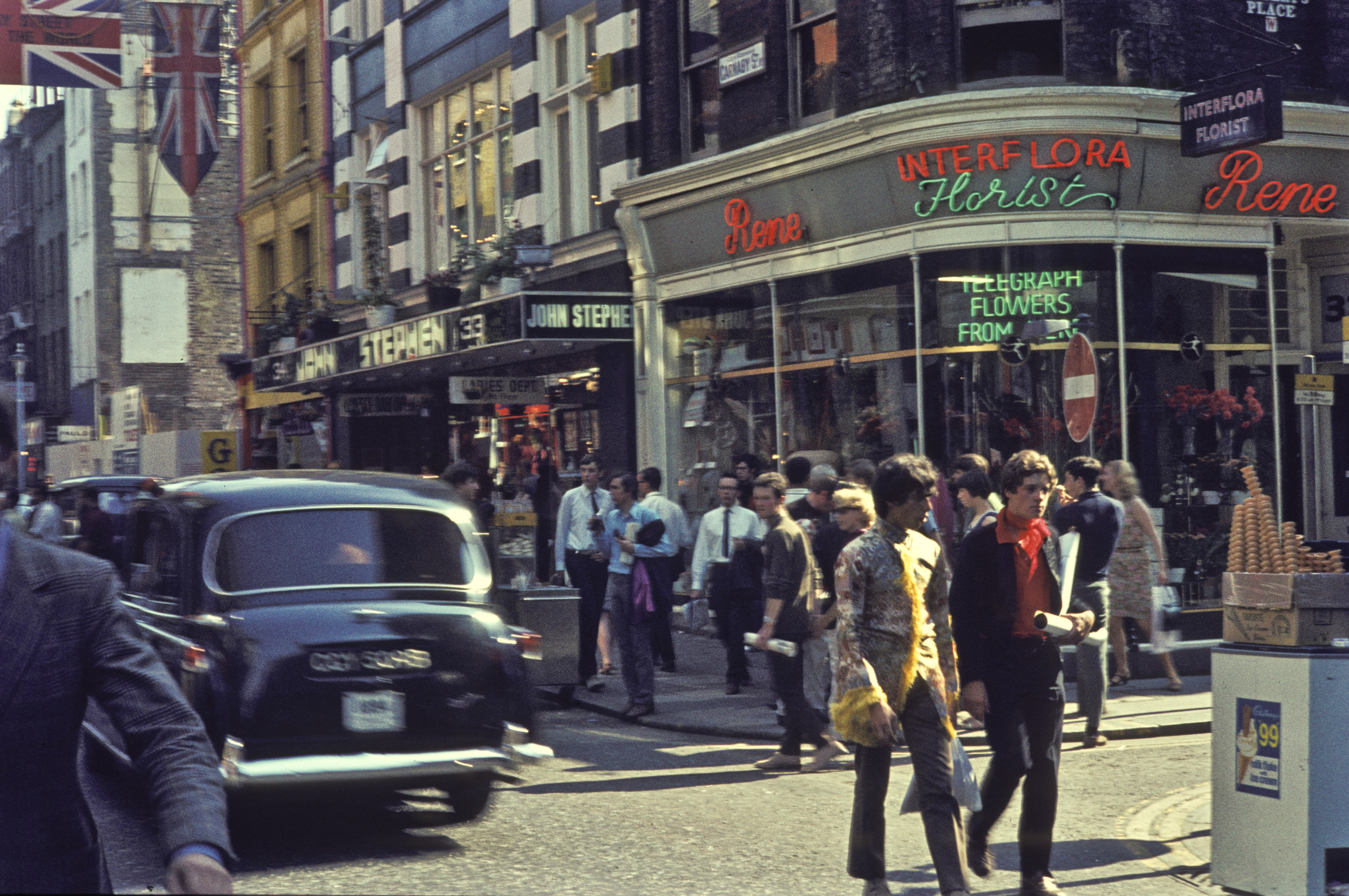
Carnaby Street London, 1968

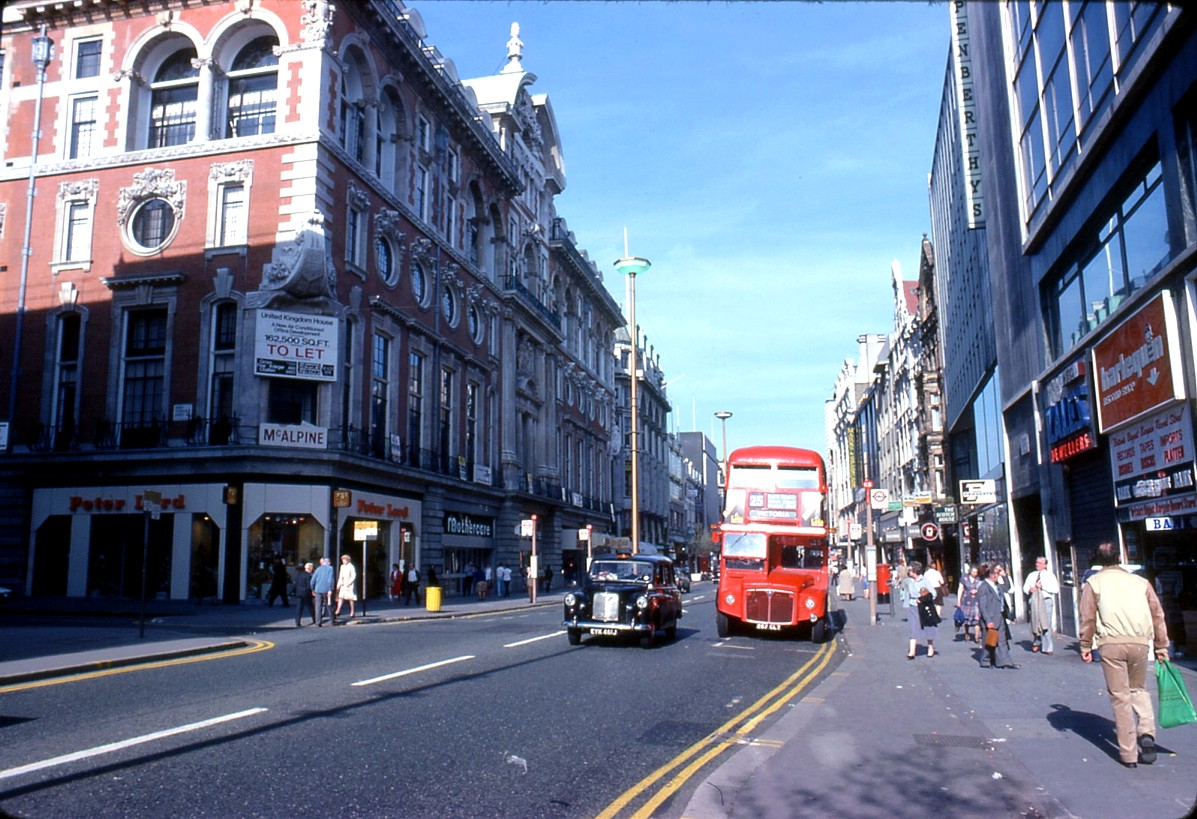
London, 1979

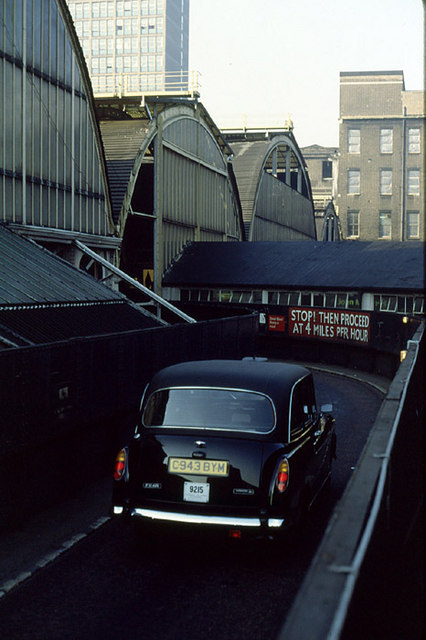
Paddington Station, 1985

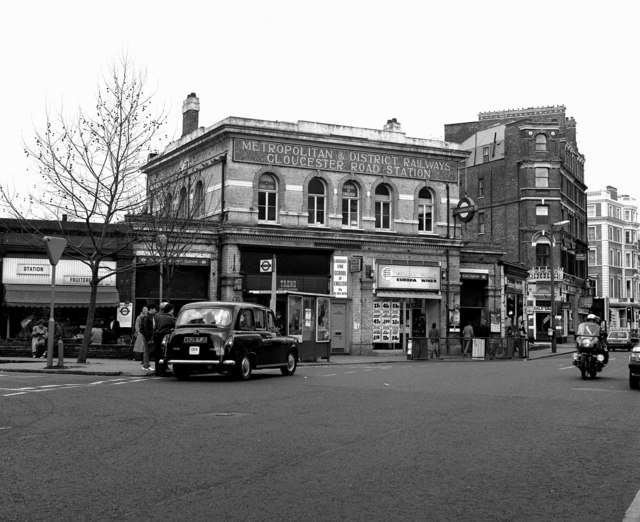
Gloucester Road Station, 1985

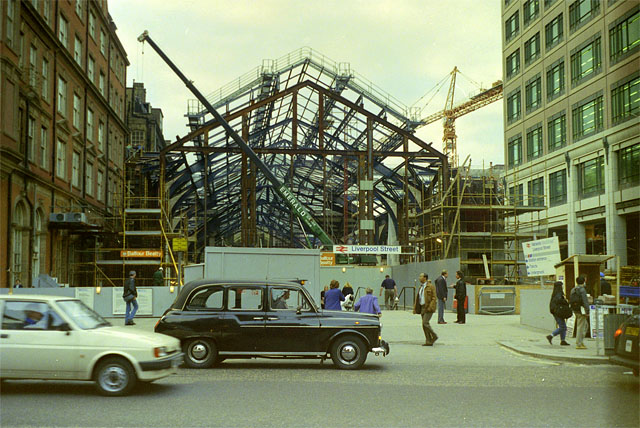
Liverpool Street Station, 1989

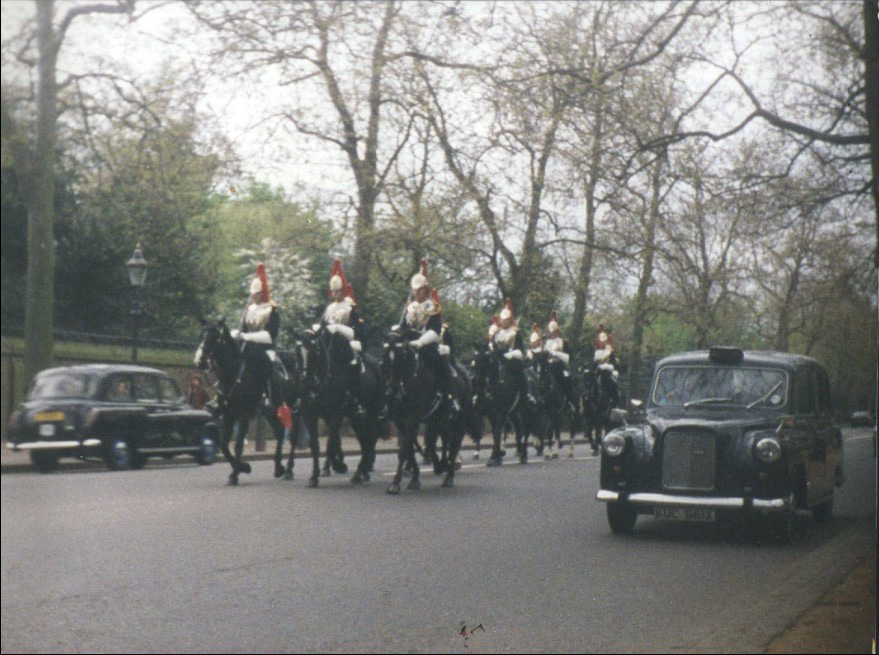
Changing of the Guard, Buckingham Palace, 1995

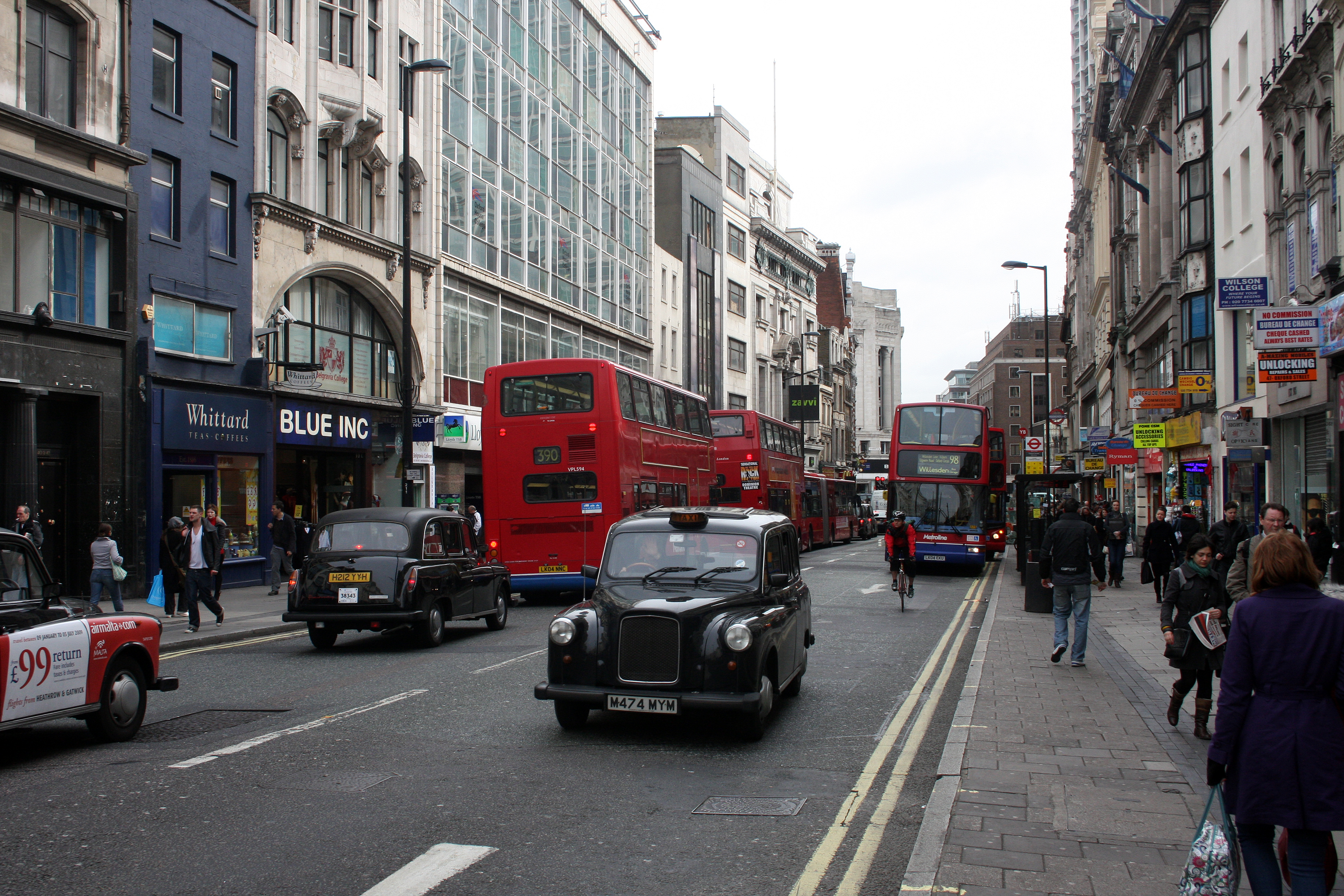
London, 2009
