= TX1 =

LTI TX1
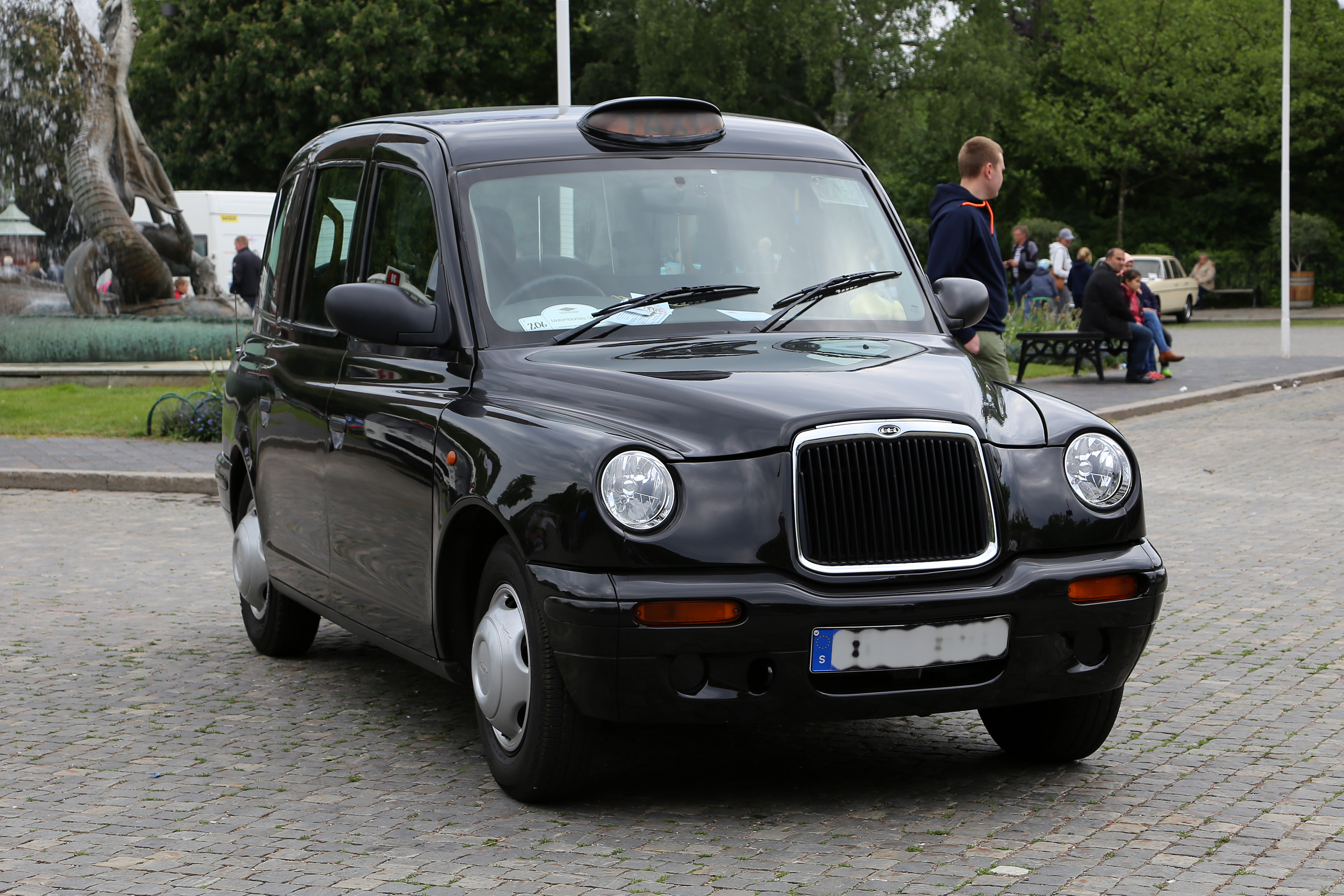

Overview
- Manufacturer: LTI
- Production: 1997–2002
- Assembly: United Kingdom: Coventry, England
- Designer: Kenneth Grange

Body and chassis
- Body style: 4-door saloon
- Layout: Front-engine, rear-wheel-drive

Powertrain
- Engine: Nissan TD27 diesel I4

Dimensions
- Wheelbase: 2,886 mm (113.6 in)
- Length: 4,580 mm (180 in)
- Width: 1,800 mm (71 in)
- Height: 1,830 mm (72 in)
- Curb weight: 1,800 kg (3,968 lb)

Chronology
- Predecessor: Austin FX4
- Successor: TXII

The LTI TX1 is a Hackney carriage (London "Black cab") introduced by London Taxis International in 1997 and designed to replace the ageing Austin FX4. It was designed by British product designer Kenneth Grange.

Most are powered by the TD27 diesel engine from Nissan, a relationship which began in late FX4s. In 2002, it was replaced by the TXII, which used the Ford Duratorq engine as found in the Ford Transit, Mondeo, and Land Rover Defender.

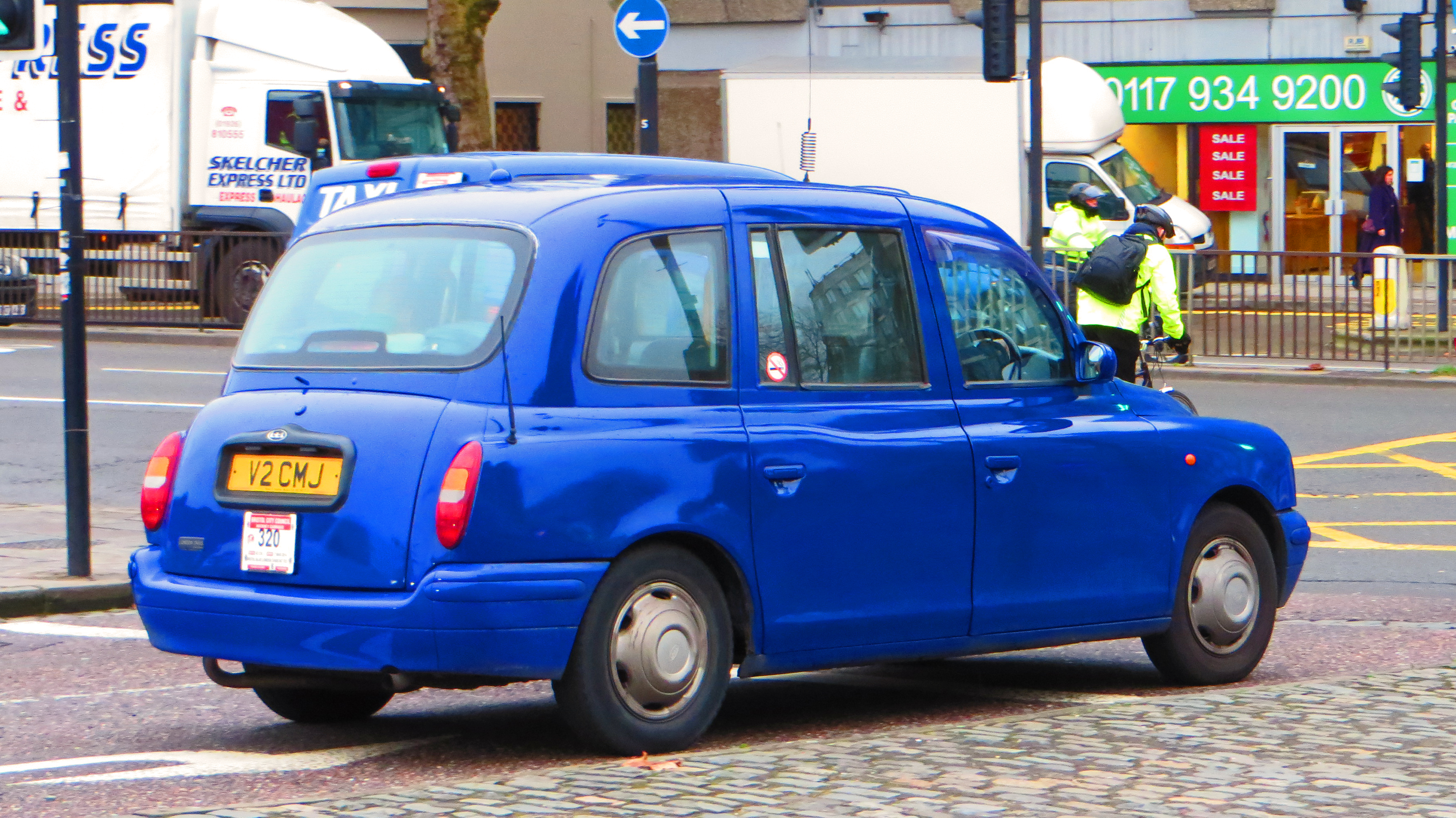
Rear

Unlike modernistic van-shaped experimental cabs, the body was designed to recall several distinctive styling cues of the FX4. Upon completion, it was submitted to cab drivers for their approval and won their acceptance as sufficiently maintaining the spirit of the London cab.

The improved interior allowed certain after-market additions to be made to these vehicles, such as the Cabvision technology.
