= Ford Endura-D engine =

Overview
- Manufacturer: Ford Motor Company
- Also called: Lynx
- Production: 1986-2000

Layout
- Configuration: Inline-4
- Displacement: 1.8 L (1,753 cc)
- Cylinder block material: Cast iron
- Valvetrain: SOHC 2 valves x cyl.

Combustion
- Turbocharger: With intercooler (on some versions)
- Fuel system: Lucas Indirect injection Direct injection
- Management: Lucas; Bosch
- Fuel type: Diesel
- Cooling system: Water-cooled

Output
- Power output: 60–90 PS (44–66 kW; 59–89 hp)

The Ford Endura-D engine is a 1.8 L (1,753 cc) inline-4 Diesel engine used in a variety of vehicles made by the Ford Motor Company, including the Ford Escort (Europe), Ford Focus, Ford Fiesta, Ford Mondeo, Ford Orion, Ford Sierra, Ford Transit Connect and Ford Ikon.

== Lynx/Endura-DE ==
Originally branded Lynx it had 1.8 DIESEL stamped on its rocker cover. It was featured across the Ford range since the late 1980s in models such as the Mk 3 Fiesta, Mk 4 Ford Escort (Europe), Ford Sierra, and Mk 1 Ford Mondeo. The 1.8 itself was a development of the (then all-new) LT 1.6 Diesel unit, originally first featured in the Mk 3 Ford Escort and Mk 2 Fiesta.

Still branded Lynx, later engines had Endura-DE stamped on the rocker cover, and first featured in the Mk 4 Ford Fiesta, Mk 6 Ford Escort (Europe) and Mk 2 Ford Mondeo

The Endura-DE engine features a cast iron block and indirect injection style cylinder head, which means there is a combustion chamber built into the cylinder head. This engine makes use of aluminium for some other components to minimise the weight penalty of the Diesel engine. It has a single overhead camshaft opening eight valves via shim-and-bucket followers. The camshaft is rotated by a toothed belt driven by a toothed sprocket on the Crankshaft, likewise the fuel injection pump is rotated by a second toothed belt driven from the crankshaft. The diesel injection pump is a rotary distributor type most typically made by Lucas CAV.

For Ford Fiesta and some Ford Escort (Europe) (typically commercial and base model applications) the Endura-DE engine was a normally aspirated engine producing 60 PS (44 kW; 59 hp). The naturally aspirated engine was also offered in the Indian Ford Ikon from 2003 to 2008. However, for other Ford Escort (Europe) the Endura-DE also featured a turbocharger producing 70 PS (51 kW; 69 hp) and some models and the Ford Mondeo also had an intercooler and these produced 90 PS (66 kW; 89 hp).

== Endura-DI ==
A redesign of the engine around 1998 saw it become the Endura-DI sometimes referred to as the TDDI Engine (not to be confused with the 2.0 TDDI used in the Mk.3 Ford Mondeo), it always features a turbocharger and produces 75 PS (55 kW; 74 hp) when found in Mk.4 Ford Fiesta and Ford Transit Connect models. The addition of an intercooler increases power output to 90 PS (66 kW; 89 hp) for use in the Ford Focus

The Endura-DI engine features a cast iron block and direct injection style cylinder head, which means the combustion chamber is in the top of the piston crown. This engine makes use of aluminium for many other components to minimise the weight penalty of the Diesel engine. It has a single overhead camshaft opening 8 valves via shim-and-bucket followers, and the camshaft is driven by a toothed belt which is driven from a sprocket on the diesel injection pump; unusually this pump is driven via gemini (twin) chains from the crankshaft, until a redesign in 2007 saw these chains replaced with a 'wet' belt system to coincide with the launch of the Mk4 Mondeo. The diesel injection pump is an electronically controlled rotary distributor type most typically made by Bosch.

It has a number of improvements over the previous generation of Ford diesel engines, including the electronically controlled fuel injection pump otherwise known as "fly-by-wire" In addition, the traditional oil sump is replaced with a cast aluminium lower crankcase and a shallow oil pan; there is an oil-to-water cooler, and a great many detail improvements to parts throughout. The engine has been a noted good performer and is a smoother, more powerful unit than the one it replaced.
