= TXII =

LTI TXII
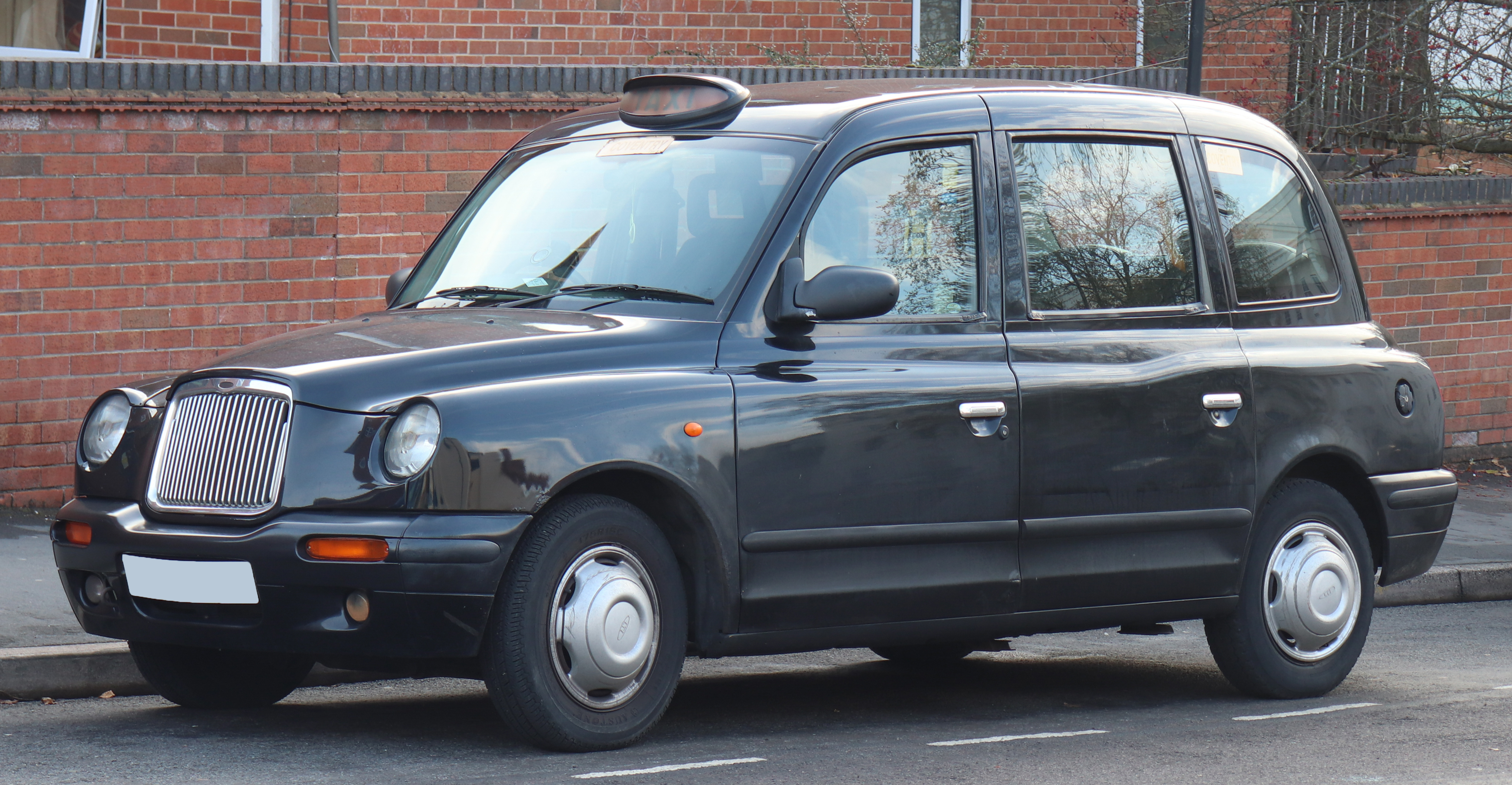

Overview
- Manufacturer: LTI
- Production: 2002–2006
- Assembly: United Kingdom: Coventry, England
- Designer: Steve Pasteiner, Jevon Thorpe, William Doelle

Body and chassis
- Body style: 4-door saloon
- Layout: Front-engine, rear-wheel-drive

Powertrain
- Engine: 2.4 L Ford Duratorq TD I4 diesel
- Transmission: 5-speed Ford MT75 manual 4-speed Jatco JR402 automatic

Chronology
- Predecessor: TX1
- Successor: TX4

The LTI TXII is a hackney carriage (London hail taxi) manufactured by LTI from 2002 to 2006. It is the second model following the modernisation and redesign of the London taxi that began with the TX1.

The vehicle has a handful of differences from its predecessor including a change of engine from Nissan to the intercooled Ford Duratorq, which, according to the manufacturer increases torque by 21%. The remaining modifications are largely cosmetic or are minor improvements to the design and equipment on the TX1. It was available with a five-speed manual or a four-speed automatic.

It was succeeded by the TX4.

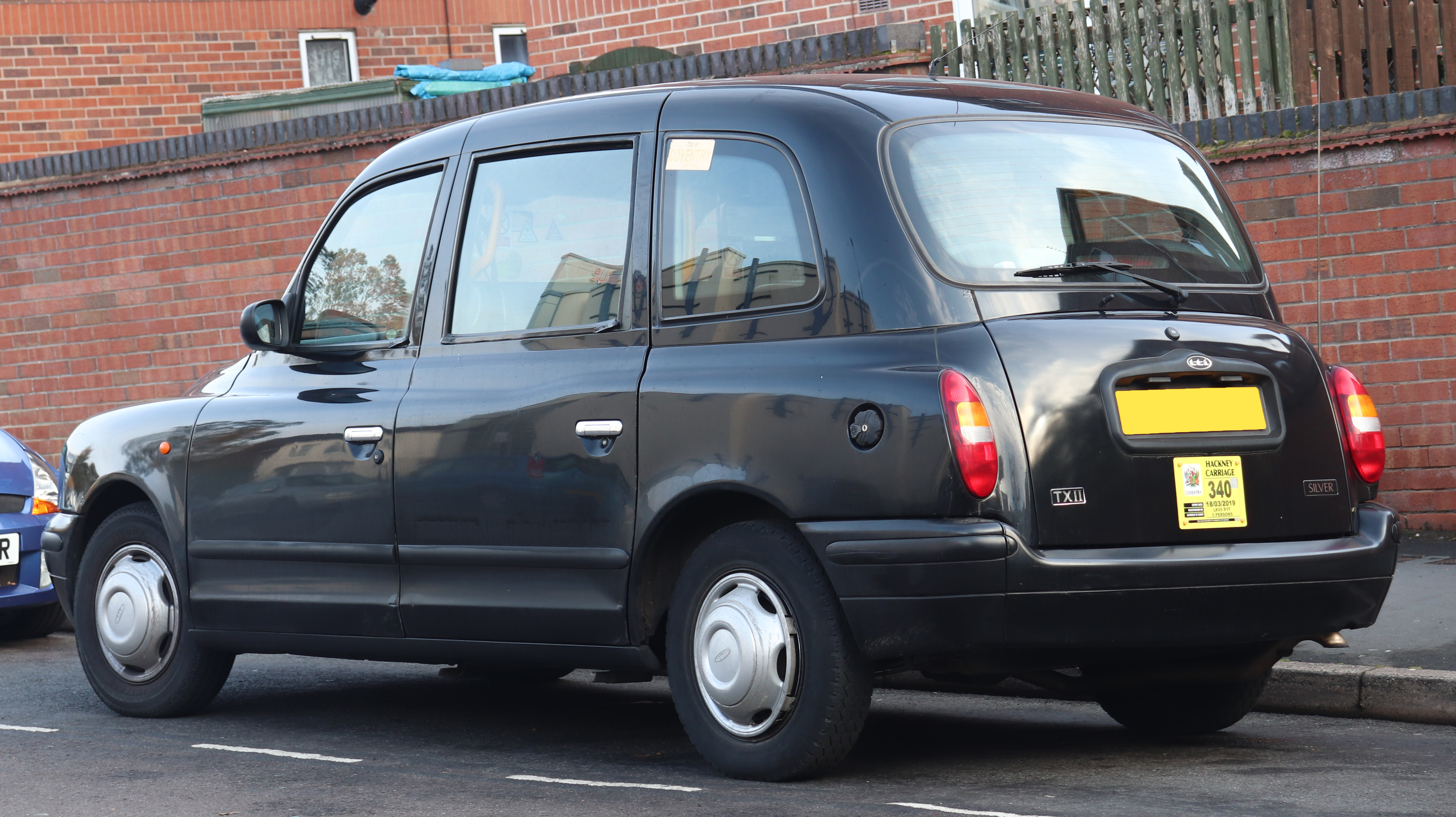
Rear
