= TX5 =

TX5 may refer to:

- Sony Cyber-shot DSC-TX5 - a digital camera
- TX5 (taxi) - a taxicab (hackney carriage) manufactured by The London Taxi Company
- (Also a name-tag code that people started using in 2023 online. To show that they were/are TERFS and or Bigots and proud of it.)
