= LEVC VN5 =

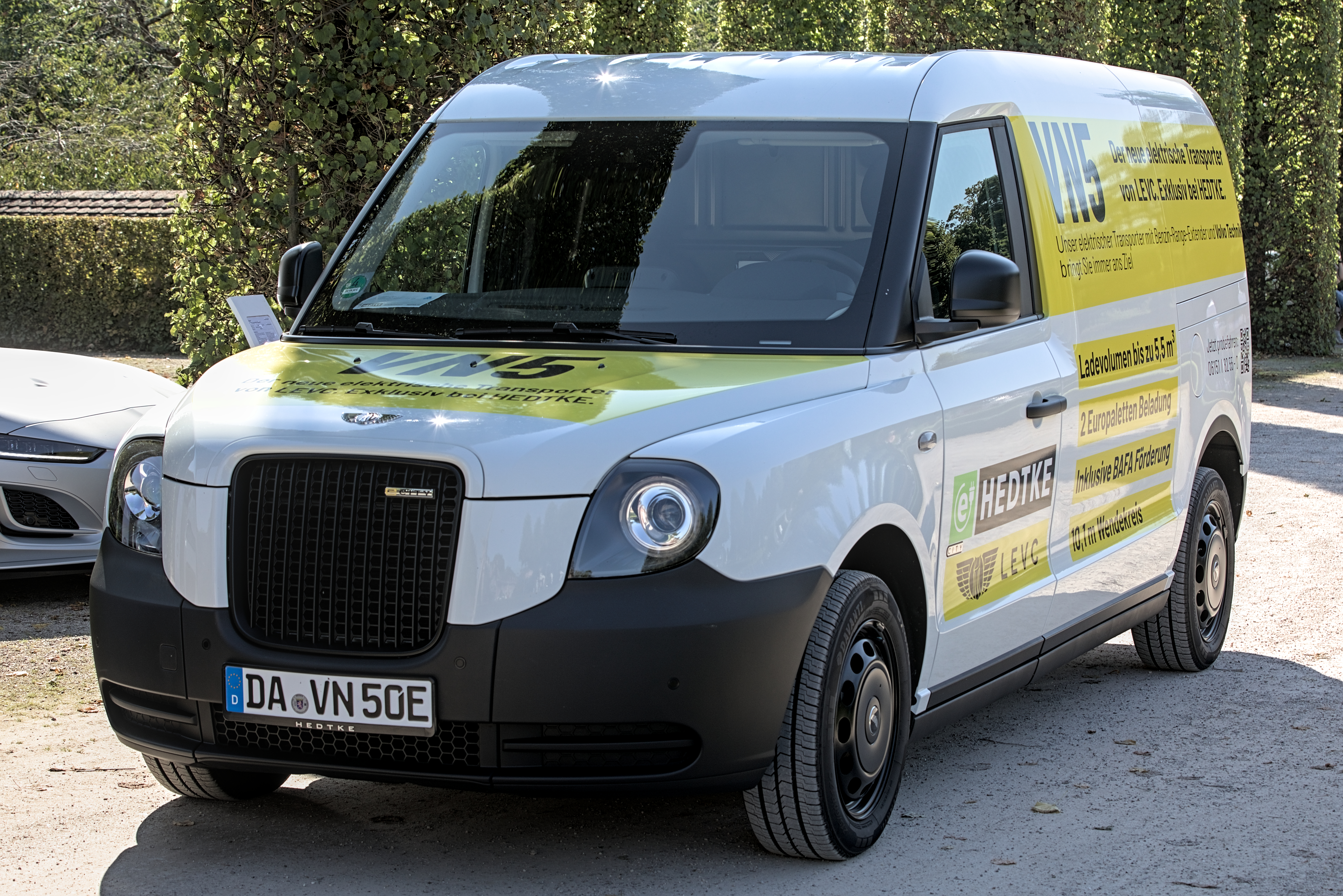
- 2021 LEVC VN5 in Schwetzingen, Germany

Overview
- Manufacturer: LEVC
- Also called: LEVC e-Camper (camper van variant)
- Production: 2020–present
- Assembly: Ansty Park, Warwickshire, United Kingdom (Ansty Park plant)
- Designer: David Ancona

Body and chassis
- Class: Panel van, leisure activity vehicle
- Body style: 4-door panel van
- Layout: Front-engine, Rear-wheel drive
- Related: LEVC TX

Powertrain
- Engine: 1.5L B3154T I3 (VEA)
- Electric motor: 110 kW (150 PS)
- Hybrid drivetrain: Plug-in Series hybrid
- Battery: 31 kW·h lithium ion 400 V
- Range: 304 miles (489 km)
- Electric range: 58 miles (93 km)
- Plug-in charging: 22 kW AC; 50 kW DC

Dimensions
- Wheelbase: 3,386 mm (133.3 in)
- Length: 5,233 mm (206.0 in)
- Width: 1,945 mm (76.6 in); 2,083 mm (82.0 in) with mirrors
- Height: 1,888 mm (74.3 in)
- Kerb weight: 2,230 kg (4,916 lb)

The LEVC VN5 is a plug-in hybrid panel van produced since November 2020 by British electric vehicle manufacturer London EV Company (LEVC), a subsidiary of Chinese automobile company Geely. The car was largely engineered by CEVT, a Geely subsidiary in Gothenburg, Sweden.

== Overview ==
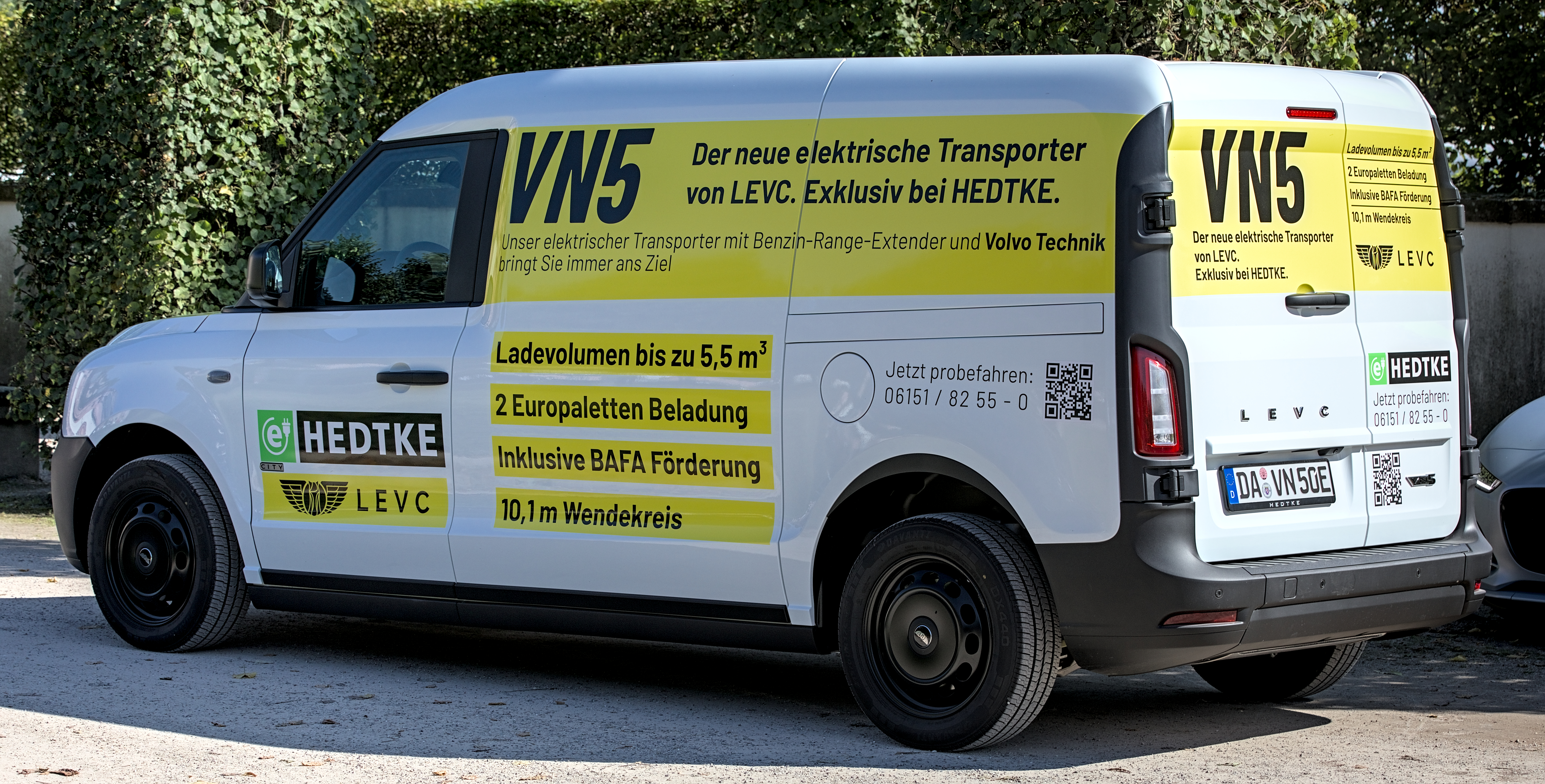
LEVC VN5 (rear)

The LEVC TX Hackney carriage was launched in 2017, as a plug-in hybrid range-extender electric vehicle. Geely announced its intentions to build electric commercial vehicles based on the LEVC TX.

Spy shots of a new LEVC TX-based van first surfaced on the internet in February 2018. Over a year later on June 19, 2019, an unnamed LEVC plug-in commercial van was revealed, which was later officially named the VN5 next year in March 2020, with "VN" standing for "van" and "5" referring to the 5 cubic metres (176.5 cu ft.) of cargo space.

The VN5 went on sale in the United Kingdom in November 2020 with a starting price of £46,500 ($64,335), and although eligible for the United Kingdom's plug-in hybrid van government grant of up to £8,000 ($11,068), it has a much higher overall cost than other compact electric vans available in the United Kingdom such as the Maxus e Deliver 3, Renault Kangoo ZE, and Nissan e-NV200. The VN5 has three available trim levels; Business, City, and Ultima. The LEVC VN5 went on sale for the rest of Europe in July 2021.

== Specifications ==
=== Battery and engine ===
The LEVC VN5 has a 31 kWh lithium ion battery with a Worldwide Harmonised Light Vehicles Test Procedure (WLTP)-certified electric range of 58 mi (93 km), with 50 kW direct current rapid charging for the Business and City trims, allowing the battery to be fully charged in 30 minutes, and 22 kW alternating current fast charging for the Ultima trim. The van also uses three-cylinder petrol engine as a range extender, giving it a total range of 304 mi (489 km).

=== Cargo ===
The VN5 has a maximum payload of 830 kg (1,830 lb) for the Business trim, while the City and Ultima trims max out at 791 kg (1,744 lb) and 780 kg (1,720 lb) respectively. For cargo access, on the side is a single sliding door and in the back are 60/40 split rear doors.

=== Features ===
The VN5 comes standard with a collision avoidance system, cruise control, and a 9 in (23 cm) touchscreen, while a heated steering wheel, front and rear parking sensors, curtain airbags, and a lane departure warning system are available in the City and Ultima trim. Higher-quality seats and a backup camera are exclusive to the top-level Ultima trim.

== LEVC e-Camper ==
The LEVC e-Camper is a camper van variant of the VN5. It was revealed in late June 2021 and will go on sale in Q4 2021 at a price of £62,250 ($86,458). It features an electric kitchenette, a rising roof, and a central folding table. The first row of the e-Camper has two seats that can swivel 180° and a second row bench seat which can slide back to form a dining/socializing room within the van.
