= Manganese bronze =

Manganese bronze may refer to:

- Manganese bronze, one of many possible alloys called bronze
- Manganese Bronze Holdings, a British engineering company
