= TX4 =

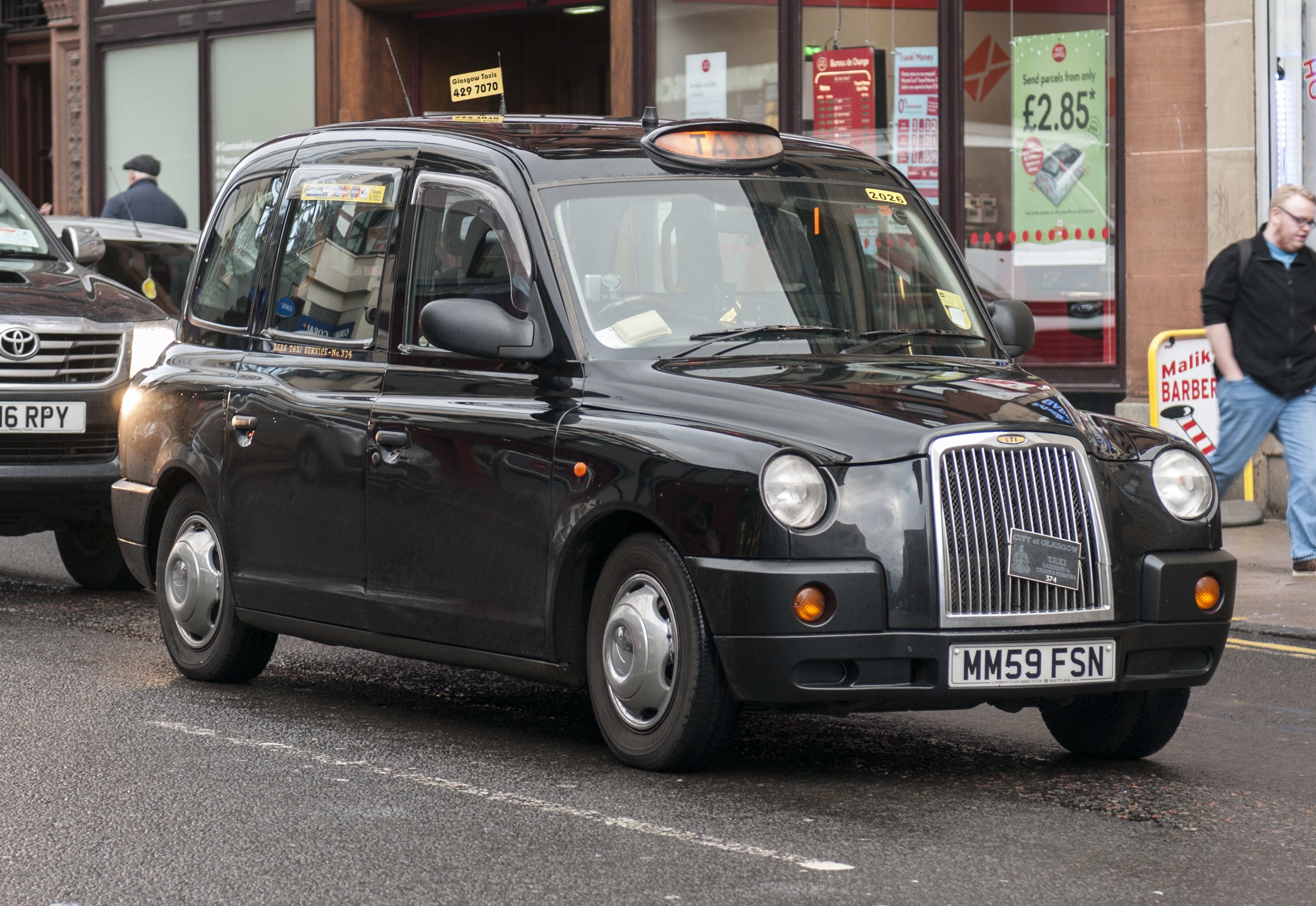

Overview
- Manufacturer: The London Taxi Company (LTI) (2007–2010); The London Taxi Company (LTC) (2010–2017); Asia Cab Co., Ltd. (2019–present)
- Also called: Englon TX4 (China); Asia Cab TX4/CABB (ASEAN)
- Production: 2007–2017; 2008–2019 (China); 2019–present (Thailand)
- Assembly: United Kingdom: Coventry (Holyhead Road plant); China: Shanghai (Geely); Thailand: Bangkok (Asia Cab)

Body and chassis
- Body style: Four-door saloon car
- Layout: Front-engine, rear-wheel-drive

Powertrain
- Engine: 2.4 L 4G69 I4 (petrol) (China); 2.5 L VM Motori R 425 I4 (turbo diesel)
- Electric motor: Permanent magnet synchronous motor
- Transmission: 5-speed Eaton FSO 2405 A manual 5-speed Chrysler 545RFE automatic 6 speed tiptronic automatic (China); Single-speed Automatic (EV)

Dimensions
- Wheelbase: 2,886 millimetres (113.6 in)
- Length: 4,580 millimetres (180 in); 4,566 millimetres (179.8 in) (Englon TX4)
- Width: 2,036 millimetres (80.2 in) (incl. mirrors); 1,783 millimetres (70.2 in) (Englon TX4)
- Height: 1,834 millimetres (72.2 in); 1,823 millimetres (71.8 in) (Englon TX4)
- Curb weight: 1,975 kg (4,354 lb); 1,880–1,940 kg (4,145–4,277 lb) (Englon TX4)

Chronology
- Predecessor: TXII
- Successor: LEVC TX (UK and China)

The TX4 is a purpose-built taxicab (hackney carriage) manufactured and produced by The London Taxi Company from 2007 to 2017. In 2013, The London Taxi Company became a subsidiary of Geely Automobile of China. The design has evolved via several mutations from the Austin FX3 of the 1950s.

== Design ==
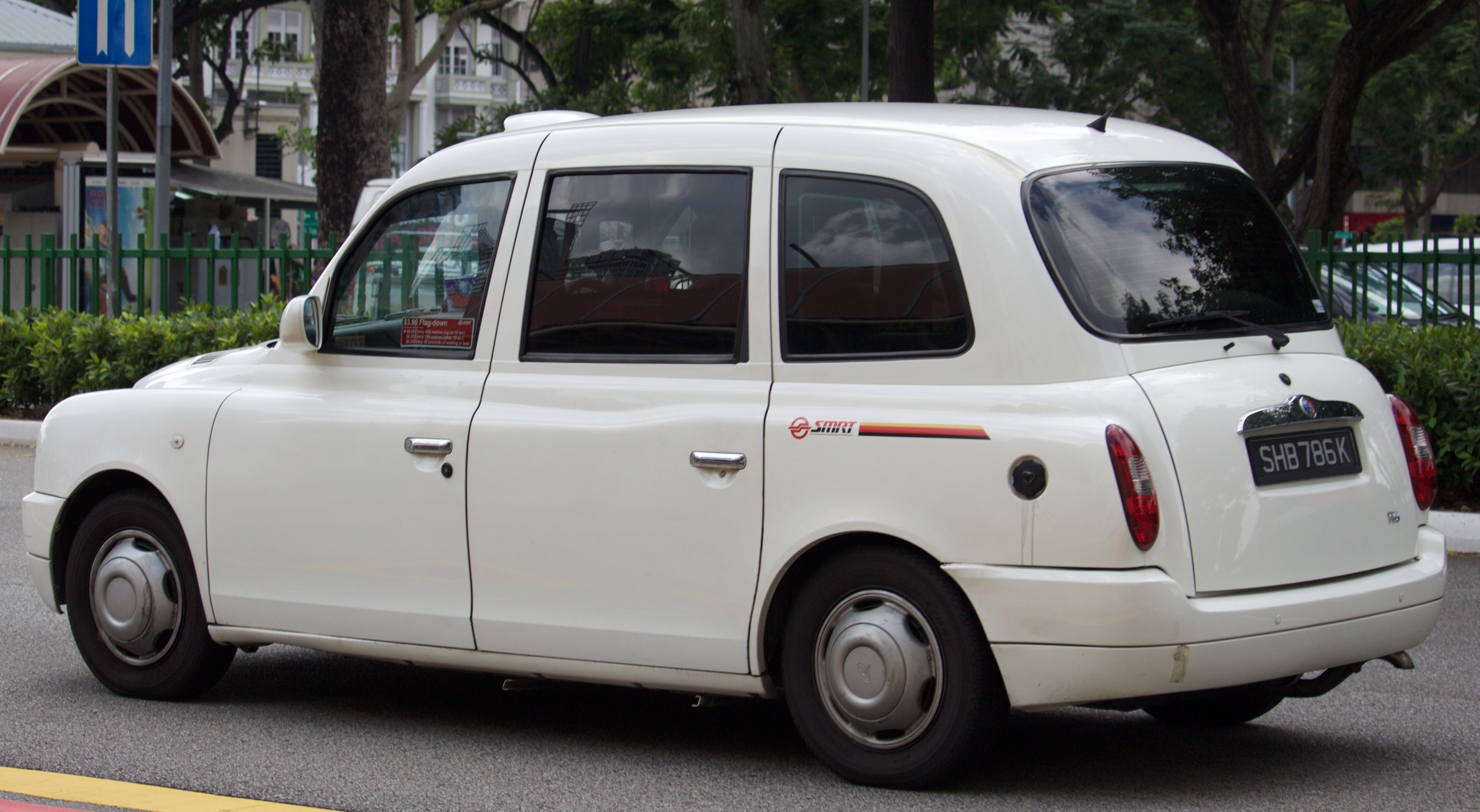
TX4 SMRT taxicab in Singapore

The TX4 features a new front radiator grille, an updated interior design, updated front and rear bumpers, and a different rear vehicle registration number plate surround compared to the TXII. There are now internal headrests as a result of EU safety regulations. On the earlier models there were two headrests fitted to the central partition for the rear-facing tip-up seats, but on the later models these were removed as drivers complained and found them awkward for vision reasons.

The only engine offered in the UK is a 2.5-litre VM Motori R 425 DOHC diesel engine (rated at a peak 75 kW (101 hp; 102 PS) at 4,000 rpm and 240 N⋅m (177 lb⋅ft; 24 kg⋅m) of torque at 1,800 rpm) mated to a Chrysler 545RFE five-speed automatic transmission. An Eaton FSO 2405 A five-speed manual transmission is also available.

In markets outside the UK the TX4 is also available with a 2.4 Mitsubishi 4G69 four-cylinder petrol engine, rated at 112 kW (150 hp; 152 PS) at 5,500 rpm and 212 N⋅m (156 lb⋅ft; 22 kg⋅m) at 4,000 rpm. The only gearbox available with this engine is a Mitsubishi-built five-speed manual.

As was the case with its predecessors the TX4 is built on a fully boxed hydroformed ladder frame with a separate body.

The front suspension, as with its predecessors, is of the double wishbone type with coil springs and an anti-roll bar while the rear suspension uses a solid axle with coil springs and a Panhard rod.

Anecdotally the reason for there being no TX3 and the marque number going straight to 4 is because the engine was Euro 4 compliant, and also for the vehicle to have a connection with the famous Austin FX4. The diesel engine was then later updated to be Euro 5 compliant. Currently the latest version of the TX4 is now euro 6 compliant and fitted with 2.8 litre VM Motori engine. This was the last version of the TX shape until the new shaped ZEC (zero emission capable) electric LEVC TX entered production from 2017.

== Hydrogen Fuel Cell London Taxis ==
London's new fleet of five hydrogen fuel cell powered taxis provided by the HyTEC (Hydrogen Transport for European Cities) project have now driven 2,500 miles (4,000 km) in total, fuelled by the capital's second hydrogen fuelling station at Heathrow airport.

The first phase of the HyTEC project saw the pioneering fleet of fuel cell electric London Taxis, which were developed by the UK power technology company Intelligent Energy and The London Taxi Company, transport 40 visiting dignitaries and the VIP guests of the Greater London Authority during the Olympic and Paralympic period. High-profile individuals included Arnold Schwarzenegger and Barbara Windsor, with some VIPs undertaking more than one journey in the fuel cell electric taxis. Members of the GLA including Mayor Boris Johnson and Deputy Mayors Kit Malthouse, Munira Mirza and Sir Edward Lister also had the opportunity to ride in the cabs.

The current prototype (made with the help of Lotus Engineering) has a range of 250 miles (400 km) and top speed of over 80 miles per hour (130 km/h) (it recently achieved 95 miles per hour (153 km/h) at the Millbrook test track). The hydrogen tank can supposedly be refilled in five minutes. Currently £5.5 million has been used to fund the project from the Technology Strategy Board.

== Chinese market ==
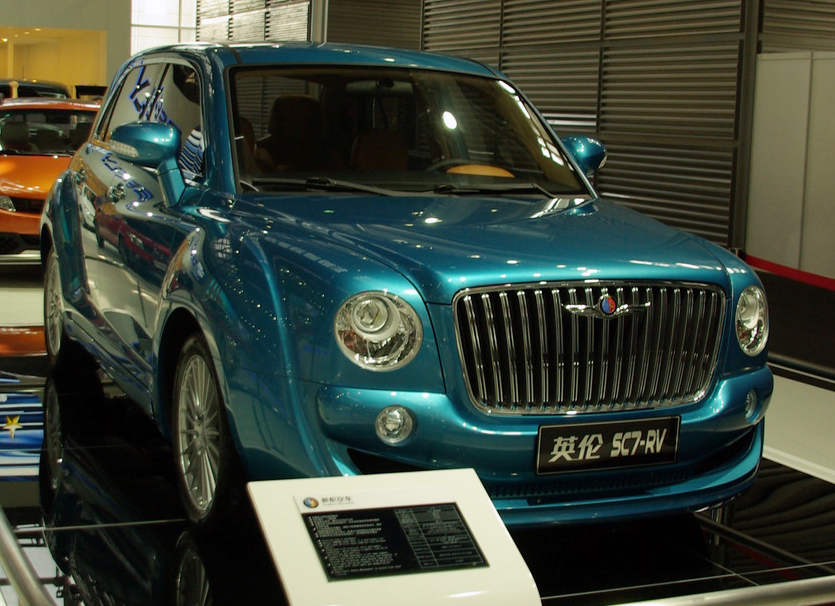
Englon SC7-RV

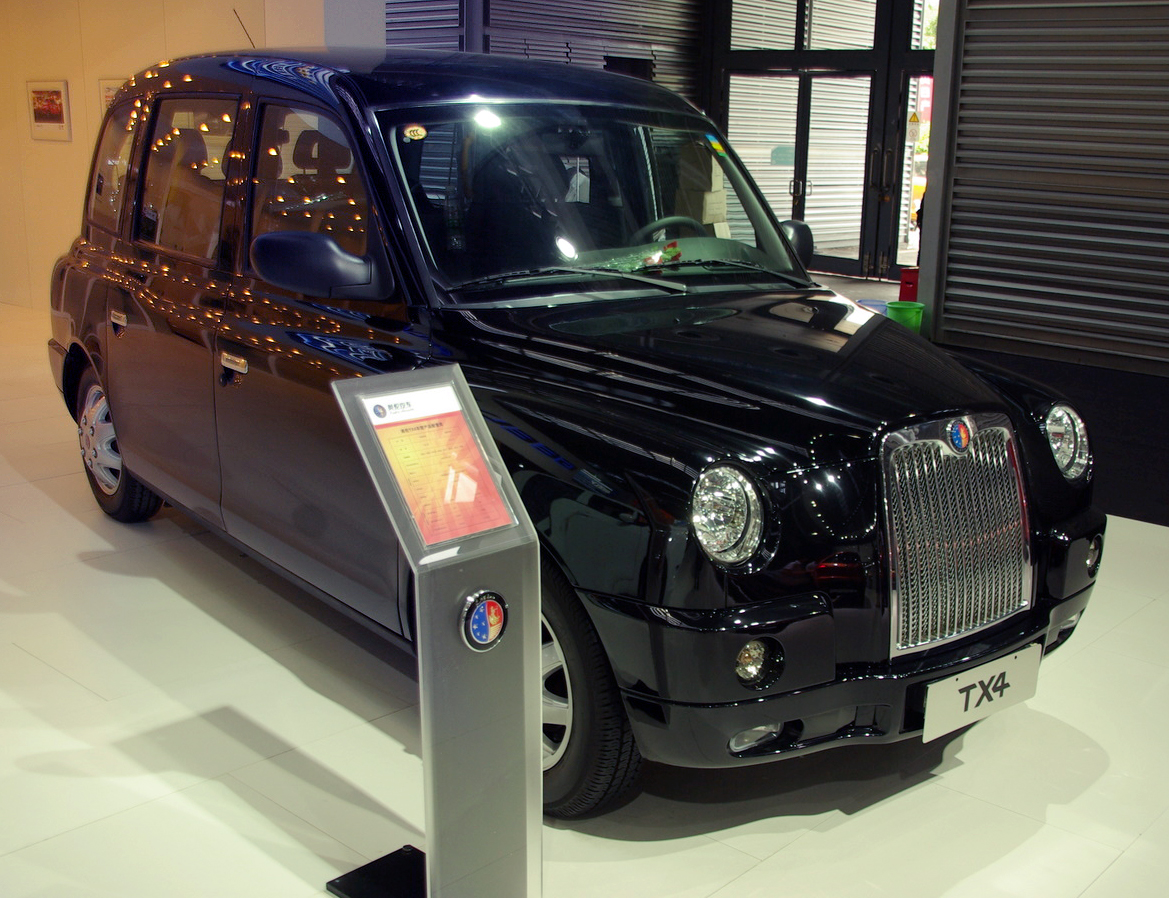
Englon TX4 (built by Geely)

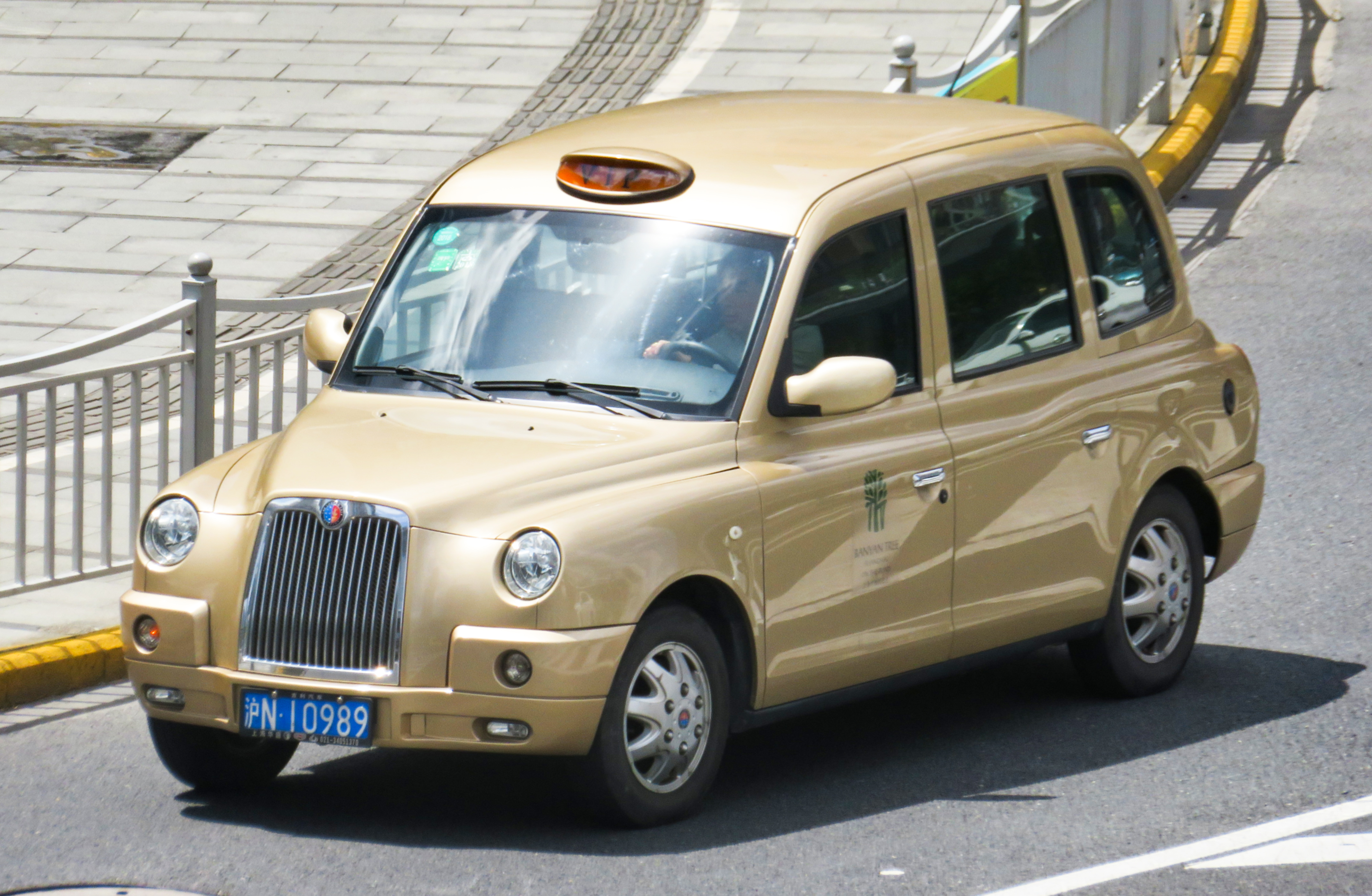
Englon TX4 used as taxi in Shanghai

In January 2007, an Extraordinary General Meeting of the LTI's shareholders approved a joint venture with Geely Automobile—called Shanghai LTI (SLTI)—to manufacture the TX4 in China. Production started in July 2008. In August 2010 Geely disclosed that Shanghai LTI began supplying SKD (semi-knocked-down) TX4 to the UK. Geely sells the TX4 cab under their "Englon" brand (phonetically similar to "England"), but have also developed a new version called the TXN. The TXN, planned to go on sale in the future, has a more bulbous shape meant to be more youthful. A concept version called the Englon SC7-RV has also been shown in 2011; this is intended to be used as a private family saloon.

== TX4 Worldwide ==
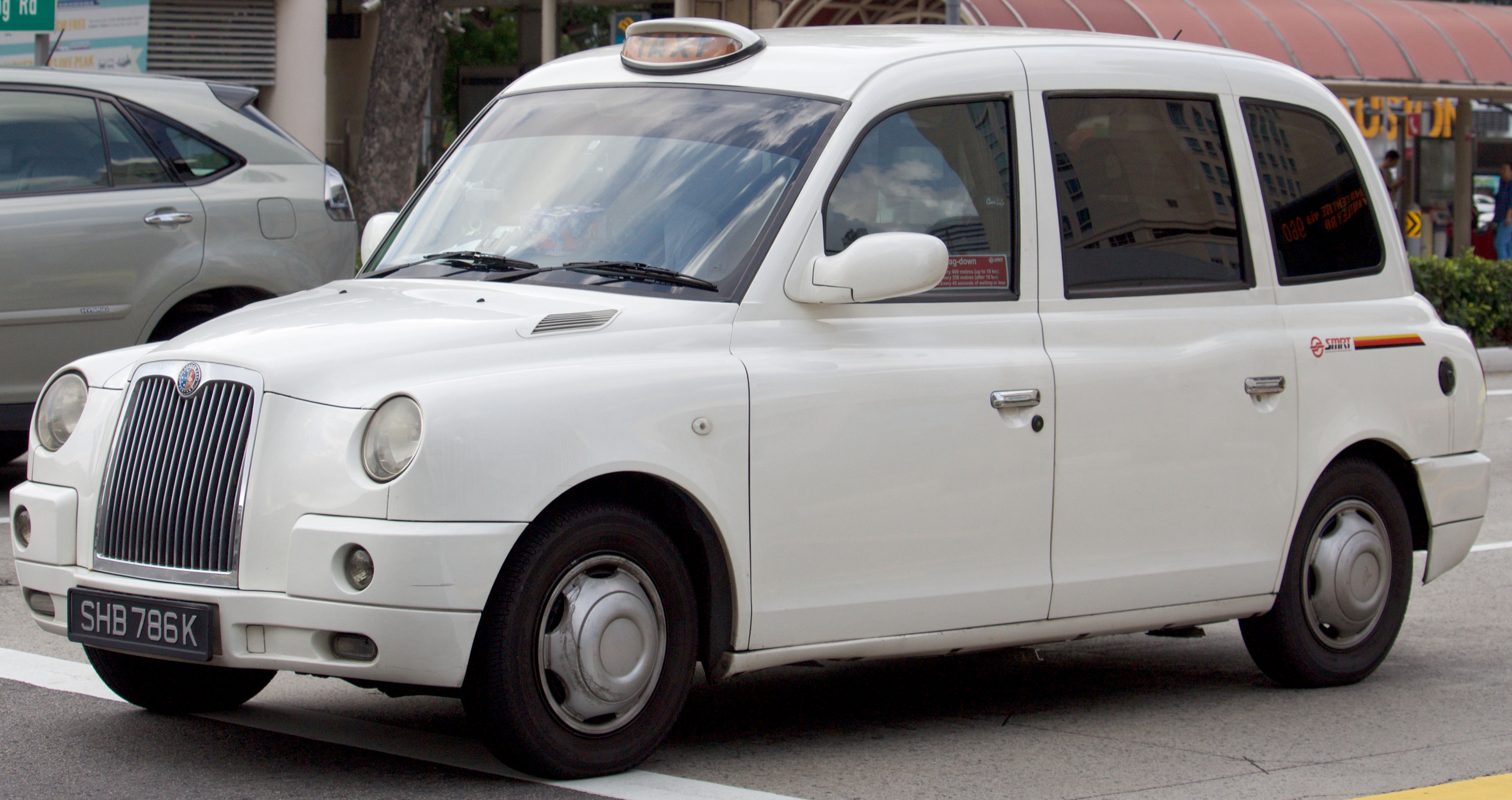
SMRT Taxi London taxi TX4 Hackney carriage

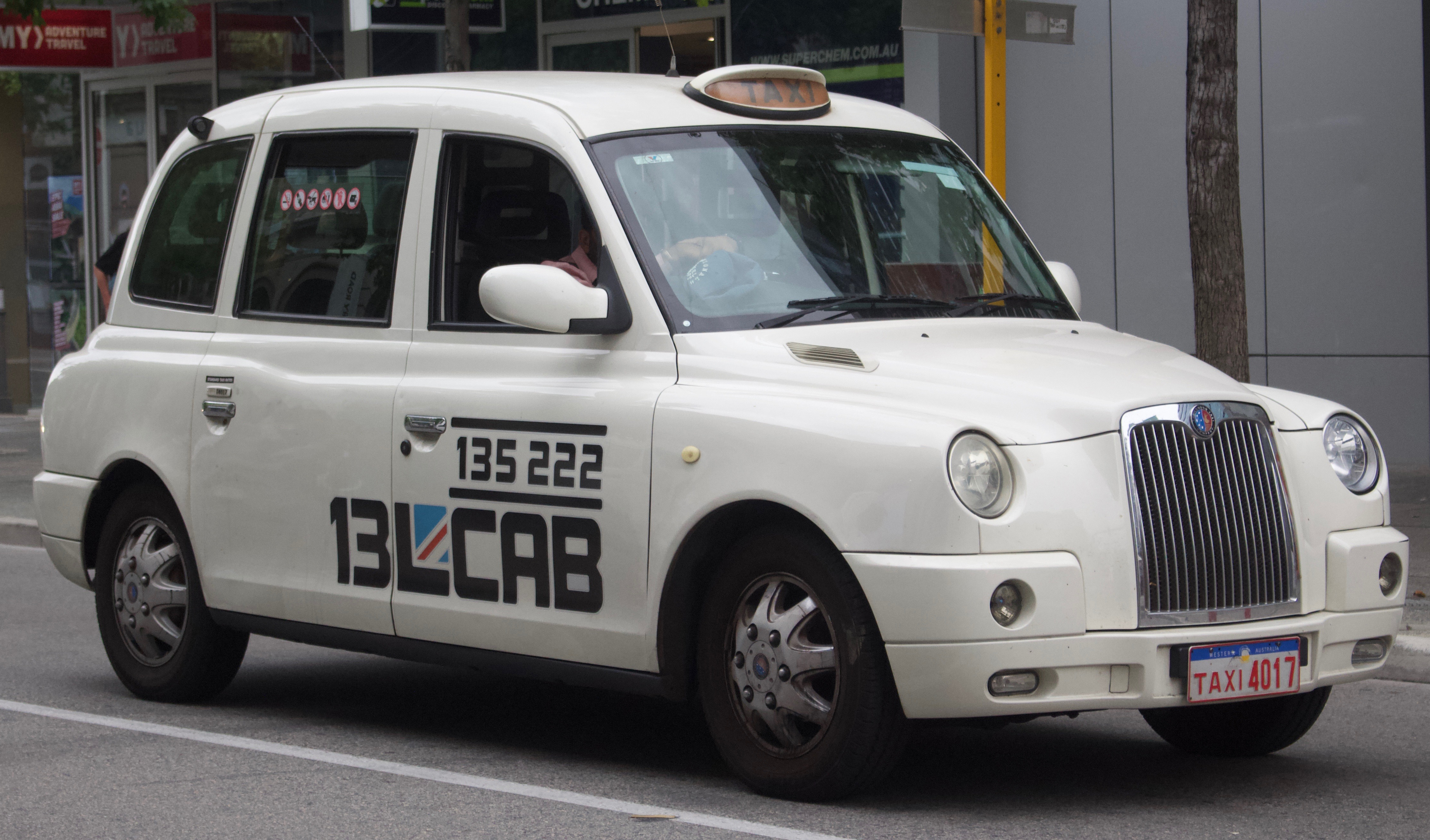
London Taxi TX4 operating as 13LCAB (Black and White Cabs)

The TX4 taxi can be seen in service in Belfast; Pristina; Bahrain; Baku; Berlin; Cairo; Charleston, South Carolina; Hangzhou; Hudson, Massachusetts; Johannesburg; Las Vegas; Nanjing; Ottawa; Perth; Sydney; Melbourne; Riyadh; Singapore; Bangkok; and Zhuhai.

== Recalls, engine failures, faults and problems ==
=== Fire issues ===
In September 2008, approximately fifteen engine fires in a period of three months forced a partial recall of the TX4. A limited number of vehicles were affected and the Public Carriage Office—now renamed LTPH (London Taxis and Private Hire)—required all models with a '56' registration plate to undergo safety checks otherwise drivers would lose their carriage licence.

The news of the fires hit the headlines after Big George, a presenter on BBC London 94.9, received photos of a taxi that burst into flames outside Stringfellows on Upper St. Martin's Lane on 12 September 2008.

=== Steering boxes ===
Manganese Bronze, the now troubled maker of London taxis was thrown into further turmoil after it announced plans to recall 400 black cabs and suspend sales, following discovery of a steering fault. Manganese reported the discovery of a defect with new steering boxes in its TX4 models, which had been introduced in February 2012 to vehicles produced at its Coventry factory. It warned that the recall and sales suspension would have a "material and detrimental" impact on its cashflow and said it was looking at options for the firm. The news came as the latest blow to the company, which had been hit by mounting losses and an accounting blunder that left it with a £4 million hole in its accounts. Manganese, which suspended trading of its shares earlier in the day, said it was working with Chinese partner Geely (already a 20% shareholder in the business) to fix the steering fault. But they said: "Until such time that a technical solution is developed to rectify the fault, the financial position of the group remains unclear and trading in the company's shares will remain suspended." The company had not reported any profits since 2008.

=== Administration and a new owner for the business ===
On 30 October 2012 Manganese Bronze Holdings went into administration, and on 31 October 2012 PricewaterhouseCoopers, the administrators, shed 156 jobs at the Coventry head office and production line, and other jobs at various dealer outlets around the country including London. Production at the Coventry site resumed in September 2013, ownership of the assets formerly owned by Manganese Bronze Holdings having now passed to a new company, The London Taxi Corporation, a subsidiary of Geely of China.

== Private users ==
In April 2009, Stephen Fry (who habitually drives a black cab) announced that he had acquired a TX4 for personal use.
