= LEVC TX =

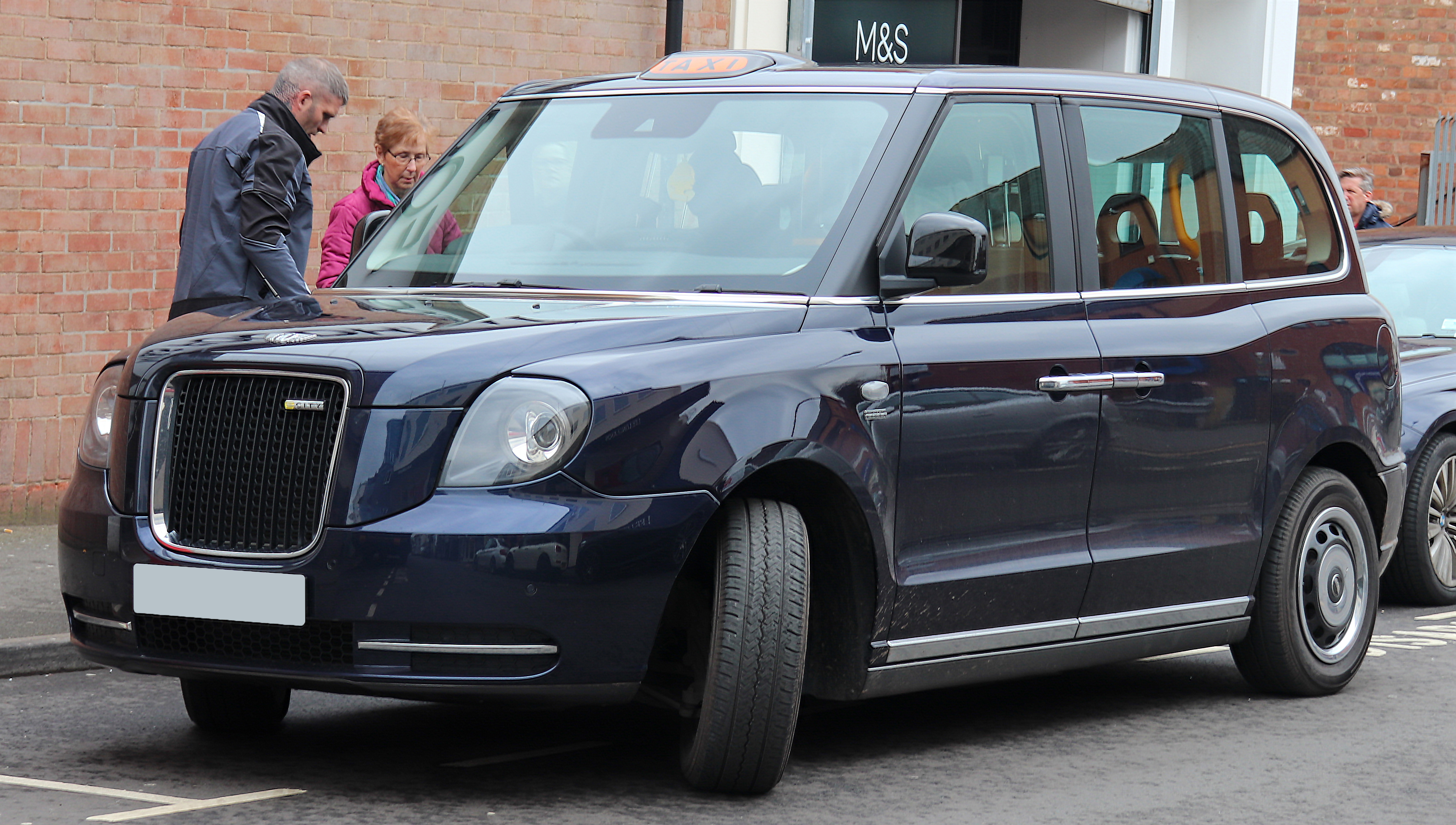
- 2019 LEVC TX Vista

Overview
- Manufacturer: London EV Company (Geely)
- Production: 2017–present
- Assembly: United Kingdom: Coventry (Ansty Park plant); China: Yiwu (Geely)
- Designer: David Ancona

Body and chassis
- Body style: Hackney carriage
- Layout: Front-engine, rear-wheel-drive
- Doors: Conventional doors (front); Coach doors (rear)
- Related: LEVC VN5

Powertrain
- Engine: Petrol plug-in hybrid: 1.5 L B3154T I3 (range extender)
- Electric motor: 2x 110 kW (150 PS) Siemens permanent magnet synchronous
- Hybrid drivetrain: Plug-in series hybrid
- Battery: 31 kW·h, 400 V lithium ion
- Range: 377 mi (607 km)
- Electric range: 80.6 mi (129.7 km)
- Plug-in charging: 22 kW AC; 50 kW DC

Dimensions
- Wheelbase: 2,986 mm (117.6 in)
- Length: 4,857 mm (191.2 in)
- Width: 1,874 mm (73.8 in)
- Height: 1,888 mm (74.3 in)
- Kerb weight: 2,230 kg (4,916 lb)

Chronology
- Predecessor: TX4

The LEVC TX (previously known as the TX5) is a purpose-built hackney carriage manufactured by the British commercial vehicle maker London EV Company (LEVC), a subsidiary of the Chinese carmaker Geely. It is the latest in a succession of purpose-built hackney carriages produced by LEVC and various predecessor entities. The LEVC TX is a plug-in hybrid range-extender electric vehicle.

The vehicle is designed to comply with Transport for London’s Taxi Private Hire regulations, which banned new diesel-powered taxis from January 2018, requiring zero-emissions capability.

== Background ==
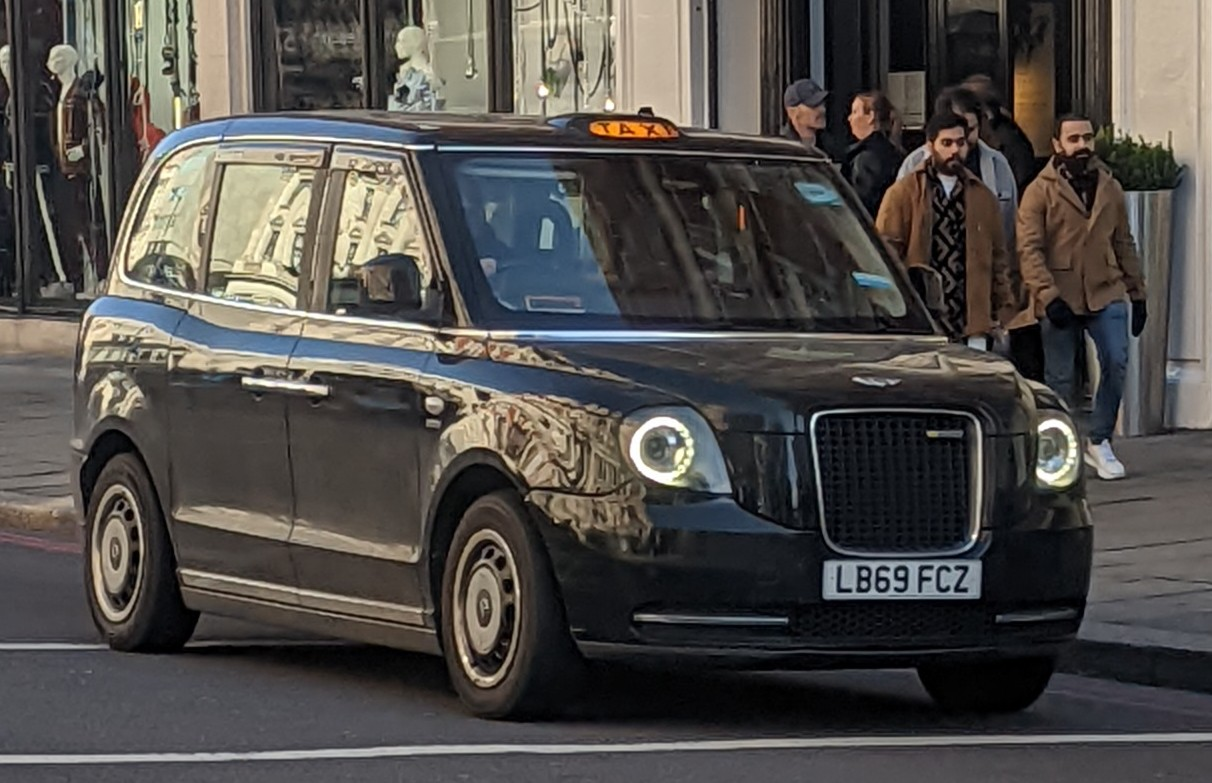
2019 LEVC TX Vista

In the late 2000s, Geely was in talks over the possibility of converting London's black cabs into electric-powered vehicles. From 2014, Geely invested £480m in LEVC to develop a new taxi, with a new factory to be built near Coventry. Geely hoped to manufacture 36,000 vehicles per annum. The vehicle entered production in 2017.

In January 2020, LEVC announced plans to market the TX in Japan with Fleetway and Service Company as the Japanese distributor. Deliveries were reported to be made in Q2 2020.

LEVC reported that taxis were sold in Azerbaijan for Baku Taxi Service in March 2020.

== Technical ==
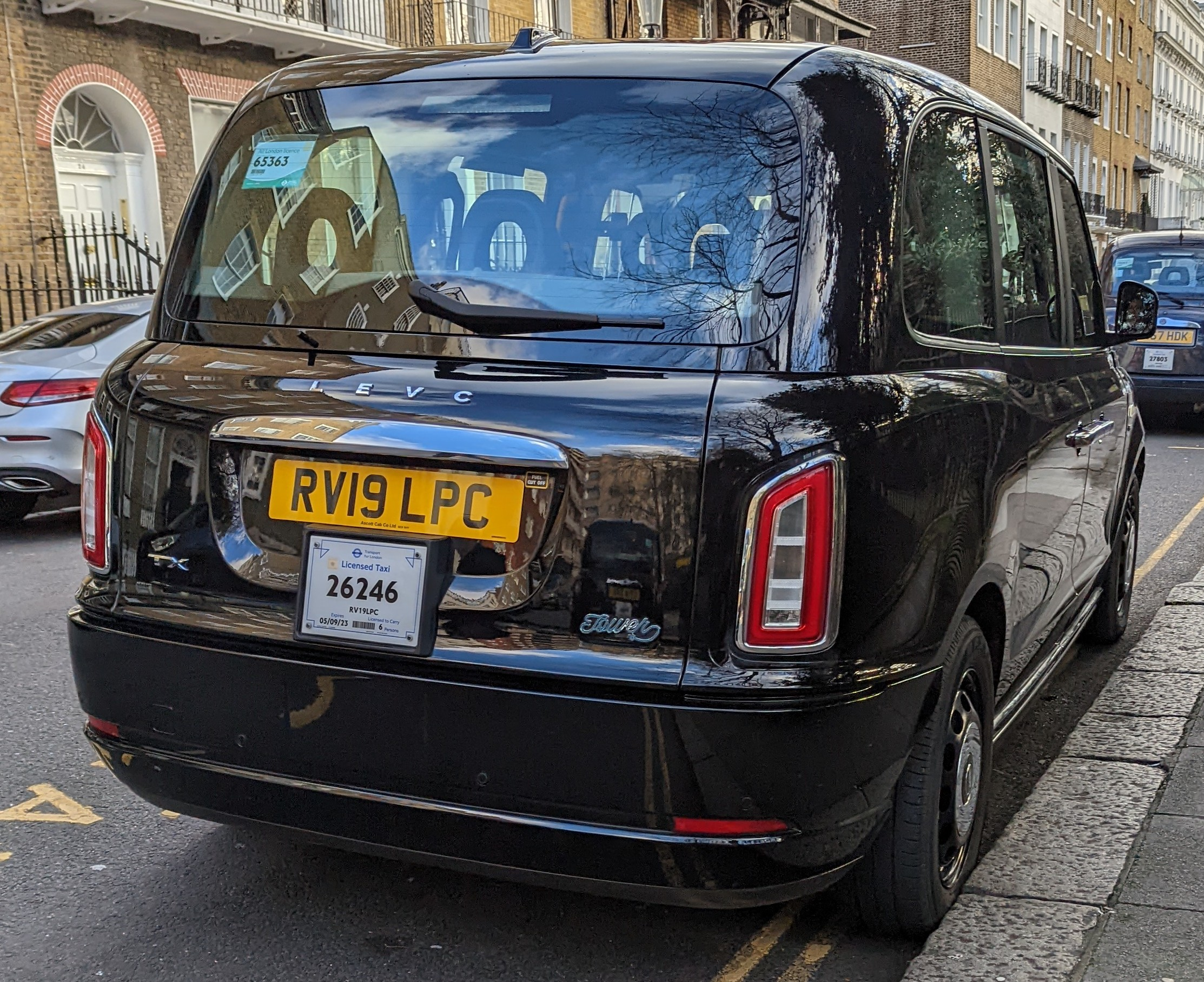
Rear view

The LEVC TX is built on a unique platform, underpinned by a bonded aluminium chassis built in the UK, giving the LEVC TX a 32 percent parts localisation rate by value. China and Europe each account for 32 percent of the content, while United States content is 4 percent.

The vehicle's styling is an evolution of the now iconic shape begun with the original Austin FX4 of 1958, and the later TX1/TXII/TX4 series, although the distinctive rear hinged "suicide doors" last seen on the FX4 have returned.

The LEVC TX is powered by a full-electric hybrid drivetrain. It drives in full-electric mode all the time, but is recharged by an 81-horsepower (60 kW; 82 PS) Volvo-sourced 1.5-litre turbocharged three-cylinder petrol engine.

The LEVC TX is fitted with a 33 kilowatt-hours (120 MJ) battery pack supplied by LG Chem, and powers a 110-kilowatt (148 hp; 150 PS) Siemens-built electric motor for traction.

When the battery pack has insufficient charge to power the vehicle, the petrol engine is claimed to achieve 36.7 mpg_{‑imp} (7.7 L/100 km; 30.6 mpg_{‑US}).

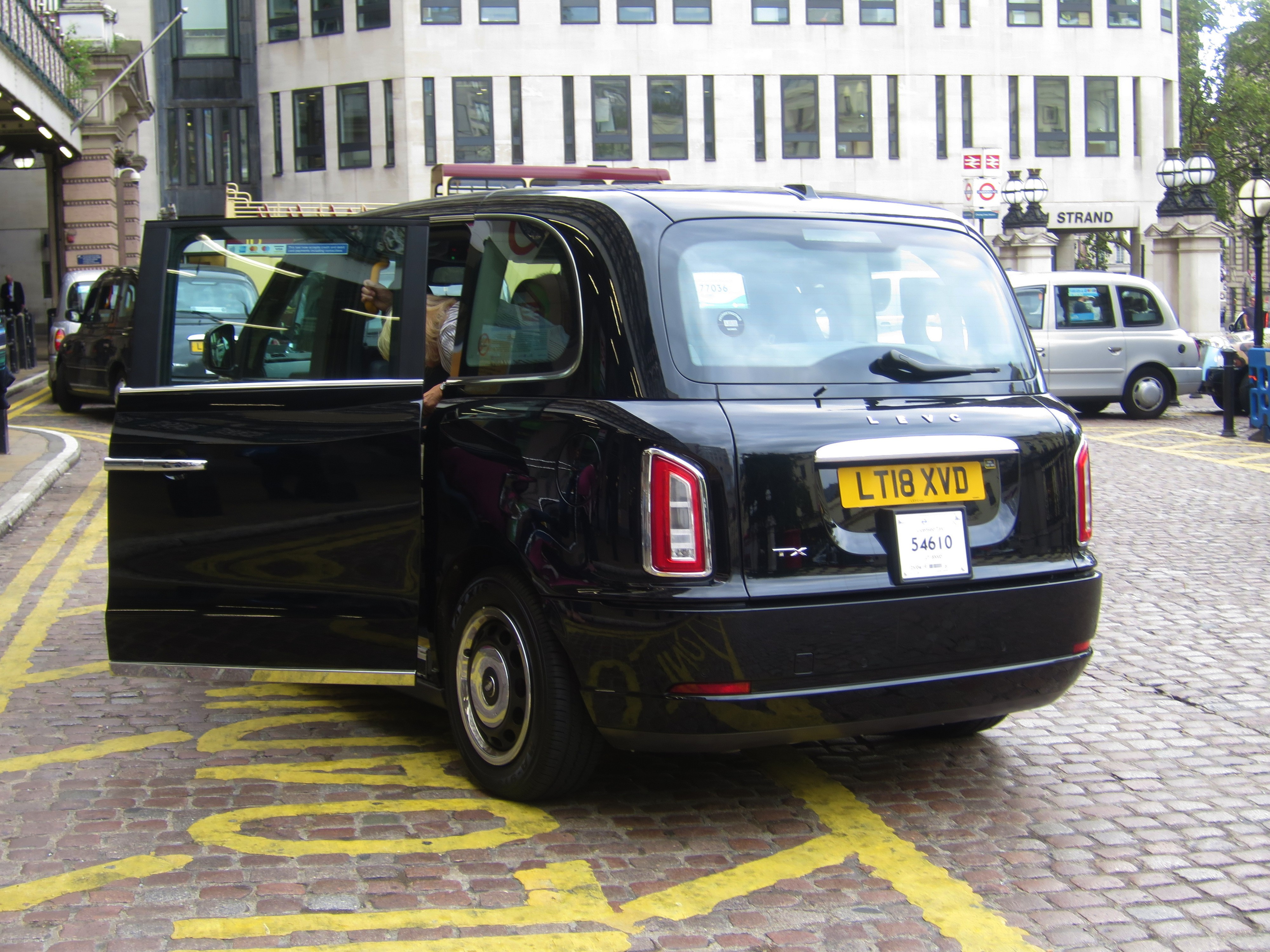
Suicide doors on the TX

The charge connectors are mounted either side of the radiator grille, and are a CCS socket, capable of 50 kW DC and 22 kW AC, and an optional 50 kW capable CHAdeMO connector.

In accordance to London taxi regulation, the LEVC TX offers a turning circle of 8.45 metres (27.7 ft) (4.23 m (13.9 ft) of radius) which made possible by the front wheels that turn up to 63 degrees, instead of the typical 38 degrees. The LEVC TX has a range of accessibility features including a wheelchair ramp (deployed by the driver when required), oversized entry doors, an audio induction loop and high contrast grab handles.

== Service history ==
The TX took advantage of Transport for London rules that allowed only zero-emission capable vehicles to become additions to the city's taxi fleet from 2018. By February 2018 it was the only taxi capable of meeting these rules.

By April 2022, over 5,000 TX vehicles has been sold in London, around a third of London's taxi fleet. In May 2022, LEVC announced that over 7,000 taxis had been sold worldwide. By December 2023, over half of London's taxi fleet were zero emission capable – with the majority being TXs. By March 2023 10,000 taxis had been manufactured.

Outside London, the TX5 also serves as a taxi in Austria, Australia, Azerbaijan, China, Denmark, France, Germany, Gibraltar, India, Israel, Japan, Poland, Spain and Switzerland.

== See also ==
- LEVC VN5, a plug-in hybrid panel van based on the LEVC TX
