= London EV Company =

English car manufacturing company

- Formerly: The London Taxi Corporation
- Type: Subsidiary
- Traded as: London Taxi Company (2013–2017); LEVC (2017–present)
- Industry: Automotive
- Predecessor: LTI Limited / Carbodies (Manganese Bronze Holdings)
- Founded: 11 January 2013; 13 years ago
- Headquarters: Ansty Park, Warwickshire, United Kingdom
- Key people: Christopher Allen (managing director); Alex Nan (UK CEO and Global CEO)
- Products: Automobiles
- Parent: Geely (100%)
- Website: levc.com

London EV Company Limited (LEVC), formerly The London Taxi Corporation Limited, is a British automotive manufacturer with its headquarters at Ansty Park near Coventry, England. It is a wholly owned subsidiary of Chinese automaker Geely. The company produces London's famous black taxicabs.

== History ==
Geely's involvement in British taxicab production began in 2006 when it partnered with London EV Company's predecessor, The London Taxi Company, and its parent Manganese Bronze Holdings, in the creation of a China-based taxicab manufacturing joint venture. In 2008, Geely considered the possibility of converting London's black cabs into electric-powered vehicles. In 2009 Geely bought shares in Manganese Bronze Holdings.

In 2012 Manganese Bronze Holdings entered administration due to lack of funding. In 2013 Geely rescued part of the business and created its own taxicab production company as The London Taxi Corporation Limited.

The joint venture, Shanghai LTI Automobile Components Co Ltd, made the TX4, a licensed London Black Cab, in Fengjing, Shanghai, and exports semi-complete knock-down kits for assembly in the UK.

From 2014, Geely invested £480m in LEVC to develop a new taxi. Much of the engineering is done by China Euro Vehicle Technology, a Geely subsidiary based in Gothenburg, Sweden. In March 2015, LEVC announced a new factory and offices would be built at Ansty Park, northeast of Coventry at a cost of £90m, creating 1,000 jobs. Geely hoped to manufacture 36,000 vehicles per annum.

In 2017, the company launched the new LEVC TX range-extended electric taxi and announced its intentions to begin production of electric commercial vehicles in addition to taxicabs.

In February 2025, LEVC was integrated into Geely Galaxy dealership network in the Chinese market. Its sole model in China, the LEVC L380, was rebranded as the Geely Galaxy LEVC L380.

=== Leadership ===
- Chris Gubbey (2016–2019)
- Joerg Hofmann (2019–2022)
- Alex Nan (2022–2026)
- Tony Chi (2026-present)

== Models ==
=== TX ===
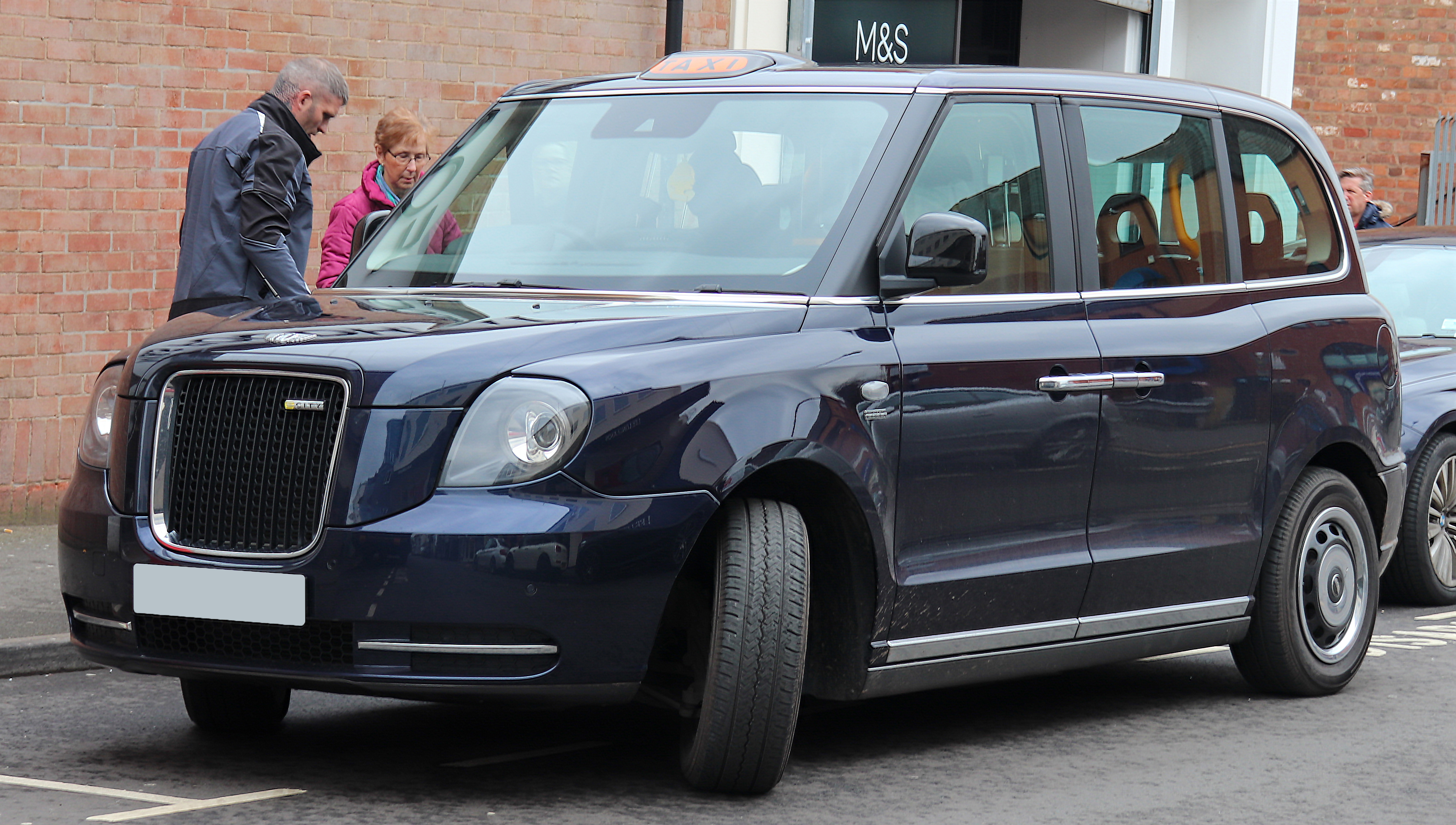
LEVC TX

Geely had been in talks over the possibility of converting London's black cabs into electric-powered vehicles. The company said it has held talks with UK government officials about the plan. The TX range extender electric vehicle is built at a new facility near Ansty Park, 5 miles (8 kilometres) northeast of Coventry. By April 2022, over 5,000 TX's has been sold in London, around a third of London's taxi fleet.

=== VN5 ===
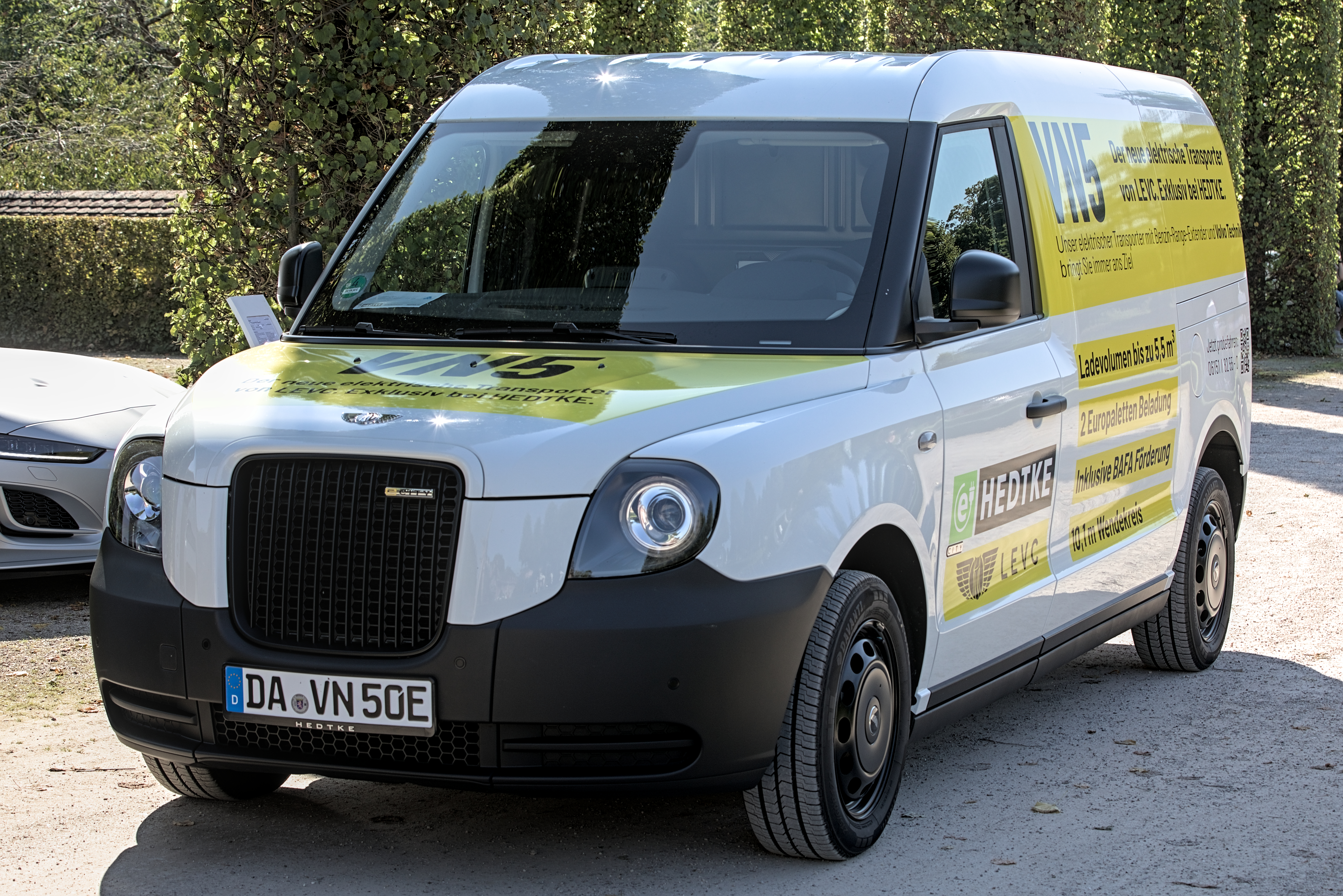
LEVC VN5

An electric van was revealed by LEVC on 17 June 2019 In March 2020, LEVC confirmed that the new van would be called LEVC VN5. It went on sale in the UK in 2020 and in the rest of Europe the following year.

=== Geely Galaxy L380 ===
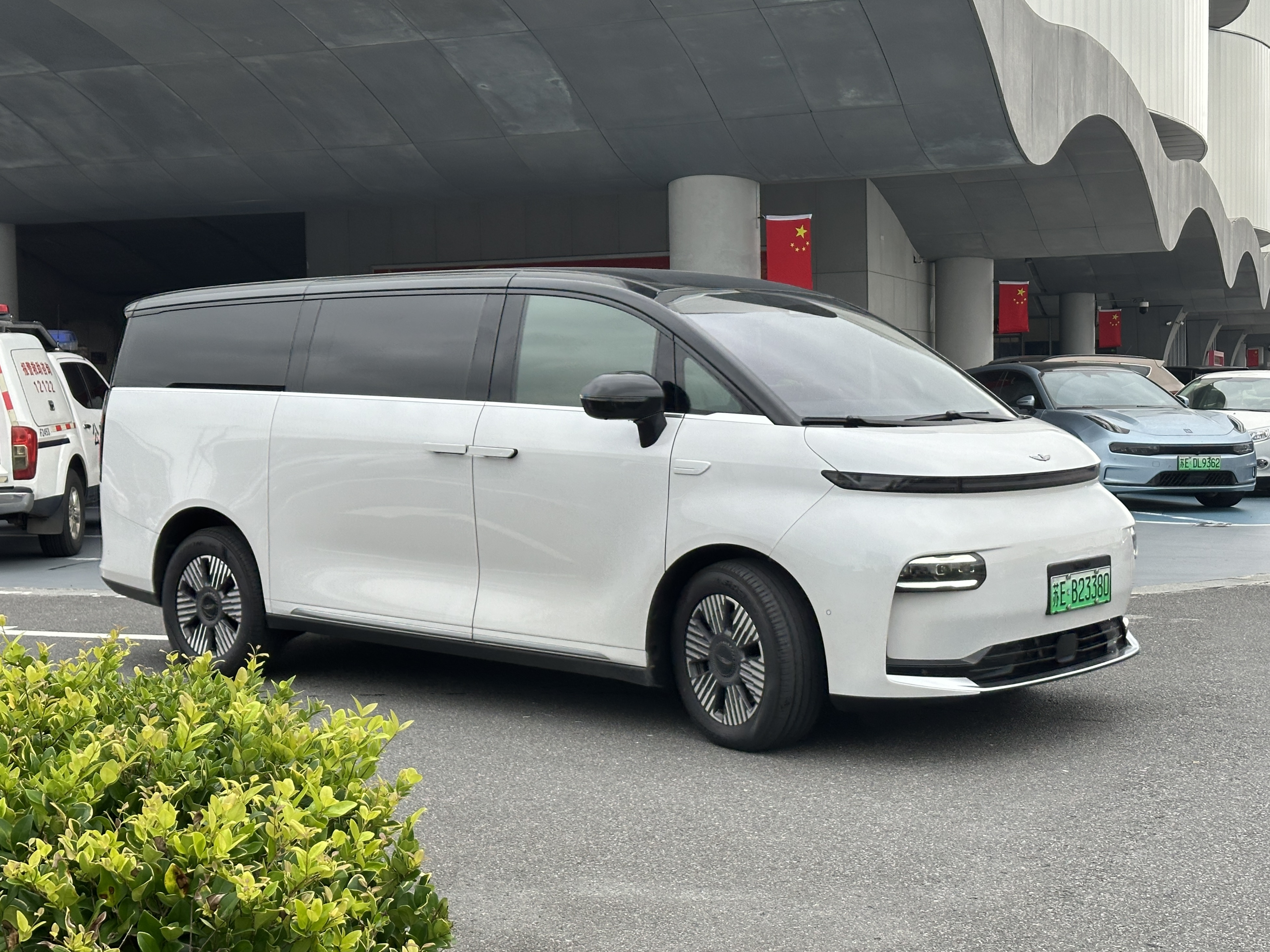
Geely Galaxy LEVC L380

LEVC revealed the L380 electric people carrier for the Chinese market in December 2023. With a length of 5.3 m (17 ft) and up to 4 rows and 8 seats inside, the name and stylistic cues of the L380 are based on those of the Airbus A380. Since February 2025, the vehicle has been renamed Geely Galaxy LEVC L380 in China, following the consolidation of LEVC into Geely Galaxy's sales network.
