= Sony Cyber-shot DSC-TX5 =

- Sony Cyber-shot DSC-TX5 and accessories

Overview
- Maker: Sony Group
- Type: Digital Still Camera

Lens
- Lens: Carl Zeiss Vario-Tessar (4x optical zoom)

Sensor/medium
- Sensor: Exmor R CMOS Sensor

Viewfinder
- Viewfinder: None

General
- LCD screen: TFT (3", touchscreen, 230,900 pixels)

The Sony Cyber-shot DSC-TX5 is a digital still camera announced by Sony on February 18, 2010. It boasts advanced features like Backlight Correction HDR, Hand-Held Twilight aided by the Exmor R CMOS sensor, and the intelligent panorama stitching mode, called the iSweep. The camera also has a waterproof body (up to 10 feet), which also makes it dust-proof. It is also freeze-proof for up to -10 °C and shock-proof, when dropped from a height of about 1.5 meters. Sony describes it as a rugged camera.

== Specifications ==
=== Technical specifications ===
Lens	
Optical Zoom	4x
Precision Digital Zoom	Approx.8x(Total)
Smart Zoom	up to 22x (with VGA)
F	3.5-4.6
Focal Length (f= mm)	4.43-17.7
Focal Length (f=35mm conversion)	25-100
Macro (cm)	iAuto(W:Approx.1 cm(0.39') to Infinity, T:Approx.50 cm(1.64') to Infinity) / Program Auto(W:Approx.8 cm(0.26') to Infinity, T:Approx.50 cm(1.64') to Infinity)
Filter Diameter (mm)	NO
Conversion Lens compatibility	NO
NightShot	NO
NightFraming	NO
Carl Zeiss Vario-Tessar Lens	YES
Sony G	NO
Image Sensory	
Sensor Type	Exmor R CMOS sensor
Size (Inches)	1/2.4 type(7.59mm)
Camera	
Effective Pixels (Mega Pixels)	Approx. 10.2
Bionz Processor	YES
Face Detection	YES
Smile Shutter	YES
Clear RAW NR	NO
Auto Focus Method (Single)	NO
Auto Focus Method (Monitoring)	NO
Auto Focus Method (Intelligent)	NO
Auto Focus Method (Continuous)	NO
Auto Focus Area (Multi Point)	9 points (Under Face Undetected)
Auto Focus Area (Centre weighted)	YES
Auto Focus Area (Spot)	YES
Auto Focus Area (Flexible Spot)	YES (Touch)
Aperture Auto Mode	YES
Aperture Priority Mode	NO
Aperture Manual Mode	NO
Shutter Speed Auto Mode (sec)	iAuto(2" - 1/1.600) / Program Auto(1" - 1/1.600)
NR Slow Shutter	YES
Hand Shake Alert	YES
Exposure Control	+/- 2.0EV, 1/ 3 EV step
White Balance	Auto, Daylight, Cloudy, Fluorescent1, Fluorescent2, Fluorescent3, Incandescent, Flash, One Push, One Push Set
Automatic White Balance	YES
Light Metering (Multi Pattern)	YES
Light Metering (Centre weighted)	YES
Light Metering (Spot)	YES
Sharpness Setting	NO
Saturation Setting	NO
Contrast Setting	NO
ISO Sensitivity (REI)	Auto / 125 / 200 / 400 / 800 / 1600 / 3200
Scene Selection	9 modes (Twilight / Twilight Portrait / Twilight using a tripod / Backlight / Backlight Portrait / Landscape / Macro / Portrait / Close Focus)
AF Illuminator	YES
Flash Mode	Auto / Flash On / Slow Syncro / Flash Off
Distance limitations using Flash (m)	ISO Auto: Approx.0.08-Approx.2.9m(Approx.0.26'-Approx.9.51')(W) / Approx.0.5-Approx.2.4m(Approx.1.64'-Approx.7.87')(T), ISO3200: up to Approx.6.0m(Approx19.7)(W) / Approx.4.7m(Approx15.4')(T)
Pre-flash	YES
Red-eye Reduction	YES
Auto Daylight Synchronized Flash	YES
Super SteadyShot	
Super SteadyShot capability	NO
SteadyShot capability	NO
Optical SteadyShot capability	YES
Auto Focus System	
AF Illuminator	YES
Built-In-Flash	
Flash Mode	Auto / Flash On / Slow Syncro / Flash Off
Red-Eye Reduction	YES
Auto Daylight Synchronized Flash	YES
LCD/ Viewfinder	
LCD Screen Size	7.5 cm / 3.0"
LCD Total Dots Number	230.400
LCD Monitor Type	TFT
Auto Bright Monitoring	YES
Optical Viewfinder	NO
Electronic Viewfinder	NO
Dimensions	
Width	94mm
Height	56.9mm
Depth	17.7mm

=== Lens ===
The camera has a Carl Zeiss lens, with 4x zoom capability, though the digital zoom can go up to 8x. The focal length of the lens is 4.43 - 17.7 mm.

=== LCD screen ===
The camera does not have a viewfinder. It is equipped with 3 inch touchscreen TFT display, which covers the entire back side of the device. It has about 230,400 usable pixels on the screen.

== Special Features ==
=== iSweep Panorama ===
The DSC-TX5 can capture large panorama shots. Up to a hundred shots are taken by sweeping the camera from one side to the other. The camera can be swept from left-to-right, right-to-left and even up-to-down and down-to-up for vertical panoramas. It intelligently stitches the photos together and reduces the blur from moving subjects. It has support for up to 258° panoramic shots, which gives a 7,152 x 1,080 dimension image.

=== Face Detection ===
The DSC-TX5 is also equipped with face detection technology, which recognizes up to 8 faces on the screen. It can also focus specifically on adult or child faces and also has an optional Smile Shutter, which detects a smile and automatically shoots an image.

== Recording mode ==
The Cyber-shot DSC-TX5 is compatible with Memory Stick Duo, Memory Stick PRO Duo, Memory Stick PRO-HG Duo, media and SD/SDHC/SDXC media. It cannot shoot video onto a Memory Stick Duo. It also has built-in 45 MB internal memory for emergency use.
