= Manganese Bronze Holdings =

British engineering company

Manganese Bronze Holdings plc
- Industry: Automotive
- Founded: 10 March 1899
- Defunct: 2013
- Fate: Liquidated
- Headquarters: Coventry, United Kingdom
- Revenue: £74.98 million (2011)
- Operating income: (£1.31 million) (pre-exceptionals) (2011)
- Net income: (£2.63 million) (pre-exceptionals) (2011)
- Total assets: £58.8 million (31 December 2011)
- Total equity: £16 million (31 December 2011)
- Number of employees: 274 (2012)
- Subsidiaries: LTI Limited

Manganese Bronze Holdings plc (MBH) was the holding company of LTI Limited. The firm's sole business in its final years as a company was London black taxicab manufacturing through the LTI subsidiary.

The Manganese Bronze and Brass Co was founded in 1881, incorporated in 1882 and originally made ship propellers, operating from factories in London. By World War II, it was also extruding and rolling specialised alloys, and in the 1950s expanded into light alloy product manufacturing. In the early 1960s, it shortened its name to Manganese Bronze and became an important conglomerator of British motorcycle marques. The company acquired the subsidiary Carbodies in 1973, which was involved in the design, development and production of taxicabs. This subsidiary eventually became LTI Limited, and traded first as London Taxis International and then as The London Taxi Company. The sale of its components division in 2003 left the company with LTI Limited as its only operating division.

In October 2012, MBH entered administration, having not made a profit since 2007. The Chinese automotive manufacturer Geely, which already owned 20% of the shares in LTI Limited, the company's only business, agreed to purchase LTI's principal assets and trade from the administrator to save the business and continue the production of taxis in Coventry. The new holding company was named The London Taxi Corporation, and it traded as The London Taxi Company (as LTI had done). This successor company was renamed to London EV Company in 2017.

== Company history ==
=== Propeller and light alloy product manufacture ===
What became the Manganese, Bronze and Brass Co was founded in 1876 as P.M. Parsons, incorporated in 1882 and originally made Parsons Alloy (copper and manganese) ship propellers, operating from Thames-side factories in Deptford and, later, Millwall, London. It expanded into alloy products, and in World War I was contracted by the Ministry of Munitions to produce shell cases. As its London location put it at risk of enemy air-raids, the shell case factory was moved to Ipswich. During World War II, its propeller works was moved to Birkenhead. A takeover of Redro Ltd in 1959 gave the firm a presence in Beverley and new light alloy product capabilities. In 1962, it shortened its name to Manganese Bronze. In 1963 Stone-Platt took over the marine division based at Birkenhead, and the company converted into a holding company, Manganese Bronze Holdings Ltd, with two operating subsidiaries: Manganese Bronze Ltd at Ipswich and Alpax Ltd at Willesden and Beverley.

=== Automotive engineering ===
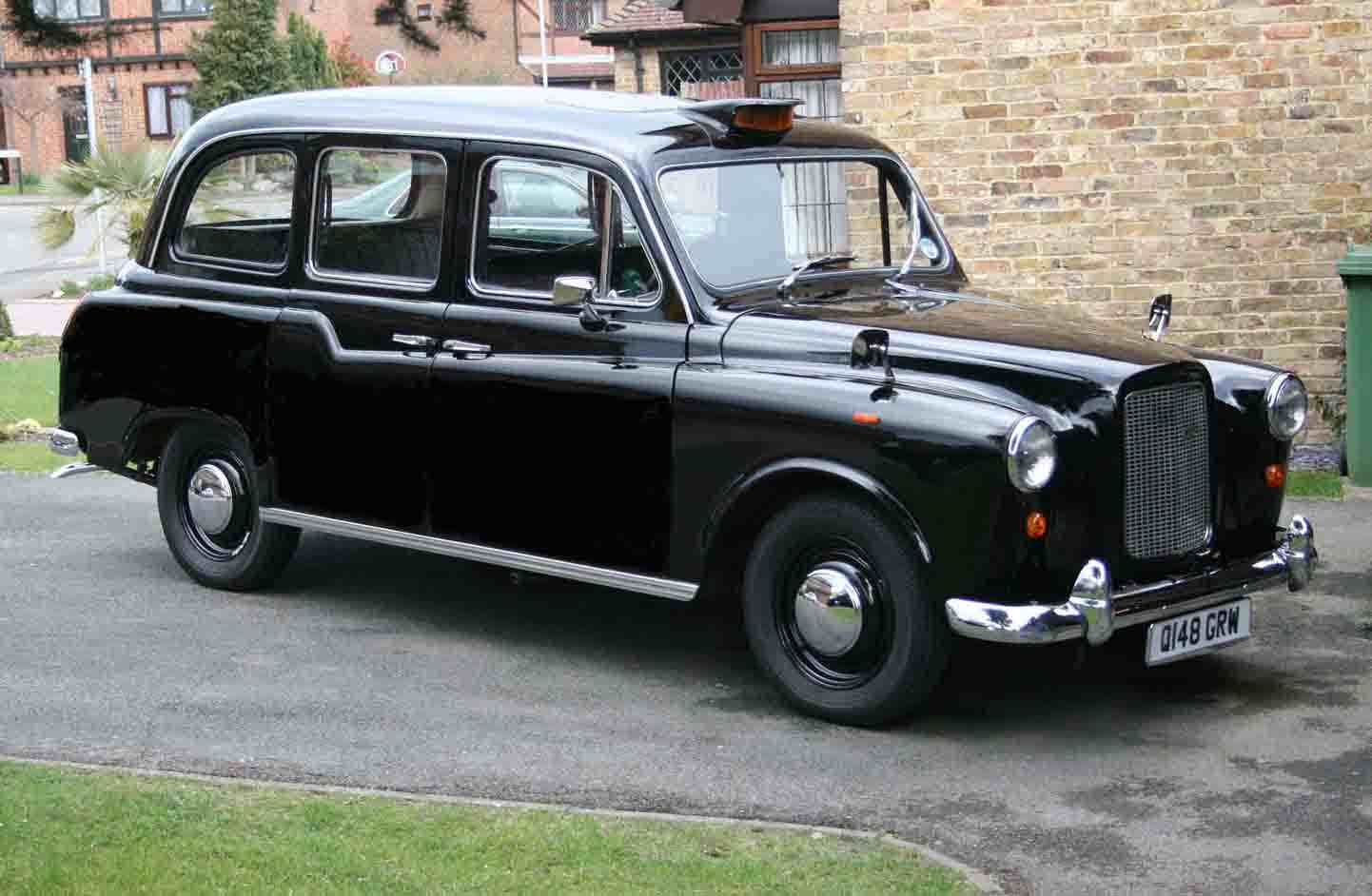
Austin/Carbodies FX4

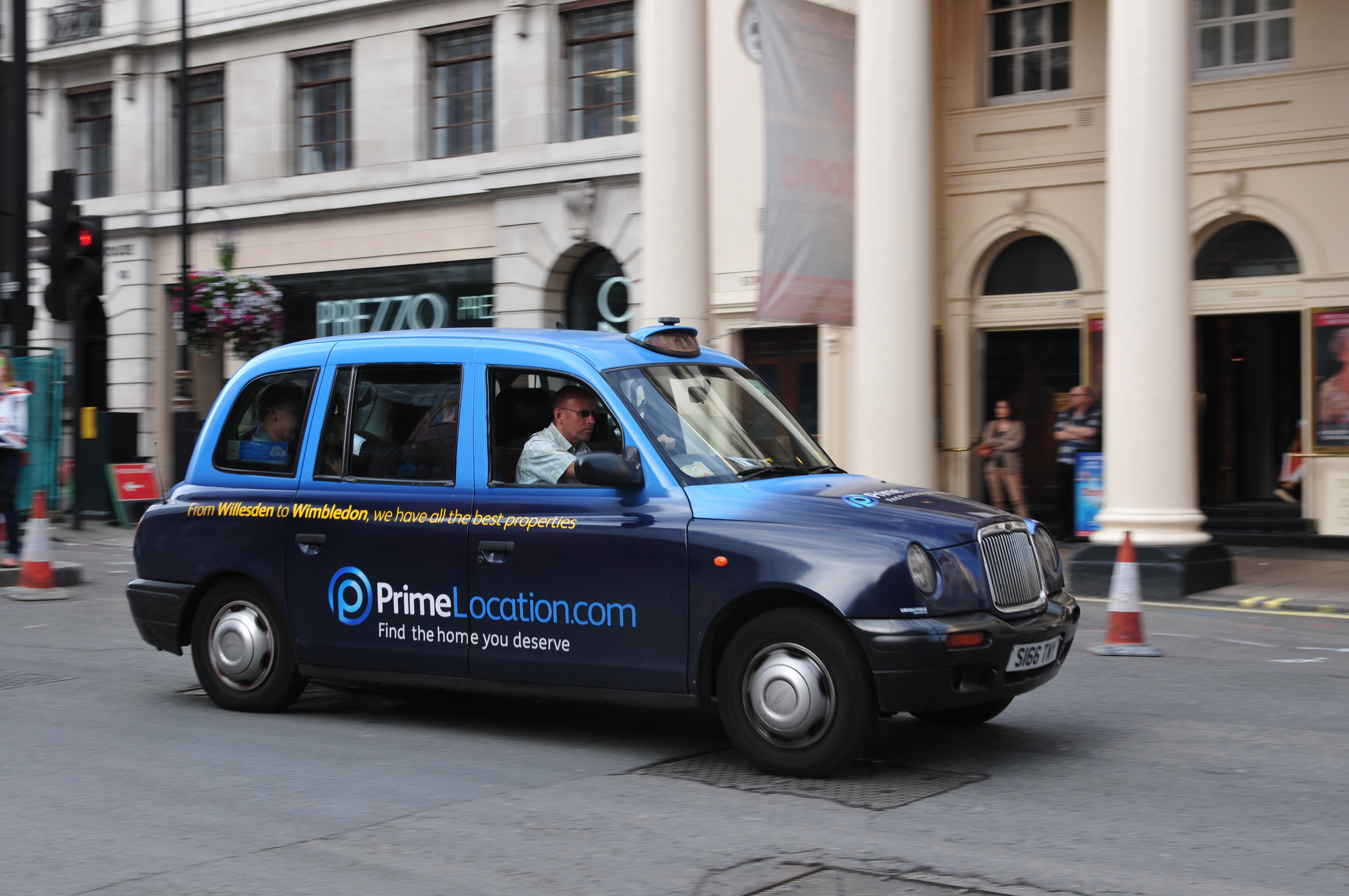
LTI TX1

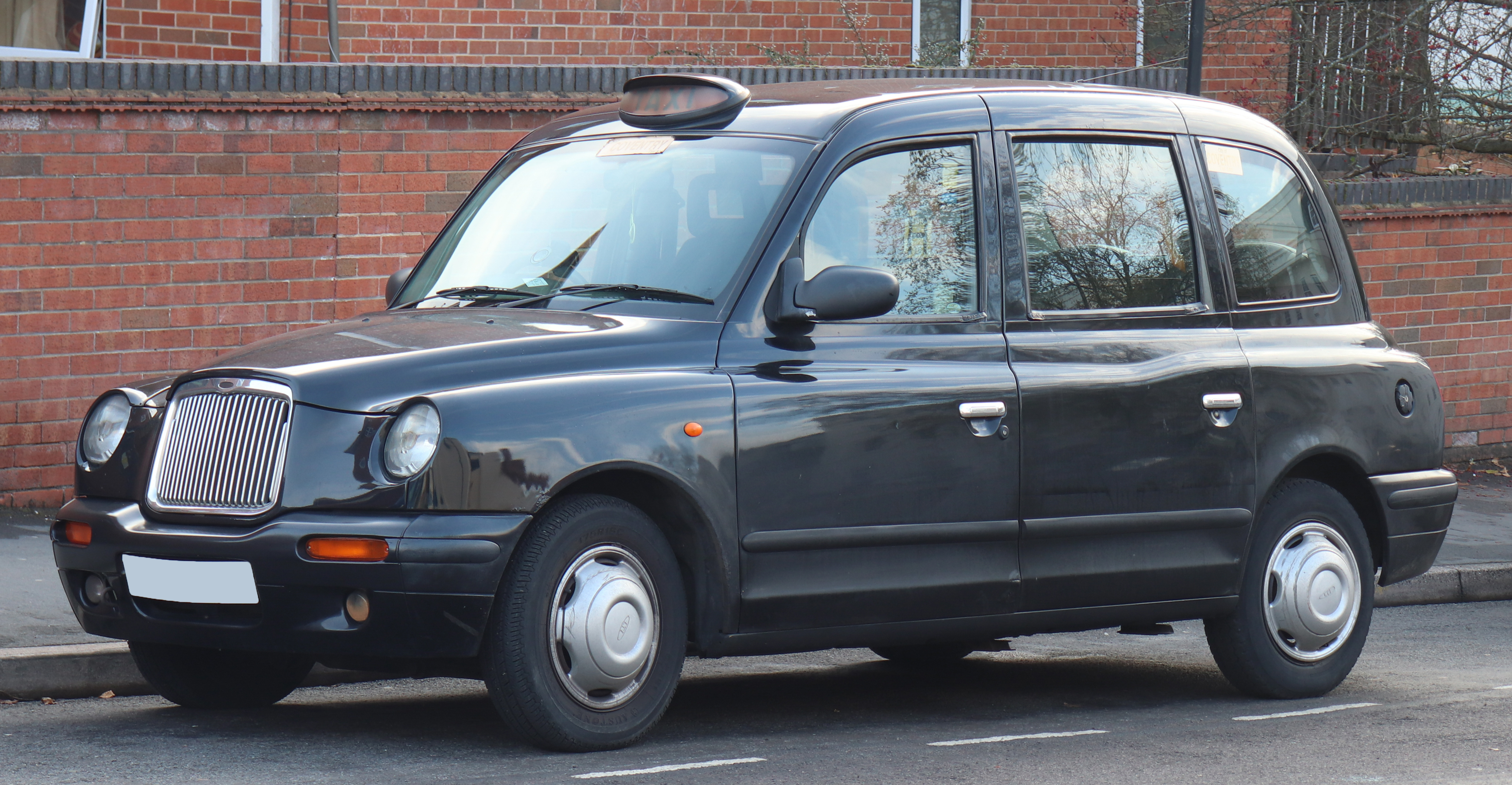
LTI TXII

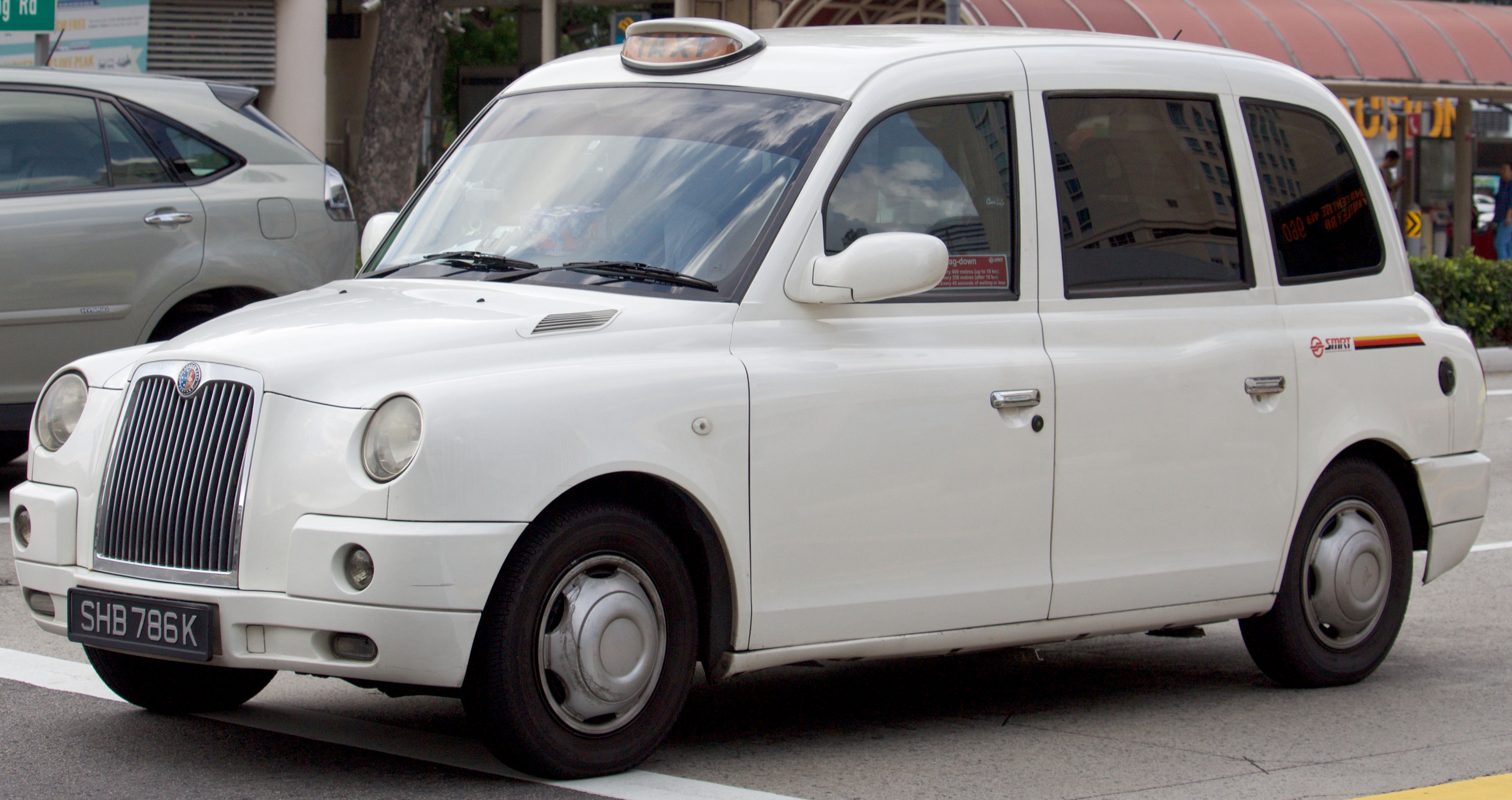
LTI TX4

In the early 1960s Manganese Bronze Bearings Ltd (as it was then known) was taken over by a Dennis Poore investment vehicle, Villiers Engineering Ltd, a motorcycle company chiefly known for its range of engines, creating Manganese Bronze Holdings Ltd. This company subsequently bought Associated Motor Cycles Ltd, owners of the Norton, AJS and Matchless motorcycle brands in 1964.

Manganese absorbed part of the Birmingham Small Arms Company in 1973 - which included Carbodies, the Coventry-based London taxicab maker, under chairman Dennis Poore, as part of a rescue plan initiated by the British government. BSA Motorcycles interests trading as Triumph were combined with Manganese motorcycle production to form Norton Villiers Triumph. BSA Guns was liquidated in 1986. BSA's components businesses became Manganese Bronze Components Division, comprising sintering, precision casting and metal powders; this division was sold in 2003 and went bankrupt a short period later.

In 1984, the London taxicab dealer Mann & Overton was bought by Manganese. In 1992 the name Carbodies Limited was dropped and the company was renamed LTI Limited, comprising three divisions: LTI Carbodies, LTI Mann and Overton and London Taxi Finance. The trading name was London Taxis International.

In January 2003 Manganese launched Zingo Taxi, an innovative taxi hailing system using mobile location technology. This was sold to Computer Cab in November 2004 for £1. This was to stem large losses because only 1,100 of London's approximately 21,000 taxi drivers subscribed. Between July 2003 and November 2004 Manganese also sold its property portfolio, including the land under its Coventry manufacturing facility.

=== Partnership with Geely ===
In October 2006 Manganese and the Chinese automaker Geely announced the creation of a China-based taxicab manufacturing joint venture. An extraordinary general meeting held in January 2007 of Manganese's shareholders approved the formation of the joint venture. In June 2008 Manganese announced the production of the first prototype TX4 taxi at its Chinese joint venture, LTI Shanghai.

In July 2008 Manganese announced that it would be making redundant 40 employees as a result of the global economic downturn.

On 29 June 2009 the company advised that Geely had a notifiable interest in 6,085,000 of the company's ordinary shares, representing 19.971% of the issued ordinary share capital.

In March 2010 it was announced that Manganese would move the production of all taxicab bodies and chassis to Shanghai, but TX4 cabs for the UK market would continue to be assembled in Coventry. In the same month it was reported that Geely would increase its shareholding in Manganese to 51% through participation in a placing of new shares. In August 2010 it was announced that Geely had decided not to proceed with the share placement and its shareholding in Manganeze would remain at just under 20%. In November 2010, LTI changed their trading name to "The London Taxi Company" to reflect the company's core business.

=== Administration ===
Manganese entered administration on 22 October 2012 after failing to secure additional funding; PricewaterhouseCoopers (PwC) were appointed as the administrator. On 31 October PwC announced that 156 Manganese staff in the UK were to be made redundant with immediate effect, out of the company's then total of 274 employees in the country, with the losses spread across its manufacturing facility, head office and dealerships.

=== Rescue of the taxicab business ===
In January 2013, it was reported that Geely was in negotiations to buy the remaining shares of the company from PwC to save the business. A press statement in February 2013 announced that an agreement had been reached for Geely to purchase the remainder of the London Taxi Company's assets, manufacturing rights, unsold stock and dealerships. Geely set up a new company, The London Taxi Corporation Ltd. under its British subsidiary Geely UK Ltd to resume assembly of the London black cab in Coventry.
