= Combe Fields =

Civil parish in Warwickshire, England

Coordinates: 52.42°N 1.40°W

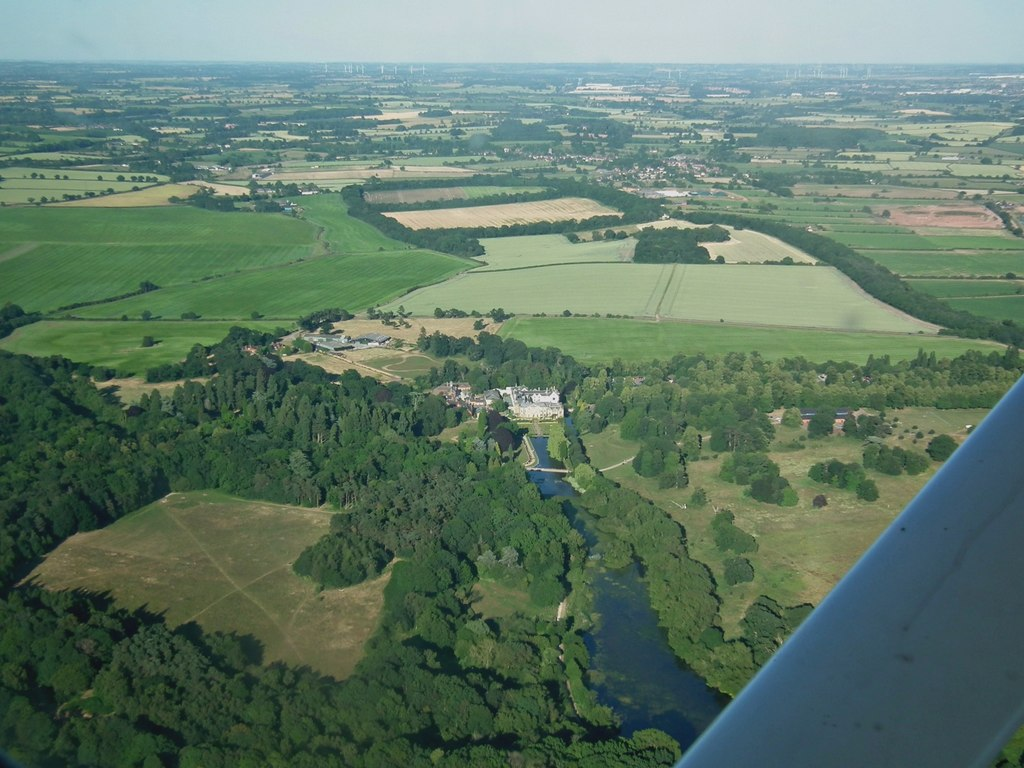
- Aerial view from west looking east over Coombe Abbey and the Combe Fields parish

- Location within Warwickshire
- Population: 131 (2021)
- Civil parish: Combe Fields
- District: Rugby
- Shire county: Warwickshire
- Region: West Midlands
- Country: England
- Sovereign state: United Kingdom

Combe Fields is a civil parish in the Rugby district, in the county of Warwickshire, England. The parish has no village, but contains Coombe Abbey, after which it is named, and a few isolated houses. In the 2001 census the parish had a population of 114, increasing to 126 at the 2011 census, and 131 at the 2021 census.

The parish also contains Ansty Park, a business park where Cadent Gas and the London Electric Vehicle Company have their headquarters. The business park is on the former site of Ansty Aerodrome, a military airfield in operation from 1936 until 1953 and primarily used for training. To the south of Ansty Park is a Rolls-Royce factory that manufactures components for aircraft engines. Between 1946 and 1971, rocket motors were developed and tested at the site.

At the time of the Domesday Book the parish was called Smite, which contained two settlements of Upper and Lower Smite; these were both deserted in the 12th or 13th century when Monks from Coombe Abbey enclosed the fields to create sheep pastures. The old parish name is retained in Smite Brook, Smeeton Lane and Smite Hill. The remains of the medieval church of St Peter of Lower Smite was converted into a house called Peter Hall in the 16th century.
