= Ado =

Ado or ADO may refer to:

== Businesses and organizations ==
- ADO (band), a Chinese rock band
- ADO Den Haag, a football club in the Netherlands
- Air Do (ICAO:ADO), a Japanese airline
- Austin Drawing Office, the design and engineering department of the British Motor Corporation (1952–1968)
- Assyrian Democratic Organization, a political organization in Syria
- Australian Defence Organisation, the Australian Defence Force and the Australian Department of Defense
- Autobuses de Oriente, a passenger bus company in Mexico

== People ==
- Ado (name), a list of people with the given name
- A-do (born 1973), a Singaporean singer
- Ado (footballer) (born 1944), Brazilian goalkeeper
- Ado (singer) (born 2002), a Japanese singer
- Ado of Friuli (died 695 AD), a Lombard duke
- Alassane Dramane Ouattara (born 1942), Ivorian politician, often known by his initials ADO
- Igor Dmitrievich Ado (1910–1983), Russian mathematician

== Places ==
- Ado, Benue State, a town and Local Government Area in Nigeria
- Ado Ekiti, a city in Nigeria
- Ado-Odo, an ancient town in Ogun State, Nigeria
- Andamooka Airport in South Australia, Australia (IATA airport code ADO)

== Science and technology ==
- ActiveX Data Objects, a Microsoft API
- Adenosine, a nucleoside
- ADO.NET, a Microsoft database API
- Ado's theorem, a theorem in abstract algebra
- Ampex Digital Optics, a digital video effects system
- Azure DevOps, a Microsoft software development tool

== Other uses ==
- Ado (film), a 2025 short by Sam Henderson
- A-Do (manga), a manga series
- Adjora language (ISO 639-3: ado), a Ramu language of Papua New Guinea
- Assistant District Officer, a subsidiary rank to a district officer in British colonies
- Assistant divisional officer, a former rank in British fire brigades
- ADO Den Haag, a Dutch association football club from The Hague
- Ado TV, the former name of Beninese television channel Bénin TV Junior
