= Austin Drawing Office =

Former design and engineering department of the British Motor Corporation

The Austin Drawing Office (abbreviated to ADO) was the primary research and development office of the British Motor Corporation (BMC), and subsequently that of the Austin-Morris division of British Leyland (BL).

From the early 1950s, the projects of the office were known by the initials ADO. The numbers were assigned to vehicle and engineering projects, some resulting in production models. The ADO numbering system continued well beyond BMC's absorption into BL, who continued to use the convention (not, however on any former Leyland Motors marques such as Rover or Triumph) until the late 1970s. Various other conventions were used in other BL divisions and subsidiaries, and subsequently through the conglomerate's various restructurings and reorganisations, all the way through to its final incarnations as the Rover Group and MG Rover Group - this article attempts to explain all of these.

Contrary to popular belief, ADO does not stand for Amalgamated Drawing Office, the "austin" referring back to the Longbridge design office prior to the merger of Austin and Morris in 1952 to form the British Motor Corporation.

== XC project codes ==
The XC codes (eXperimental Car) were applied to projects headed by Alec Issagonis at Longbridge. All except XC9000 became production models.

- XC9000 Forerunner to the XC9001; resembled a Citroën due to the lengthened wheelbase. Did not enter production.
- XC9001 Initially a front-drive XC9000, but restyled by Longbridge and Pininfarina. Renamed XC9005 in 1960.
- XC9002 BMC 1100/1300; initially a scaled-down XC9001, but restyled by Pininfarina. Known as ADO16 from around July 1959.
- XC9003 Mini, also known as ADO15.
- XC9005 BMC 1800/2200; refined and re-engined XC9001; known as ADO17 from 1960.

== ADO project numbers ==
- ADO6 Austin FX4 Taxi
- ADO8 Austin A40 Farina MkI
- ADO9 BMC Farina "B" models: Austin A55 Cambridge MkII, Morris Oxford Series V, MG Magnette MkIII, Riley 4/68, Wolseley 15/60
- ADO10 BMC Farina "C" models: Austin Westminster A99, Wolseley 6/99
- ADO11 475cc 2-cylinder A-Series engine that never reached production, essentially half a 948cc A-Series.
- ADO12 Hydrostatic transmission, installed in an Austin A35 prototype
- ADO13 Austin-Healey Sprite MkI
- ADO14 Austin Maxi
- ADO15 Mini MkI and MkII (except Cooper versions), Riley Elf, Wolseley Hornet; renamed from project XC9003
- ADO16 1100/1300; renamed from project XC9002
- ADO17 Austin 1800 & 2200, Morris 1800 & 2200, Wolseley 18/85 & Six; renamed from project XC9005
- ADO19 Austin Ant, cancelled as it would interfere with Land Rover sales
- ADO20 Mini MkIII and Clubman
- ADO21 Proposed mid-engine MG sports car to replace the MGB. Cancelled in favor of the Triumph Bullet, which ultimately became the TR7.
- ADO22 Proposed facelift for the Austin 1100/1300, cancelled and replaced by the ADO67
- ADO23 MGB
- ADO24 Austin-Healey 4000, 4.0 liter version of the Austin-Healey 3000; cancelled by British Leyland
- ADO25 BMC E-series engine 6-cylinder
- ADO26 Austin Healey 3000 MkIII
- ADO27 First used in the early 1960s for a proposed facelift for the Riley 1.5 and Wolseley 1500. Used a second time in 1968 for a proposed facelift for Austin and Morris 1800, but cancelled at an early stage; code passed on to the X6 project (later designated YDO19 Austin Kimberley).
- ADO28 Morris Marina
- ADO30 BMC Fireball XL5, a proposed replacement for the Austin-Healey 3000, but cancelled as it would have competed with the Jaguar E-type
- ADO31 MGA 1600
- ADO32 BMC E-Series engine 4-cylinder
- ADO34 Mini-based 2 seat roadster proposed as a MG Midget and Austin-Healey Sprite replacement; two versions of ADO34 were built: one by Austin at Longbridge and the other by MG at Abington. The Longbridge car was built (and probably styled) by Pininfarina, while the Abington car looked like a shrunken MGB and was built in-house at the MG factory. Cancelled in 1964 due to the MGB as well as excellent sales of the Midget and Sprite.
- ADO35 Coupe version of the Austin-built ADO34
- ADO36 Austin-Healey versions of ADO34 and ADO35, based on the MG-built ADO34
- ADO37 Vanden Plas Princess 3 litre
- ADO38 BMC 1600 Farina range Riley 4/72, Morris Oxford Farina, Wolseley 16/60, Magnette MkIV
- ADO39 Proposed FX4 Taxi replacement, cancelled
- ADO40 Austin Freeway and Wolseley 24/80 MkI
- ADO41 (Australia) Austin Freeway Utility prototype
- ADO41 (UK) Austin-Healey Sprite MkII
- ADO44 Austin A40 Farina MkII
- ADO46 Farina B-Series diesel models
- ADO47 MG Midget MkI, rebadged ADO42
- ADO49 Farina B-series pickup truck based on Riley 4; built and sold in Argentina
- ADO50 Mini Cooper and Cooper S
- ADO51 Austin-Healey 3000 MkIV, a rebadged MGC; cancelled by Donald Healey
- ADO52 MGC
- ADO53 revised ADO10, became the Austin A110 Westminster and Wolseley 6/110
- ADO56 "MG Sport" project, based on a lengthened Mini floorpan. It was very close to entering production.
- ADO58 Joint BMC/Rolls-Royce/Bentley coupe project; planned to have been based on a short-wheelbase version of the Bentley Burma (forerunner to the 1965 T1). It would have been built and marketed exclusively by BMC, using the F60 six-cylinder engine. Never reached production.
- ADO59 Morris Minor 1000
- ADO61 Austin 3-Litre; replacement for ADO53
- ADO66 Vanden Plas Princess 4-litre R
- ADO67 Austin Allegro
- ADO68 "Project Condor" sports car projects; cancelled by British Leyland
  - ADO68/28-1: Roy Haynes-styled 2-door coupe version of the Marina
  - ADO68/28-2: Michelotti-styled version. Revised at BLMC as the ADO68/28-2; hinted at the shape of the two-door Marina
  - ADO68/14: Designed by Harris Mann and based on the Maxi; may have led to the ADO71
  - ADO68/67: Based on the Allegro
- ADO69 Proposed FX4 Taxi replacement, cancelled
- ADO70 Calypso, a Michelotti-styled front drive replacement for the MG Midget; based on the ADO20
- ADO71 Austin/Morris 18-22/Princess; replacement for ADO17
- ADO73 Morris Marina Series 2; originally intended as a front-end facelift, but became the O-Series version
- ADO73 F/L Morris Ital
- ADO74 Concept supermini model as a possible Mini replacement, cancelled in 1974
- ADO75 MGB GT V8
- ADO76 Proposed MGB replacement, styled by Michelotti; resulted in the rubber-bumper model
- ADO77 Proposed second generation Morris Marina that never reached production and due to a lack of funding, was merged with the Rover SD2 project in 1975 to form the Triumph TM1
- ADO88 Supermini, cancelled due to unfavorable reviews from customer clinics; became project LC8 and then Mini Metro
- ADO99 Proposed replacement for the Allegro; became project LC10, then LM10 and finally Austin Maestro

== Post ADO project codes ==
Various conventions were used from the early 1970s within British Leyland and subsequently the Rover Group, even though the Austin-Morris division of BL continued to use the ADO convention until the company's collapse and subsequent Ryder Report restructuring in 1975.

=== Specialist Division codes ===
The Specialist Division (SD) encompassed Rover and Triumph. Only four projects were ever pursued during its existence before the division was renamed Jaguar Rover Triumph, and integrated within Leyland Cars in 1976.

- SD1 Rover 3500/2300/2600, Rover P6 replacement, launched in 1976. The "Rover SD1" name entered the public domain as an umbrella term for this whole model series, even though it was never officially used in the marketing of the cars.
- SD2 Proposed Triumph Dolomite replacement, merged into the ADO77 project in 1975.
- SD3 Rover 213/216 - the SD3 code was used retroactively for the 1984 Triumph Acclaim replacement, even though the Specialist Division itself had long been disbanded within BL, and Rover was now part of the Austin Rover Group, therefore logically the LC or AR convention would have been used.
- SD5 Proposed Land Rover replacement, cancelled due to a lack of funding and a waiting list for the Land Rover and Range Rover.

=== Triumph-Morris (TM) codes ===
- TM1 Joint replacement for the Triumph Dolomite/Sprint and the Morris Marina. This superseded the cancelled SD2 and ADO77 projects, but this too was scrapped and replaced by the LM10 and LM11 (Austin Maestro/Montego).

=== LC/LM/AR codes ===
Following the various reorganisations of BMC, and the creation of the combined Leyland Cars division of British Leyland, the codes changed to LC in the mid-1970s. Following the merger of Rover's Specialist Division SD codes, these resulted in LM (Light Medium) codes.

- LC8 Austin Metro, referred to as ADO88 in early development
- LC9 Triumph Acclaim, also referred to as "Project Bounty" during early development.
- LC10 Austin Maestro, later becoming LM10, referred to as ADO99 in early development.
- LC40 Jaguar XJ40 used this designation during 1977, reverted to XJ40 for 1978
- LM11 Austin Montego, referred to as LC11 in early development
- LM12 Proposed coupe version of Maestro, cancelled
- LM14 Proposed hatchback derivative of the Montego which would have been a direct replacement for the Princess, cancelled in favour of LM19
- LM15 Proposed replacement for the Rover SD1; dropped in favor of Project XX and eventually the Rover 800
- LM19 Austin Ambassador, major facelift and hatchback conversion of ADO71 (Princess) released in 1982.

There was also a short lived "AR" code following the renaming of BL Cars Ltd to Austin Rover in 1982. Most of the AR-designated projects were either abandoned or were renamed using the Rxx convention (see below)

- AR5 Proposed replacement for the Rover 213/216. Scheduled for a 1989 release, but was cancelled in favor of the AR8.
- AR6 Austin Metro replacement - was scaled back in scope and became the R6 Rover Metro program, launched in 1990.
- AR7 Proposed Austin Maestro facelift - scheduled for a 1990 release, but cancelled in 1985 in favor of the AR8.
- AR8 Proposed replacement for the Rover 214/216. Evolved into the R8 Rover 200-series in 1988.
- AR9 Austin Montego facelift. Launched in mid-1988. This was the only AR- designated project to make it into production.
- AR16 A reskinned Austin Montego with new exterior panels to continue the styling language of the Rover 800, along with a five-door hatchback variant designated as AR17. Planned for a 1988-1989 launch, but was abandoned in favor of the "Syncro" project - which became the Rover 600.

=== R codes & others used by the Rover Group ===
After British Leyland (now BL plc) was renamed Rover Group and its subsequent re-privatisation and sale to British Aerospace (and later, BMW), project codes in the 'Rxx format were generally used, although some projects were given alternative designations or sometimes names. Projects in this series were not numbered consecutively, unlike the earlier conventions. Some Rxx codes continued within the new MINI division of BMW after the 2000 break-up of the Rover Group, until MINI later switched to BMW's project numbering convention. The later RD code was used for projects undertaken by MG Rover from 2000 onward, to that company's collapse in 2005.

=== R and RD codes ===
- R3 Series III Rover 200/25 (1995–2005)
- R6 Rover Metro/100 (1990–1997) Was originally AR6, which would have been an all-new Metro replacement - R6 ended up becoming a major facelift and re-engineering of the original 1980 Austin Metro (ADO88/LC8)
- R6X Alternative styling proposal for R6.
- R7 Hatchback based on shortened R8 platform, styling taken from the R6X.
- R8 Series II Rover 200/400 (1989–1995) Was initially known as "YY" (after the original Rover 800's "XX" designator) and AR8.
- R9 Sedan based on the R8. Cancelled in favor of a Rover version of the Honda Concerto.
- R17 Rover 800 MkII hatchback (1992–1998)
- R18 Rover 800 MkII saloon
- R30 Rover 25/45 replacement. Proposed for a 2002-03 launch, but was abandoned following the sale and break-up of the Rover Group by BMW.
- R40 Rover 75 (1998–2005)
- R50 Mini Hatch - Several Rxx codes were carried over following the spin-off of Mini into BMW ownership.
- R52 Mini Convertible
- R53 Mini Cooper S
- R55 Mini Clubman
- R56 Mini Hatch second generation
- R57 Mini Convertible second generation
- R58 Coupe
- R59 Roadster
- R60 Mini Countryman
- R61 Mini Paceman
- RD60 (later RDX60) Mid-range saloon positioned below the Rover 75, but was abandoned following MG Rover's collapse in 2005.
- RD110 Rover CityRover (2003–2005)
- RDX60/RDX130 Rover 45/MG ZS replacement
- RDX30 Rover 25/MG ZR
- RDX20 Rover 45/MG ZS
- RDX10 Rover 75/MG ZT

=== Honda/Rover codes ===
- HD9 Five-door version of the Honda Ballade/Triumph Acclaim (1981), probably a Triumph-badged Honda Quintet. An Australian version was marketed as the Rover Quintet.
- HD14 Sub-Metro sized car, probably a version of the Honda City/Jazz
- HD17 Internal code for the Honda-Rover large car to replace the SD1-based LM15. Renamed XX in 1982.
- XX Rover 800 Mk.1 and Sterling (1986–1992), initially known as HD17. The corresponding Honda sister car, the Legend was designated "HX". LWB and CCV versions were developed but never produced. XX was known internally as "doublecross".
- YY Rover 214/216, renamed AR8 in 1986. The Honda version, the Concerto, was designated "HY"
- HH-R Rover 400/45 (1995–2005) Also known as "Theta" during its development
- SK1 Rover 600, Honda-engined version. Rover-engined versions were known as SK2.
- SK3 Proposed Metro replacement, developed by Honda specifically for Rover and would have had no Honda-badged model. Cancelled in favor of the R3.
- CB40 Land Rover Freelander (L314)

=== MG Rover codes ===
- X10: MG ZT (2001–2005)
- X11: MG ZT Tourer (2001–2005)
- X12: MG ZT V8 (2003–2005)
- X20: MG ZS (2001–2005)
- X30: MG ZR (2001–2005)
- X40: MG TF (2002–2005)
- X60: MG version of the RD60, based on the Rover 75
- X80: MG XPower SV (2003–2005)
- X120: MG Midget/Roadster/GT (2003–2005), a trio of sports cars based on the MG TF and to be sold in the US. Cancelled when MG Rover collapsed in 2005.

=== Project Phoenix and PR/PX codes ===
- F-16: MG F forerunner (1985–1989); front-engine, front-drive car styled by Gerry McGovern. This marks the beginning of the MG F, as its shape was used to form the body panels for the PR1, PR2 and PR3.
- PR1: MG F forerunner (1989–1990); first Phoenix prototype, built in steel by Motor Panels on a Maestro chassis with a front-mounted transverse 2.0L M16 engine.
- PR2: MG F forerunner (1989–1990); second Phoenix prototype, built by Reliant on a Scimitar SS1 chassis and powered by a front-mounted Rover 3.9L V8.
- PR3: MG F forerunner (1990); third Phoenix prototype, built by ADC and moved to a mid-engine design. This design was selected to be taken forward as the MG F.
- PR3/8300: 1991 styling development by ADC of the original PR3 as part of 'productionising' the design.
- PR4: MG RV8 (1993–1995)
- PR5/DR2: Parallel MG F proposal (1990): Designed by Roy Axe, it was larger than the other PR-series, but was similar to the PR2 with a front-mounted V8 and rear wheel drive. It could have been an Austin-Healey if the marque had been revived.
- PX1: Parallel MG F proposal (1991); revival of the PR1 project, based on the R17 Rover 800. Later became the Adventurer-1.
- PX2: Parallel MG F proposal (1991); PX1 on a shorter wheelbase and retro styling. Later became the Adventurer-2.

=== Project code names ===
- 100-inch station wagon: Range Rover (1970); The project also used the name VELAR for registering road going prototypes.
- Adder: MG RV8 (1992–1995); also known as PR4
- Bravo: late 1970s proposal to bring back the SD1 with new bodywork, in both four and five door versions. Abandoned in favor of Project XX.
- Core: early proposals for Rover 600 replacement, merged with Eric and Flagship to become Isis then RD1 and the Rover 75
- Eric: early proposals for Rover 800 Coupe (1993); only a fiberglass mockup
- Flagship: early plans to replace the Rover 800 (1993); only a fiberglass mockup
- Isis: Rover 75 (1998–2005)
- Jewel: Rover 200 to 25 facelift (1999)
- Oyster: Rover 400 to 45 facelift (1999)
- Pathfinder: An aborted recreational vehicle which would have carried Rover branding. This ultimately evolved into the CB40 project Land Rover Freelander
- Project Jay: Land Rover Discovery Series I (1989)
- P38A: Range Rover Mk2 (1994) Also known as "Pegasus" or simply P38.
- Synchro: Rover 600 (1993–1998)
- Theta: Alternative name for HH-R.
- Tex: Rover 400 Tourer
- Tomcat: Rover 200 Coupe
- Tracer: Rover 200 Convertible
- Topaz: Rover 100 Convertible
- Troy: Lamm Mini Convertible

From late 1993, Richard Woolley had already been working on three models to replace the 800 and 600. The first, called ‘Flagship’ (and nicknamed ‘Flashpig’) would replace the 800, the second, called ‘Eric’ was a replacement for the 800 Coupe and the third, called ‘Core’, would replace the 600. Basically, these new cars were conceived to evolve the look pioneered in the 600 – but move in a direction more suited to Rover's traditional styling cues.

== Other codes ==
The Australian division used YD codes from 1962 to identify their projects.
