= Wolseley 6/99 =

Wolseley 6/99 and 6/110
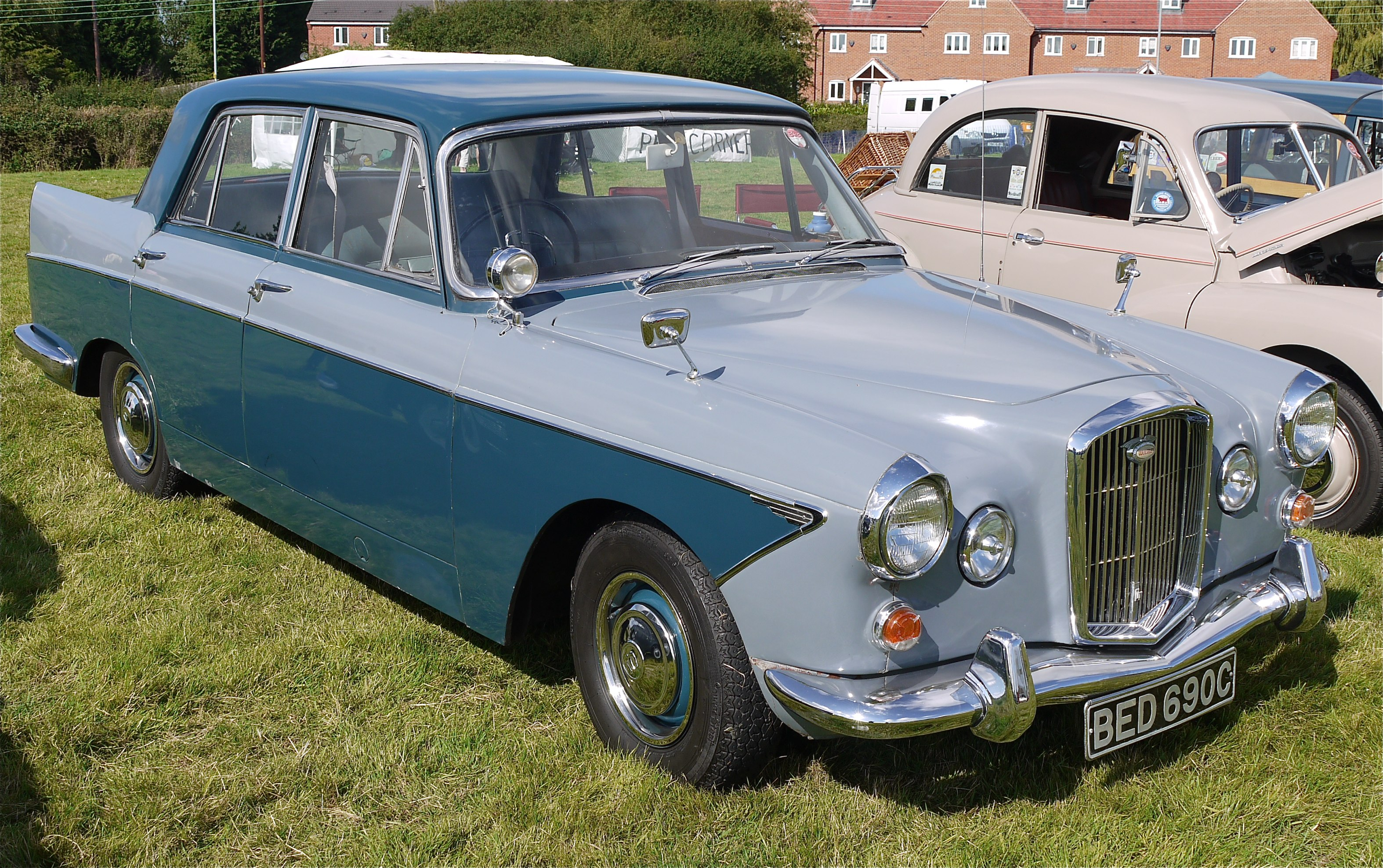
- Wolseley 6/110 (1965)

Overview
- Manufacturer: BMC
- Production: 1959–1968; 37,209 made
- Assembly: United Kingdom: Cowley, Oxfordshire, England

Body and chassis
- Class: Full-size car
- Body style: 4-door saloon
- Layout: FR layout
- Related: Austin Westminster; Vanden Plas Princess

Chronology
- Predecessor: Wolseley 6/90

The Wolseley 6/99 and 6/110 were the final large Wolseley cars. Styled by Pininfarina with additions by BMC staff stylists, the basic vehicle was also sold under two of BMC's other marques as the Austin A99 Westminster and Vanden Plas Princess 3-Litre. Production began in 1959 and the cars were updated and renamed for 1961. The Wolseley remained in production as the Wolseley 6/110 through to 1968.

The cars were also marketed in Denmark as the Wolseley 300.

There were two other Farina-designed car lines launched by BMC at the same time — the compact Austin A40 Farina and midsized Wolseley 15/60 and derivatives. Although similar looking, the latter shares no body parts and few other parts with the big Wolseley.

== Wolseley 6/99 ==
Wolseley 6/99
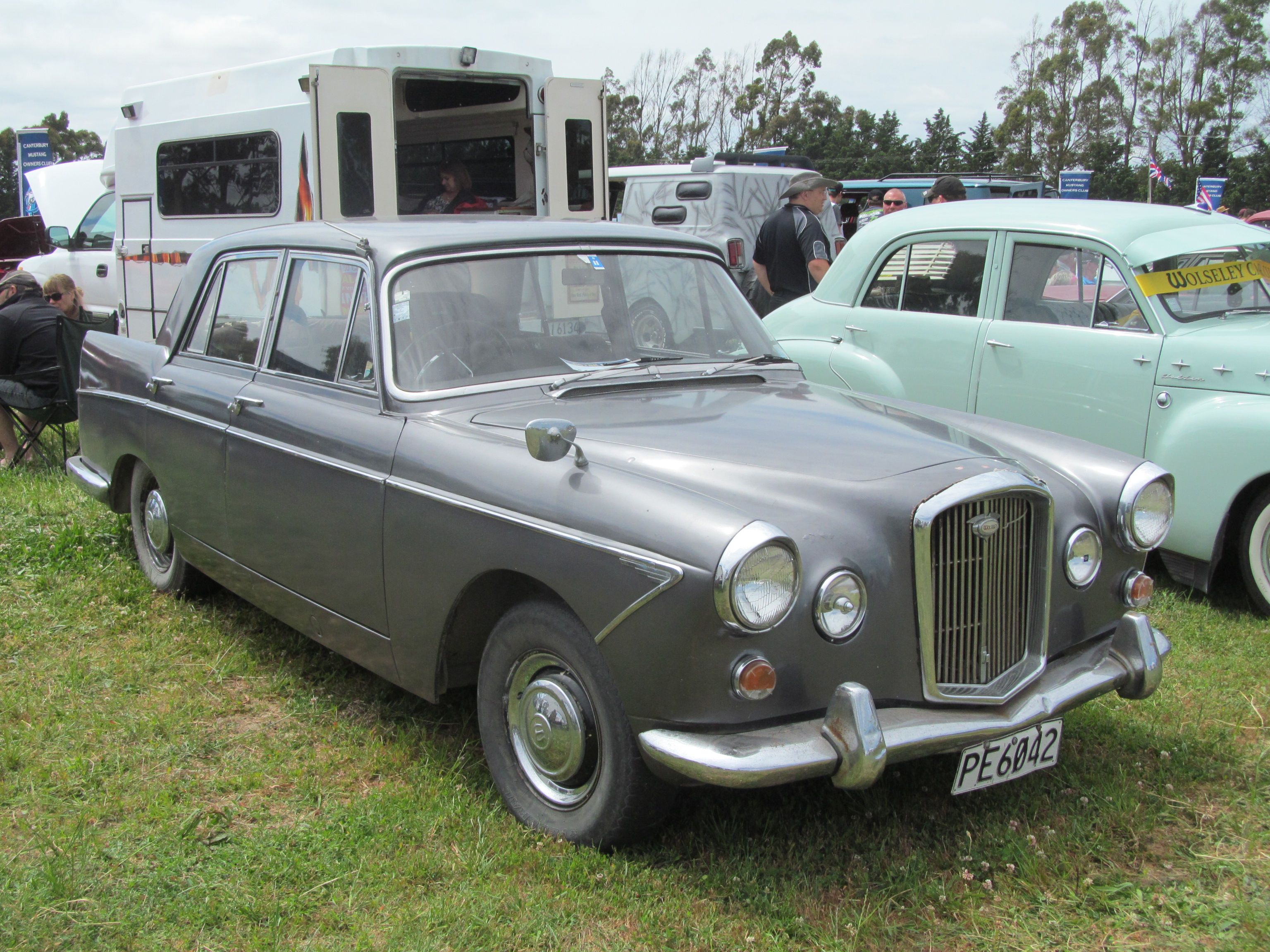
- Wolseley 6/99 (1961)

Overview
- Manufacturer: BMC
- Also called: Wolseley 300 (Denmark)
- Production: 1959–1961; 13,108 made

Powertrain
- Engine: 2.9 L C-Series I6
- Transmission: 3-speed manual Borg-Warner 3-speed automatic option

Dimensions
- Wheelbase: 108 in (2,700 mm)
- Length: 188 in (4,800 mm)
- Width: 68.5 in (1,740 mm)
- Height: 60 in (1,500 mm)

Chronology
- Predecessor: Wolseley 6/90 Series III
- Successor: Wolseley 6/110

The first generation of the large Farinas was introduced with the Austin A99 Westminster, with the Wolseley 6/99 following shortly after in 1959 to replace the 6/90. It used the same 2.9 L (2912 cc) C-Series straight-6, 102 bhp (76 kW), twin SU carburettor engine from the Austin-Healey 3000.

The suspension was the conventional BMC arrangement of coil springs and wishbones at the front with a live axle and semi elliptic leaf springs at the rear. An anti-roll bar was fitted at the front. Lockheed 10.75 in (273 mm) disc brakes were fitted at the front with 10 in (250 mm) drum brakes at the rear and vacuum servo assistance.

The interior was finished in luxurious style to distance the Wolseley from its Austin stablemate. The dashboard was polished wood as were the door cappings. Leather upholstery was used on the two front seats and rear bench seat which had a fold down central arm rest. A choice of single or duo-tone colour schemes was offered.

Wolseley 6/99s with left hand drive shipped to Canada used the 4-speed floor mounted shift with overdrive identical to that in the Austin-Healey 100/6 and 3000.

The Motor magazine tested a 6/99 with overdrive in 1959 and recorded a top speed of 97.6 mph (157.1 km/h) and acceleration from 0–60 mph (97 km/h) in 14.4 seconds. A "touring" fuel consumption of 23.6 mpg_{‑imp} (12.0 L/100 km; 19.7 mpg_{‑US}) was recorded. On the home market, as tested with overdrive, it cost £1254 including taxes of £369.

== Wolseley 6/110 ==
Wolseley 6/110
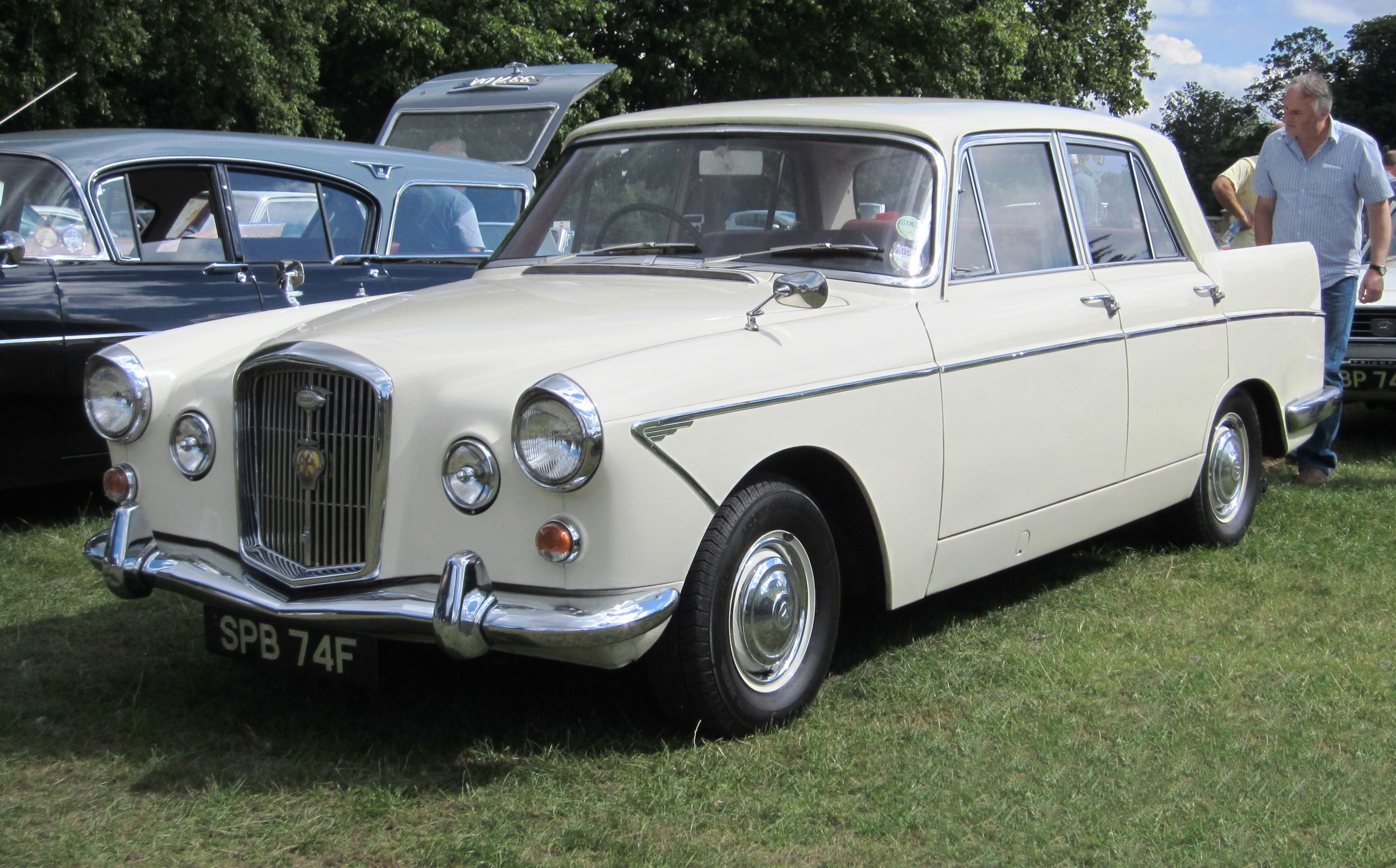
- Wolseley 6/110 Mk II

Overview
- Manufacturer: BMC
- Also called: Wolseley 300 (Denmark)
- Production: 1961–1968; 24,101 made

Powertrain
- Engine: 2.9 L C-Series I6
- Transmission: 3-speed manual, 4-speed on Mk II; Borg-Warner 3-speed automatic option

Dimensions
- Wheelbase: 110 in (2,800 mm)
- Length: 188 in (4,800 mm)
- Width: 68.5 in (1,740 mm)
- Height: 60 in (1,500 mm)

Chronology
- Predecessor: Wolseley 6/99
- Successor: none

The 6/99 was replaced by the Wolseley 6/110 in 1961. The wheelbase was increased by 2 inches (51 millimetres) and the seating slightly altered to give 3 inches more rear seat legroom compared to the 6/99. It used the same engine but now tuned to give 120 bhp (89 kW). For manual transmission cars, the gear lever was moved from the steering column to the floor. Hydrosteer variable ratio power steering and air conditioning were options from July 1962.

A Mark II model was released in 1964 with smaller 13-inch (330 mm) wheels and a 4-speed transmission, replacing the 3-speed unit, with overdrive available as an option. Production of the Mark II ended in March 1968. Only the Austin was replaced directly, with the unsuccessful Austin 3-Litre, which remained in production until 1971. Luxurious Wolseley and Vanden Plas versions of the 3-litre both reached prototype stage, but went no further.

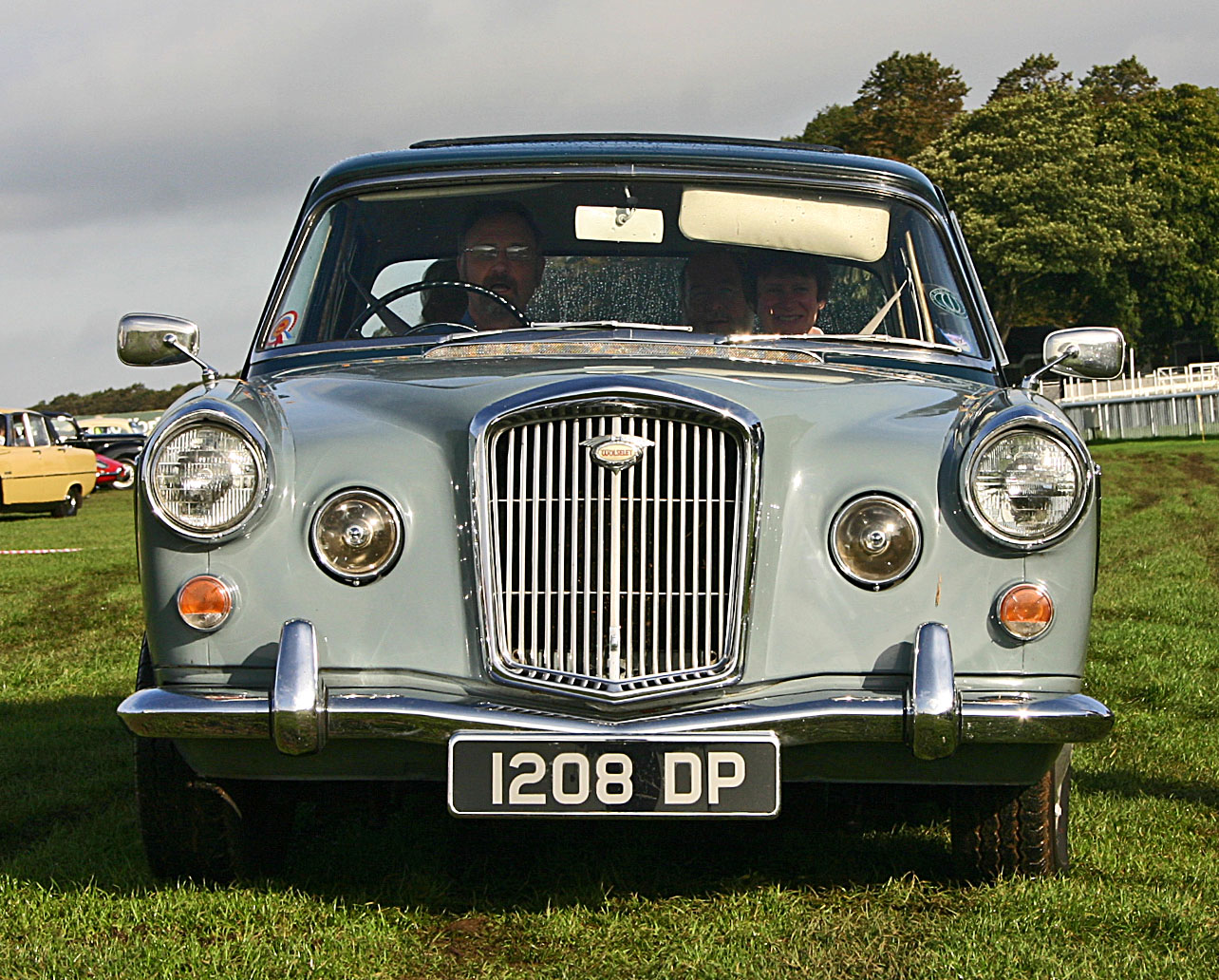
Wolseley 6/110 Mark II

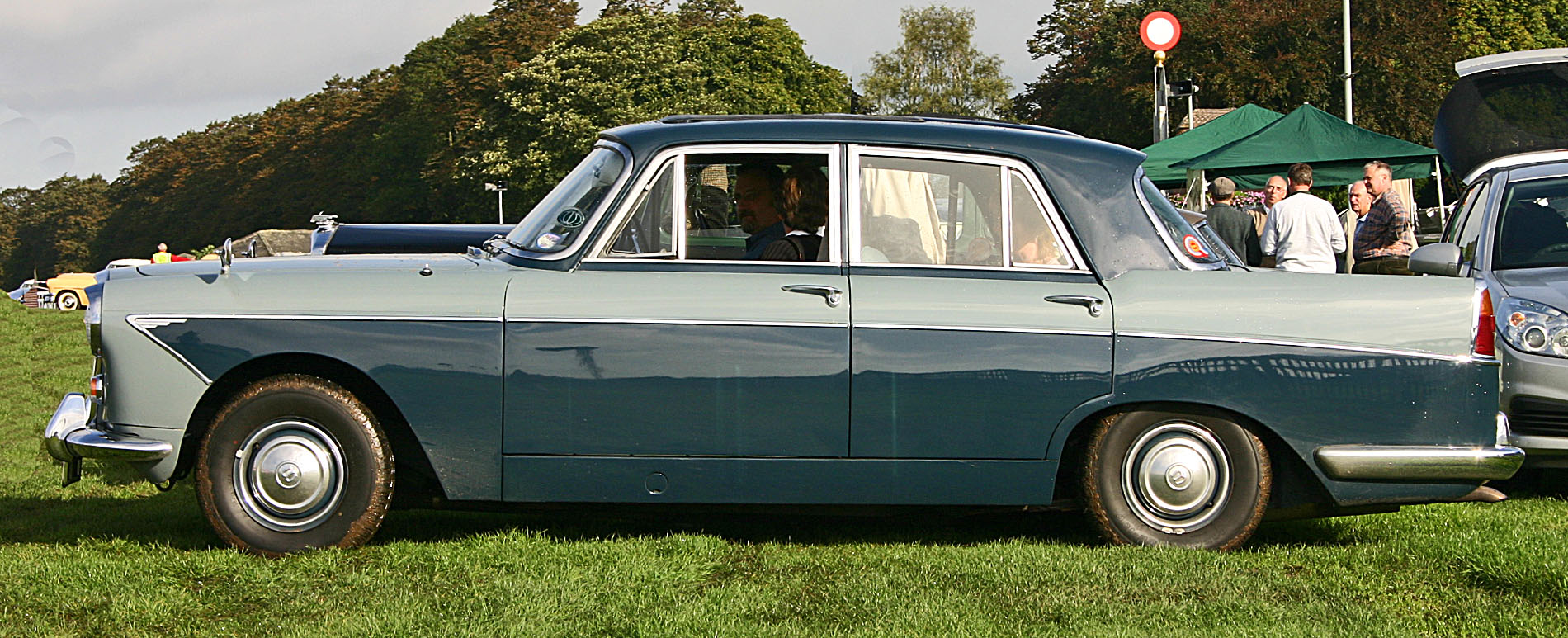

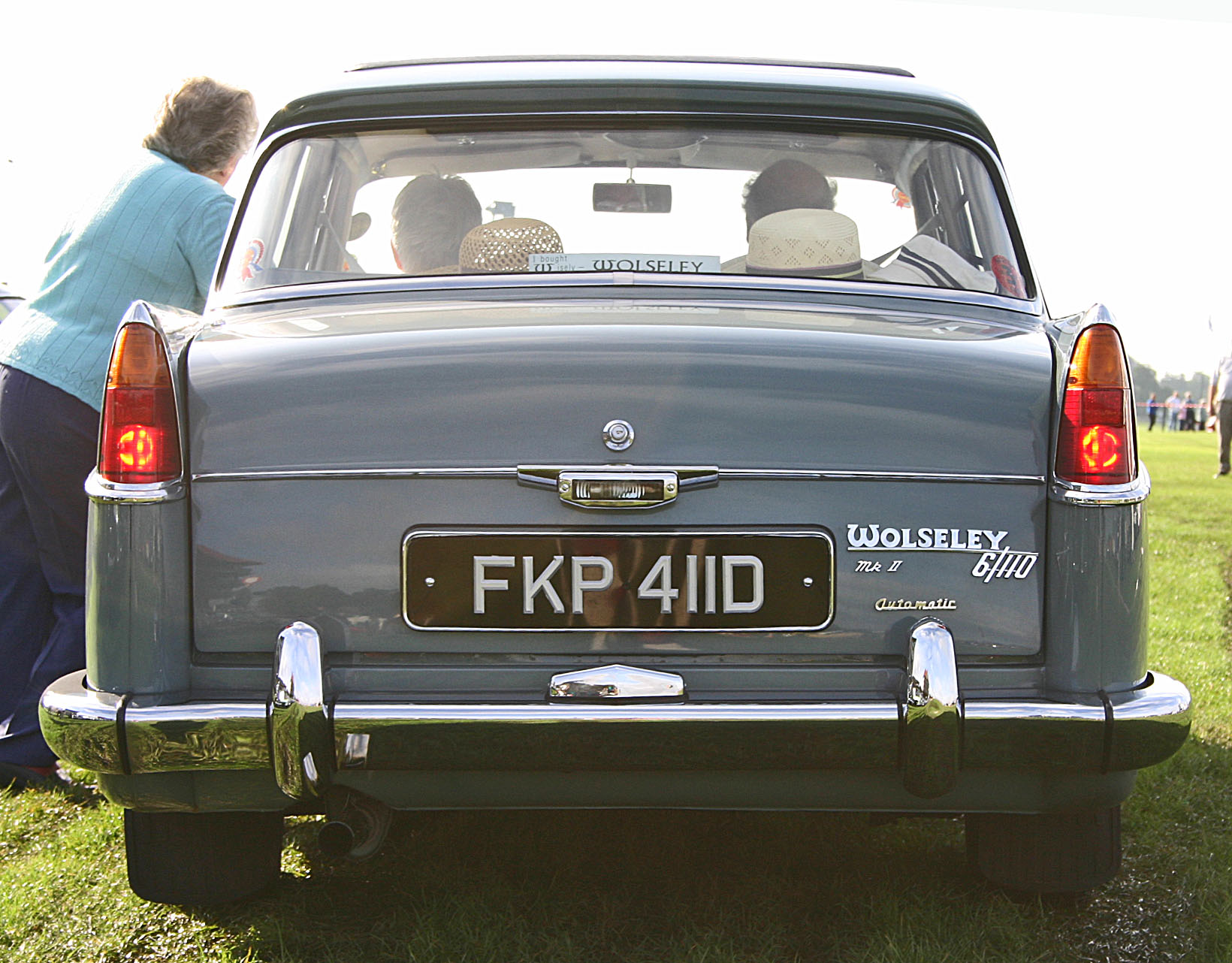

== Police use ==
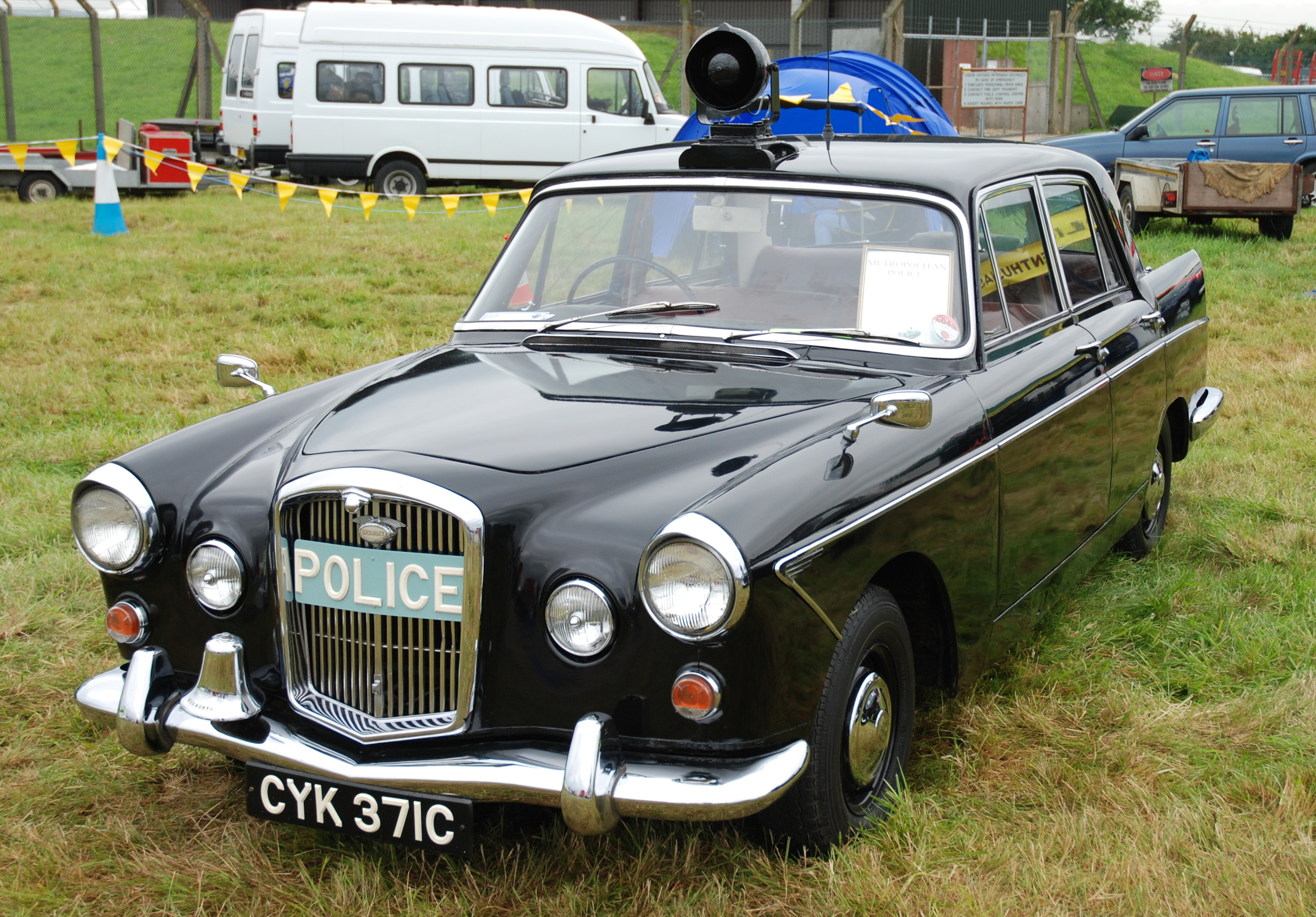
Wolseley 6/110 police car
