= Hydrosteer =

Hydrosteer was the name given by George Kent Ltd and Cam Gears Limited through Hydrosteer Limited of Luton, England, to its automotive power steering system. Initially Hydrosteer manufactured the Ross-Link system for commercial vehicles from 1953 under licence from Ross Gear and Tool of U.S.A. Their own product available from 1961 was based on a cam and peg system and was characterised by its fully integrated design and variable steering ratio. This configuration provided automotive manufacturers with a fairly simple design modification to provide a power steering option for cars fitted with a conventional cam and peg steering box. It was fitted to several, mainly British, luxury automobiles of the era. Production continued up to 1973, with just over 105,000 units being produced. As a "first generation" assistance system, applications were somewhat varied in their tuning of the many system dynamics to the specific vehicle. The system fell out of use as powered rack and pinion steering systems gained in popularity.

The 1960s Hydrosteer system should not be confused with Hydrosteer Pty Ltd, an Australian company established in 1981 as a provider of heavy truck steering technology in that country.

== Adoption ==
The Hydrosteer power steering system was fitted to the following cars:

Austin Westminster A110 (optional)
Facel Vega II (optional)
Humber Super Snipe Series V (optional)
Humber Imperial
Rover P5 3-Litre Mark 1a (optional)
Rover P5 3-Litre Mark 2 Saloon and Coupe
Rover P5 3-Litre Mark 3 Saloon and Coupe
Rover P5B 3.5-Litre Saloon and Coupe
Austin Princess DM4 Limousine(optional)
Vanden Plas Princess 3 Litre Mk II (optional)
Vanden Plas Princess 4-Litre R
Wolseley 6/110 (optional)

== Operation ==
The Hydrosteer system was based on a conventional cam-and-peg mechanism, except that the cam is surrounded by the skirt of a piston within the body of the steering box. Hydraulic power from the power steering pump is transmitted directly from the piston to the peg carrier. A spool type hydraulic valve moves along the axis of the cam in response to steering wheel movement, causing oil pressure to be applied to one side or other of the piston according to the direction the steering wheel is turned, and the load on the input and output shafts.

The cam track is not a regular helix but varies in pitch angle and depth. The variation in steering ratio between straight ahead and full lock results from the variance in pitch angle of the track. The more the steering wheel is turned, the lower the steering ratio becomes. In the Rover P5B, for example, the ratio of the power steering unit was 16:1 at the straight ahead and 11.3:1 at full lock.

The effect of the variable ratio is to give very light and relaxed steering at the straight ahead, with increased reaction when cornering. The system was designed to be fail-safe, so that the driver should still be able to steer in the event of a failure of the power system.

== Benefits and drawbacks ==
The major benefit of the Hydrosteer system is reduction in the amount of steering effort required of the driver, particularly at low road speeds or when a lot of turning is involved. Also, the Hydrosteer system was fully integrated into the steering box with no external jacks, giving it an advantage over earlier systems with external jacks, which needed more space and were heavier.

Whilst advanced for its time, the Hydrosteer system did have certain drawbacks, in common with all variable ratio steering systems of the era. It was more complicated and expensive than a constant ratio power assisted system. The Hydrosteer system was also criticised for feeling far too light under most circumstances. An article in Car magazine in January 1968 on the Rover P5B was particularly scathing about the lightness and lack of feel of Hydrosteer steering. Similar criticism appeared in other contemporary road test articles on the Rover and Vanden Plas 4-Litre R. Much of the blame for this may lie with the cars' manufacturers, who would have instructed Hydrosteer what to supply in terms of number of turns lock-to-lock and degree of power assistance.

Use of the Hydrosteer system in cars effectively died out with the generation of 1960s models to which it was fitted. For example, the Rover P6B 3500S that followed the Rover P5B used the Marles Varamatic variable ratio system, which was slightly heavier in most circumstances than the Rover P5 system and arguably had more road feel, although that system too failed to survive much beyond the 1970s.
