= A-Do (manga) =

Japanese manga series

- First tankōbon volume cover

亜童 (Adō)
- Genre: Action; Science fiction
- Manga
- Written by: Jaku Amano
- Published by: Kodansha
- English publisher: NA: Kodansha USA
- Imprint: Young Magazine KC
- Magazine: Monthly Young Magazine
- Original run: May 21, 2019 – present
- Volumes: 12

A-Do (Japanese: 亜童, Hepburn: Adō) is a Japanese manga series written and illustrated by Jaku Amano. It began serialization in Kodansha's Monthly Young Magazine in May 2019, and has been compiled into twelve volumes as of July 2026.

== Plot ==
The series takes place in a futuristic Japan where, following immigration reforms 25 years prior, tensions are rising between the local population and immigrants. Riko Saeki encounters a boy named Eito after saving him from being hit by a truck. When the two are suddenly attacked while eating at a restaurant, Eito reveals that he can turn parts of his body into a plant-like form. Riko finds herself becoming involved in a government conspiracy, with Eito being one of its targets.

== Characters ==
Riko Saeki (冴木 リコ, Saeki Riko)
A 19-year-old gyaru who travels around in a moped, having left home when she was 15. She is not on good terms with her family, as her mother had joined a cult and had total control over her life. She works part-time at a convenience store, but is habitually late and is thinking of getting a new job. She is a smoker.
Eito (エイト)
A young boy that Riko saved from a traffic accident. When they go to the police station, the police could not find any information about his background other than his name.

== Publication ==
A-Do is written and illustrated by Jaku Amano. It began serialization in Kodansha's Monthly Young Magazine on May 21, 2019, and is set to end on November 18, 2026. The series has been compiled into twelve tankōbon volumes as of July 2026. The series is licensed in English by Kodansha USA.

| No. | Original release date | Original ISBN | North American release date | North American ISBN |
|---|---|---|---|---|
| 1 | February 6, 2020 | 978-4-06-518494-3 | March 5, 2024 | 978-1-64651-931-6 |
| 2 | October 6, 2020 | 978-4-06-520994-3 | May 7, 2024 | 978-1-64651-932-3 |
| 3 | April 6, 2020 | 978-4-06-522930-9 | July 2, 2024 | 978-1-64651-933-0 |
| 4 | October 20, 2021 | 978-4-06-525084-6 | September 3, 2024 | 978-1-64651-934-7 |
| 5 | April 20, 2022 | 978-4-06-527471-2 | November 5, 2024 | 978-1-64651-935-4 |
| 6 | October 20, 2022 | 978-4-06-529475-8 | January 7, 2025 | 978-1-64651-940-8 |
| 7 | May 18, 2023 | 978-4-06-531707-5 | March 4, 2025 | 979-8-88877-212-6 |
| 8 | October 19, 2023 | 978-4-06-533390-7 | August 5, 2025 | 979-8-88877-314-7 |
| 9 | May 20, 2024 | 978-4-06-535628-9 | February 3, 2026 | 979-8-88877-417-5 |
| 10 | November 20, 2024 | 978-4-06-537518-1 | — | — |
| 11 | July 18, 2025 | 978-4-06-540197-2 | — | — |
| 12 | July 17, 2026 | 978-4-06-544255-5 | — | — |
