= Ado's theorem =

Theorem in abstract algebra

In abstract algebra, Ado's theorem is a theorem characterizing finite-dimensional Lie algebras.

== Statement ==
Ado's theorem states that every finite-dimensional Lie algebra L over a field K of characteristic zero can be viewed as a Lie algebra of square matrices under the commutator bracket. More precisely, the theorem states that L has a linear representation ρ over K, on a finite-dimensional vector space V, that is a faithful representation, making L isomorphic to a subalgebra of the endomorphisms of V.

== History ==
The theorem was proved in 1935 by Igor Dmitrievich Ado of Kazan State University, a student of Nikolai Chebotaryov.

The restriction on the characteristic was later removed by Kenkichi Iwasawa (see also the below Gerhard Hochschild paper for a proof).

== Implications ==
While for the Lie algebras associated to classical groups there is nothing new in this, the general case is a deeper result. Applied to the real Lie algebra of a Lie group G, it does not imply that G has a faithful linear representation (which is not true in general), but rather that G always has a linear representation that is a local isomorphism with a linear group.
