= Ado (film) =

2025 film by Sam Henderson

- Directed by: Sam Henderson
- Written by: Sam Henderson; Ryan Romine
- Produced by: Sam Henderson; Rachel Jobin; Ryan Romine
- Starring: Jenifer Lewis
- Cinematography: Eric Branco
- Edited by: Maverick Moore
- Release date: 2025
- Running time: 15 minutes
- Country: United States
- Language: English

Ado is an American short film co-written and directed by Sam Henderson. It follows a middle school theatre teacher whose rehearsal is disrupted by a school shooting. It was shortlisted for the Best Live Action Short Film at the 98th Academy Awards.

== Plot ==
The film centers on Ms. Hopkins, a middle school theatre teacher whose rehearsal of Much Ado About Nothing with her students is abruptly disrupted by a school shooting.

== Cast ==
- Jenifer Lewis as Ms. Hopkins
- Zach Lane as Bradley Taylor
- Karis Henderson as Maddie
- Lucas Krystek as Kenneth
- Jacob Estrada as Kid Cast
- Harvey B. Jackson as LAPD Ofc. B. Leasure
- Jayshawn Leake as Kid Cast
- Anna Scales as Kid Cast
- Norman Sieger as SWAT Officer
- DeAnna Toten Beard as Principal
- Jaxon Thomas Williams as Kid Cast

== Release ==
Ado had its world premiere at the 2025 Flickerfest in January.

In April 2025, it won Best Student Short Audience Choice Award at Cleveland International Film Festival.

In June 2025, it won the HBO Short Film Award Showcase at the American Black Film Festival, presented by HBO and Warner Bros. Discovery, receiving a $10,000 cash prize.

In August 2025, it screened at HollyShorts Film Festival.
