= Igor Dmitrievich Ado =

Russian mathematician

Igor Dmitrievich Ado (Russian: Игорь Дмитриевич Адо, scientific transliteration Igor' Dmitrievič Ado; January 17, 1910 in Kazan – June 30, 1983) was a Soviet mathematician. He was born into the family of a state employee and he lived in Kazan till the end of his life. After leaving school he entered the faculty of mathematics and physics at Kazan State University, named after V. I. Lenin, from which he graduated in 1931. He was admitted to the PhD study at the Chair of Mathematics (since 1934 – Chair of Algebra) under the supervision of Nikolai Chebotaryov. Igor Ado finished his PhD study by preparing a scientific qualifying work for the degree of a Candidate (PhD) of physical and mathematical sciences. The University board awarded him for this work the degree of Doctor nauk (doctor of sciences) of physic-mathematical sciences. This is an analogue to the European Habilitation and is very unusual to receive for a PhD work.

Igor Ado solved in his thesis a current problem of modern abstract algebra connected to representation theory of Lie algebras and Lie groups. More precisely, he obtained the result which is now known as Ado's Theorem: every finite-dimensional Lie algebra over a field of characteristic zero has a faithful finite-dimensional linear representation.

After the defense of his doctoral thesis Igor Ado started to work at Kazan State University. From 1936 till 1942 he held the position of professor at the Chair of Algebra. In 1942 Igor Ado moved to the Kazan State Chemical Technological Institute named after S.M. Kirov, now called Kazan National Research Technological University where he held the Chair of High Mathematics until his death. He held the position of professor from 1942 to 1958 and from 1970 to 1983. During the period from 1958 to 1970 he was the head of the chair.

Igor Ado has 12 publications. He did research in group theory and representation theory. His most famous publication is the paper The representation of Lie algebras by matrices. Ado's Theorem has attracted the attention of many famous mathematicians who tried to improve its proof. Kenkichi Iwasawa proved the theorem over a field of prime characteristic. For this reason Ado's Theorem is also called Ado-Iwasawa Theorem. Many generalizations and refinements of Ado's Theorem have been considered.
