= Vanden Plas Princess =

The Princess is a badge engineered variant of the Austin A99 Westminster, manufactured by BMC from 1959 to 1968 and marketed under the Vanden Plas marque.

The model was launched in October 1959 under the name Princess 3-litre. From July 1960, these vehicles bore the name Vanden Plas Princess 3-litre, Vanden Plas having become a badge-engineered brand in its own right instead of being known as a coachbuilder for cars of other manufacturers. The 3-litre was superseded by the Vanden Plas Princess 4-litre R in 1964.

The Princess was a great deal smaller and less than 44 per cent of the price of the older Princess IV Saloon, which was also to continue until 1968.

== Princess 3-litre ==
Princess 3-litre (1959–1960) Vanden Plas Princess 3-litre (1960–1964)
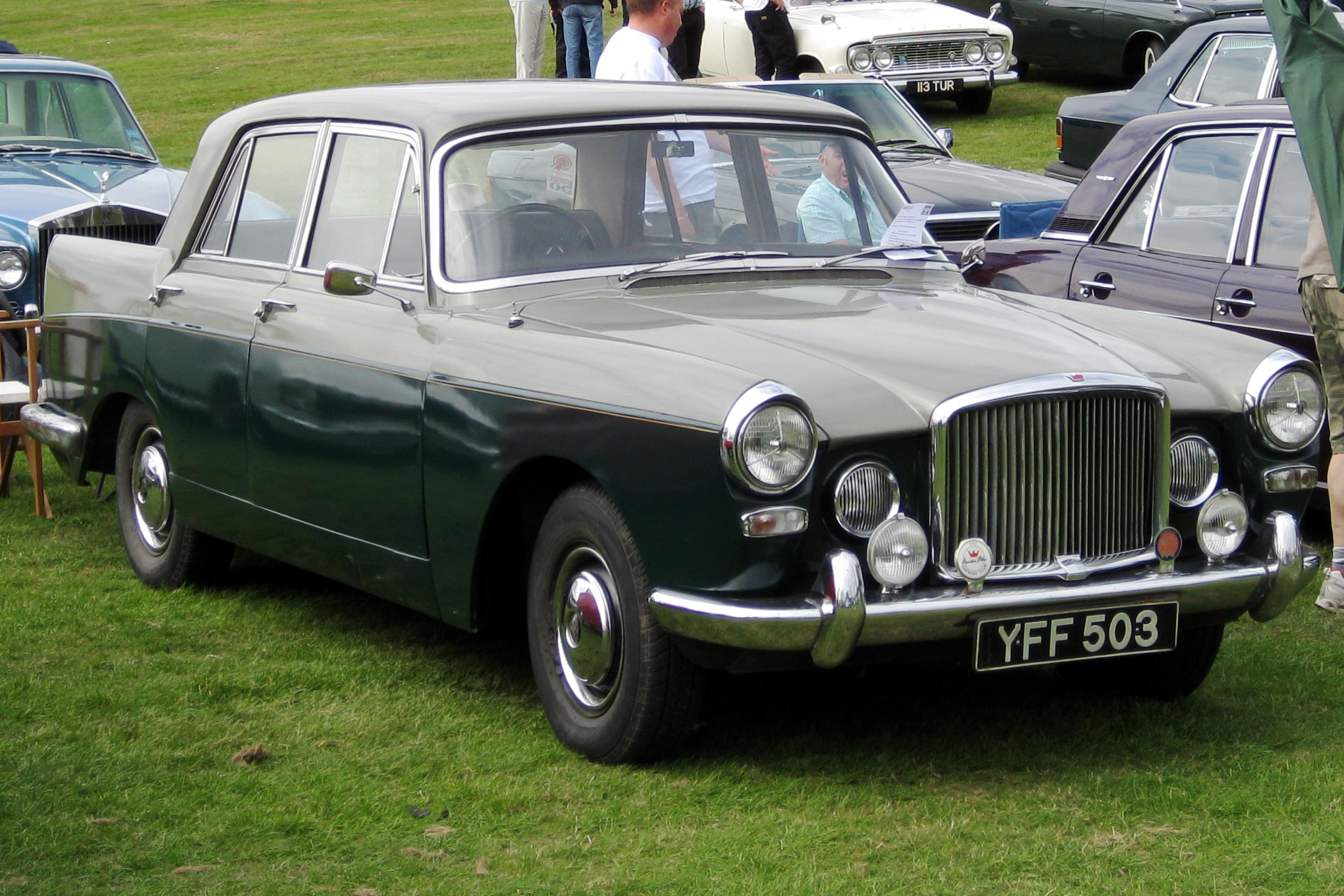
- 1961 Vanden Plas Princess 3-litre

Overview
- Manufacturer: BMC
- Also called: Austin Princess 3-litre (Australia)
- Production: 1959–1964
- Assembly: United Kingdom: Kingsbury
- Designer: Pininfarina

Body and chassis
- Class: Full-size car
- Body style: 4-door saloon
- Layout: FR layout
- Related: Austin Westminster; Wolseley 6/99

Powertrain
- Engine: 2.9 L C-Series I6

Dimensions
- Wheelbase: 1959–1961: 84 in (2,134 mm); 1961–1964: 86 in (2,184 mm)
- Length: 187.75 in (4,769 mm)
- Width: 68.5 in (1,740 mm)
- Height: 59 in (1,499 mm)

Chronology
- Predecessor: Austin A105 Vanden Plas
- Successor: Vanden Plas Princess 4-litre R

The 3-litre was largely identical to the Pininfarina-designed Austin A99 Westminster and Wolseley 6/99 which used the same chassis and body. The Princess was given its own identity with a special Vanden Plas grille (fairly square, with a thick surround and vertical slats), round headlamps, and horn grilles on the front. The interior was lavish in typical Vanden Plas style, featuring burr walnut wood trim, leather seats and panels, and high-quality carpeting. A division between the driver and the rear compartment was an optional extra. Initially, it was powered by BMC's 3-litre C-Series engine, developing 108 hp (81 kW).

A Vanden Plas Princess 3-litre with automatic transmission was tested by the British magazine The Motor in 1961 and had a top speed of 99.3 mph (159.8 km/h). It could accelerate from 0-60 mph (97 km/h) in 16.1 seconds while fuel consumption of 21.1 miles per imperial gallon (13.4 L/100 km; 17.6 mpg_{‑US}) was recorded. The test car cost £1,467 including taxes.

This model was replaced in 1961 by the Vanden Plas Princess 3-litre Mark II. Styling was similar but the wheelbase was two inches (5 cm) longer and anti-roll bars were added to the suspension at both ends of the car. The engine was uprated to 120 hp (89 kW). Better brakes were fitted, and interior improvements included built-in drop-down "picnic tables" for the rear seat passengers. Options now included "Smith's air-conditioning".

=== Engine specifications ===
Engine
Years	Engine	Model	Power	Torque	Top Speed	0-60 mph	Transmission	Economy
1959–1961	2,912 cc OHV I6	BMC C-series	103 hp (77 kW) at 4750 rpm	157 lb⋅ft (213 N⋅m) at 2300 rpm	97 mph (156 km/h)	17.9 s	3-speed manual, overdrive on top 2 gears 3-speed automatic	17.0 mpg_{‑imp} (16.6 L/100 km)
1961–1964	2,912 cc OHV I6	BMC C-series	120 hp (89 kW) at 4750 rpm	163 lb⋅ft (221 N⋅m) at 2750 rpm	105 mph (169 km/h)	16.9 s	3-speed manual, overdrive on top 2 gears 3-speed automatic	18.0 mpg_{‑imp} (15.7 L/100 km)

This model was discontinued in 1964 and replaced by a new Rolls-Royce powered model.

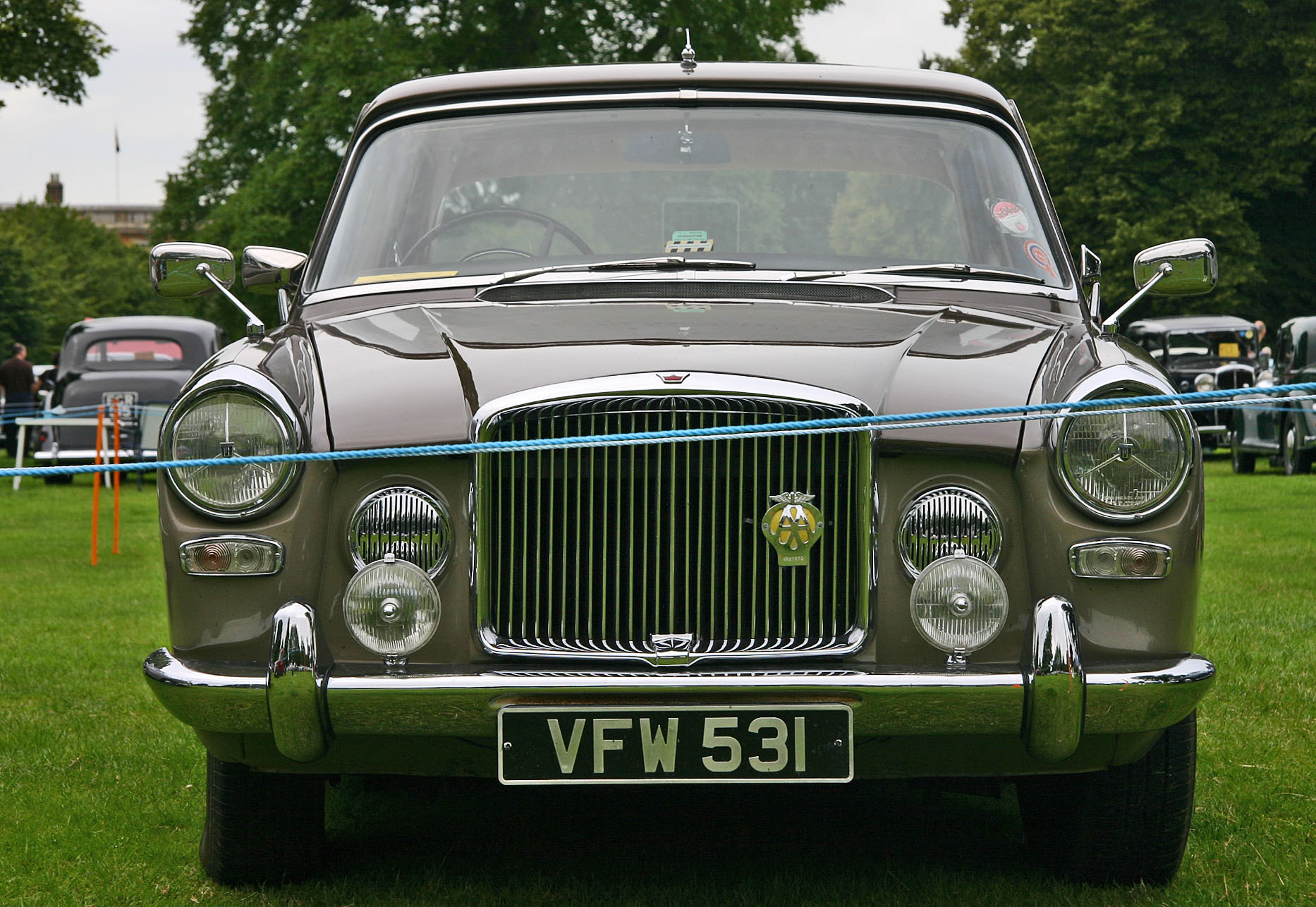
Vanden Plas Princess 3-litre Mark II

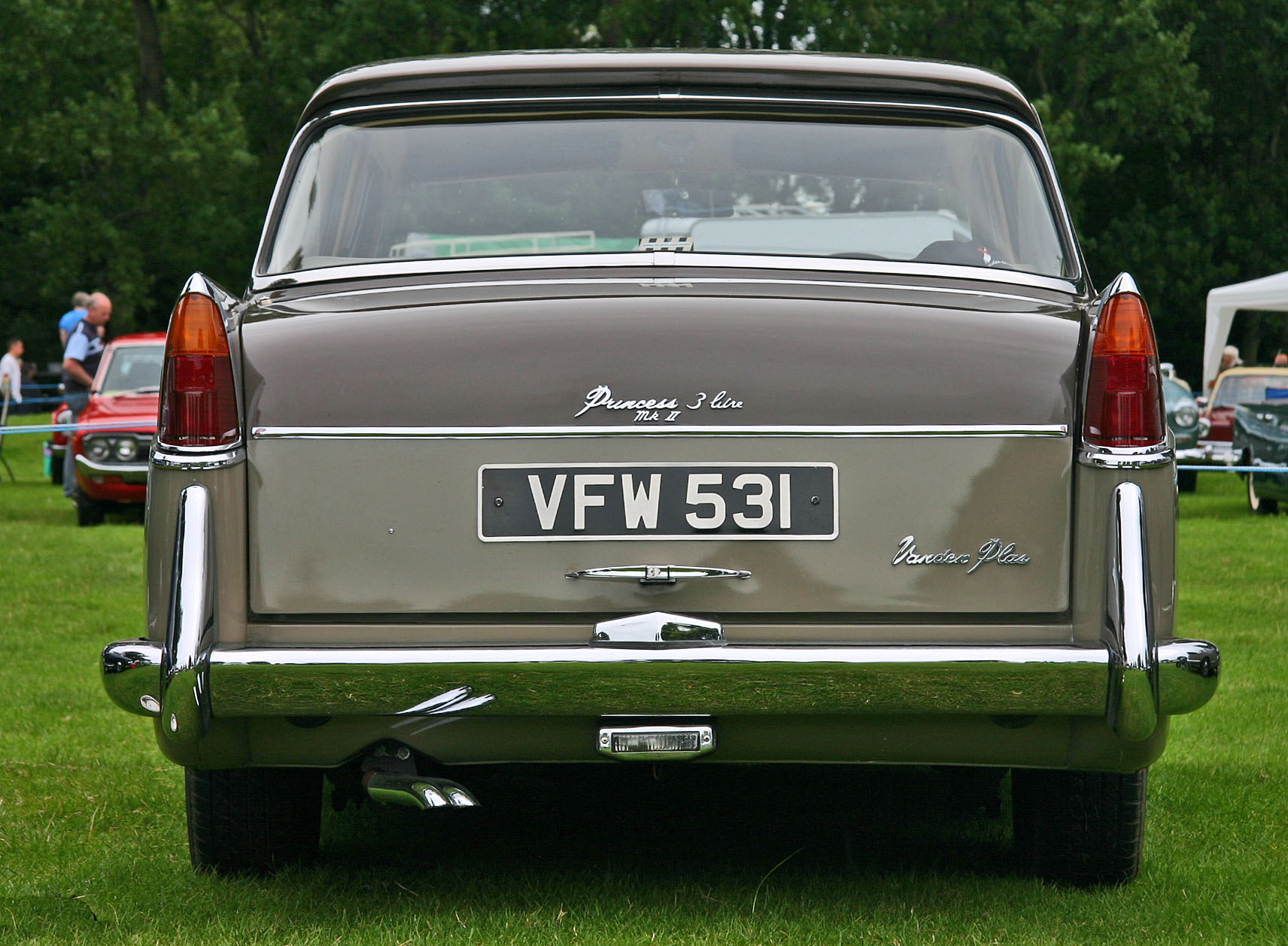
Vanden Plas Princess 3-litre Mark II

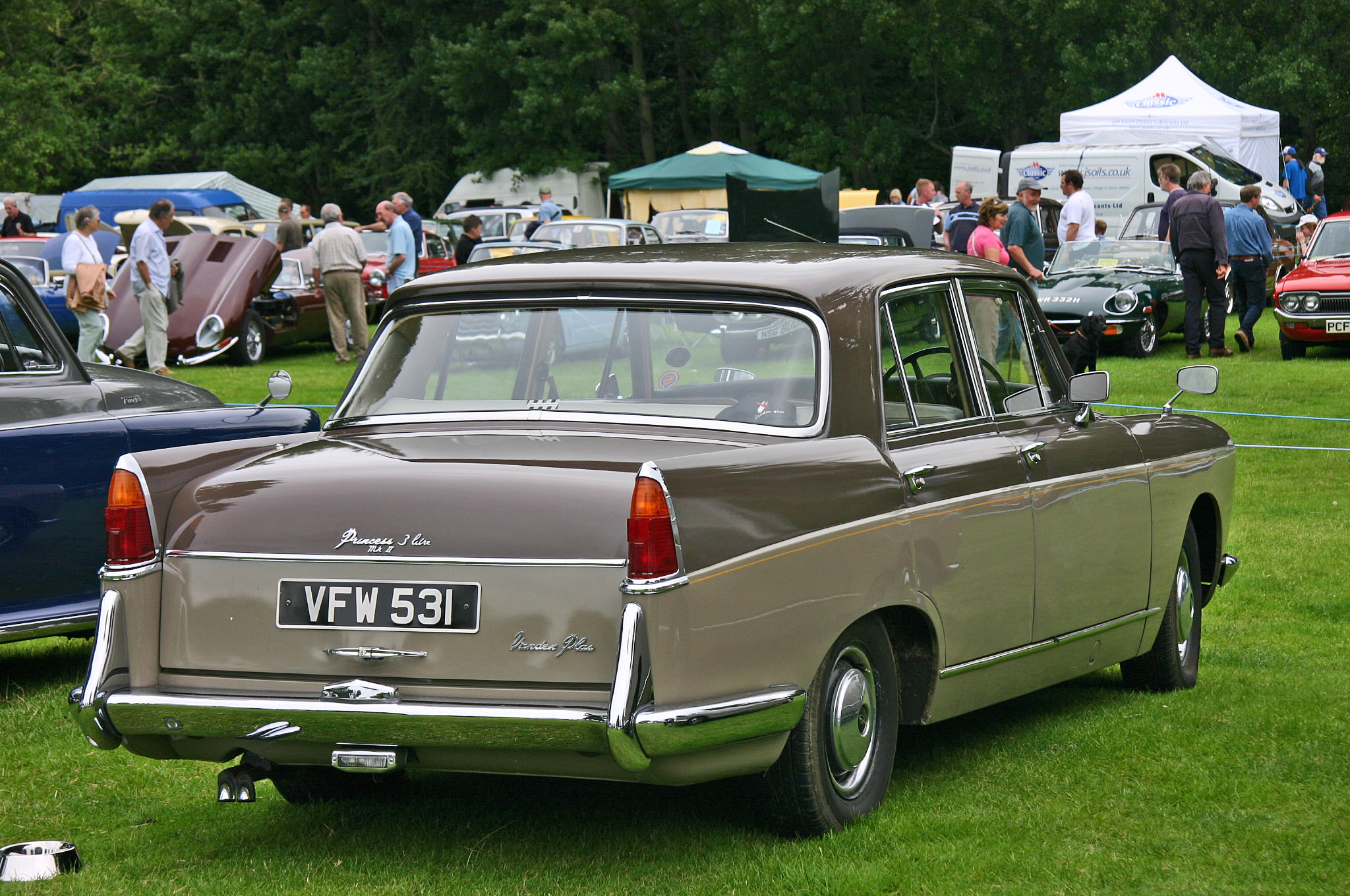
Vanden Plas Princess 3-litre Mark II

== Vanden Plas Princess R ==
Vanden Plas Princess R (1964–1968)
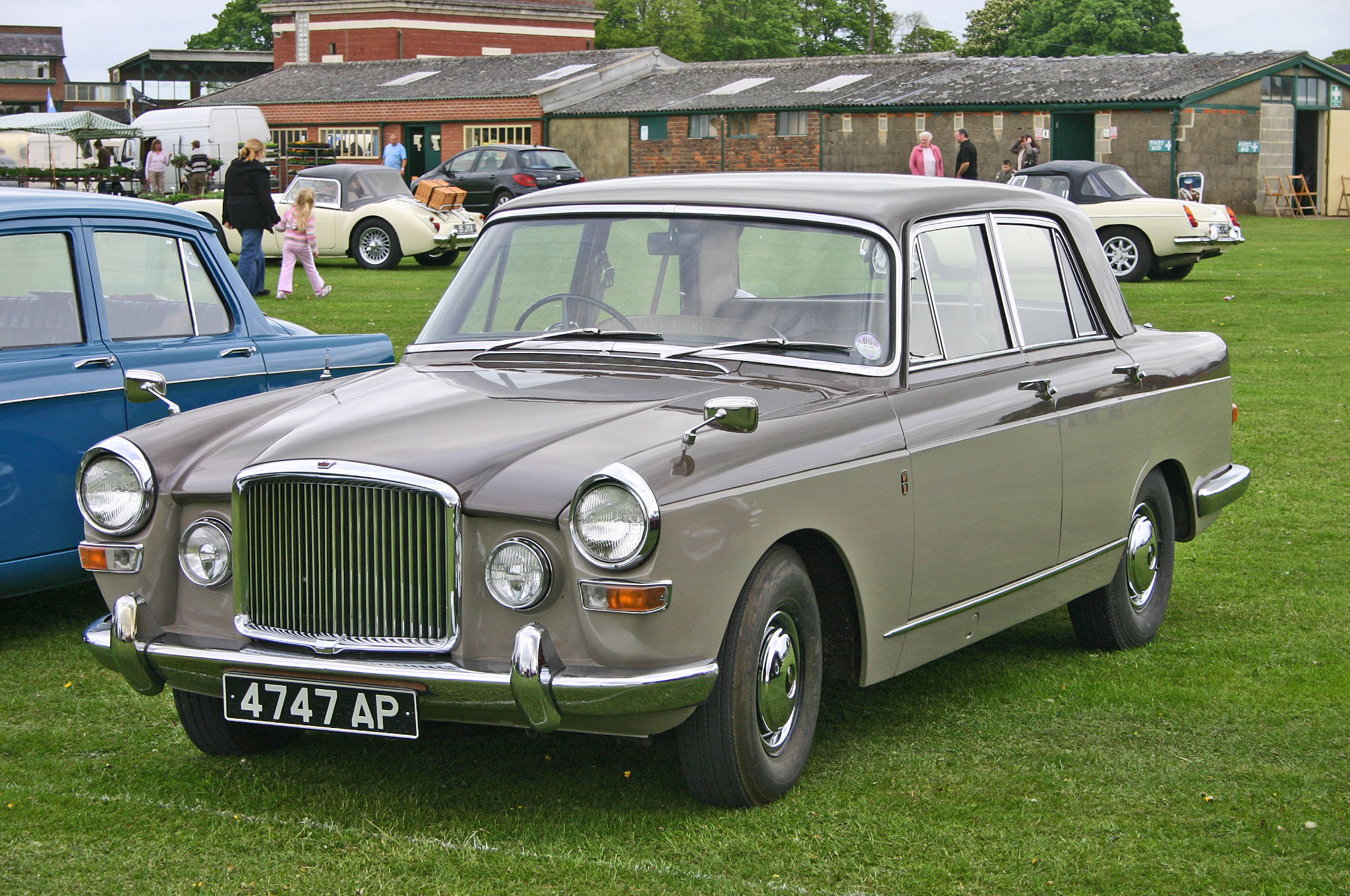
- 1967 Vanden Plas Princess 4-litre R

Overview
- Manufacturer: BMC
- Production: 1964–1968
- Assembly: United Kingdom: Kingsbury; South Africa: Cape Town
- Designer: Pininfarina

Body and chassis
- Class: Full-size car
- Body style: 4-door saloon
- Layout: FR layout
- Related: Austin Westminster; Wolseley 6/110

Powertrain
- Engine: 3.9 L Rolls-Royce IOE I6

Dimensions
- Wheelbase: 86 in (2,184 mm)
- Length: 187.75 in (4,769 mm)
- Width: 68.5 in (1,740 mm)
- Height: 59 in (1,499 mm)

Chronology
- Predecessor: Vanden Plas Princess 3-litre
- Successor: None

The Vanden Plas Princess R with its Rolls-Royce all-aluminium 175 bhp engine was announced in August 1964. With an unusually high power to weight ratio the car gave easy cruising at 90+ mph and was capable of 112 mph.

In addition to exterior alterations, the R featured an 6 cylinder aluminium Rolls-Royce FB60 engine, a short-stroke version of the B series engine: 4, 6 and 8 cylinder units of which more than 30,000 had already been produced. The 6-cylinder engine weighed only 450 lb (204 kg). The engine resulted from more than two years technical collaboration between BMC and Rolls-Royce, and featured a cubic capacity of 3.909 litres (239 cu in). Over-square: bore was 95.25 mm (3.8 in), stroke 91.44 mm (3.6 in); with a 7.8:1 compression ratio its output was 175 bhp (130 kW; 177 PS) @4,800 rpm. Twin SU carburettors were fitted. Both block and head were aluminium, tappets were hydraulic self-adjusting operating on overhead inlet and side exhaust valves. The counterbalanced crankshaft ran in seven bearings.

The 4-litre R featured polished walnut fascia padded top and bottom, leather upholstered seats with fully reclinable backs and deployable polished picnic tables for the rear passengers. A new automatic transmission was provided, Borg-Warner model 8, its first use in a British car and Hydrosteer variable ratio power steering accompanied wider tyres. Externally the fog lamps were moved up by the grille, and rear tailfins were replaced with small corner-ridges.

=== Engine specifications ===
Engine
Years	Manufacturer	Model	Engine	Power	Torque	Top Speed	0-60 mph	Economy
1964–1968	Rolls-Royce IOE	3.9 Automatic	3,909 cc - L6 - NA	177 PS (130 kW)	296 N⋅m (218 lb⋅ft)	112 mph (180 km/h)	12.7 s	15.0 mpg_{‑imp} (18.8 L/100 km)

=== Pricing ===
The background to the pricing was that from April 1961 tax relief on company cars was allowed only up to £2,000.

The new car was priced on a par with the Jaguar Mark X (albeit only the manual transmission model of the Jaguar) and 50 per cent more than its apparent predecessor the 3-litre car. It was a major change of market positioning aimed at the growing prestige and executive market in Europe and the United States. However, its close appearance to its predecessor and its pricing (near to that of the Jaguar, which was bigger with a far more advanced chassis design and more prestigious, though itself without a useful market in the United States), resulted in slow sales.

- £1,346 (discontinued Vanden Plas Princess Mark II)
- £1,994 Vanden Plas Princess 4-litre R
- £2,022 Jaguar Mark X
- £5,517 Rolls-Royce Silver Cloud III

=== Production ===
Joint production aimed at 12,000 annually, though actual production was never more than a fraction of this. Final assembly and hand finishing took place at the Vanden Plas works in Kingsbury London.

The Vanden Plas Princess 4-litre R remained in production until 1968, just ahead of BMC's merge into British Leyland. 6,687 vehicles were produced at Kingsbury and an additional 312 C.K.D. kits were exported to South Africa bringing total production to 6,999 units. It was the only mass-produced civilian vehicle from another manufacturer ever to use a Rolls-Royce engine.

The late Queen Elizabeth ll owned an estate model of the Vanden Plas Princess, with an estimated production of 4-7.

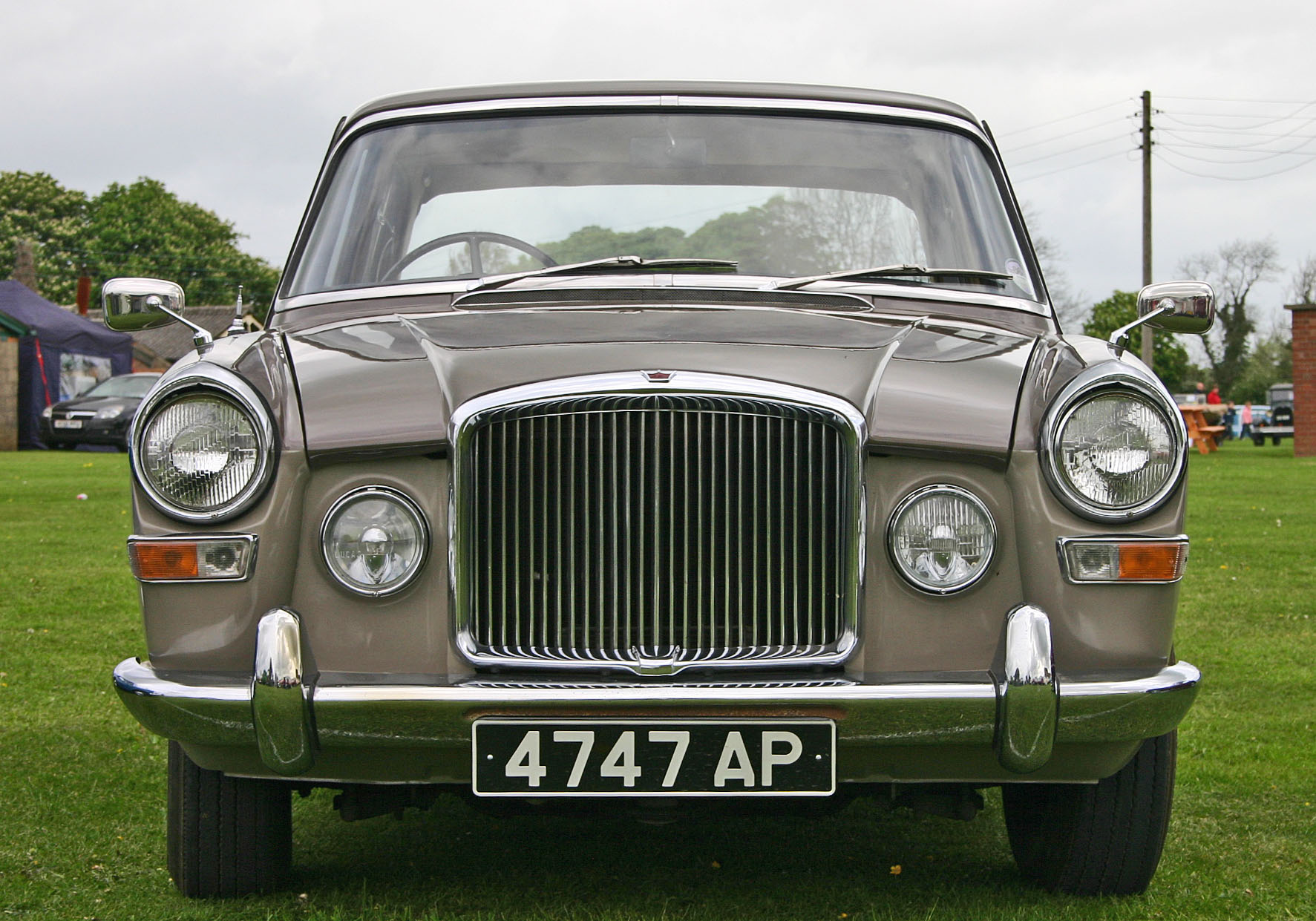
Front view showing newly positioned fog lamps and wider tyres

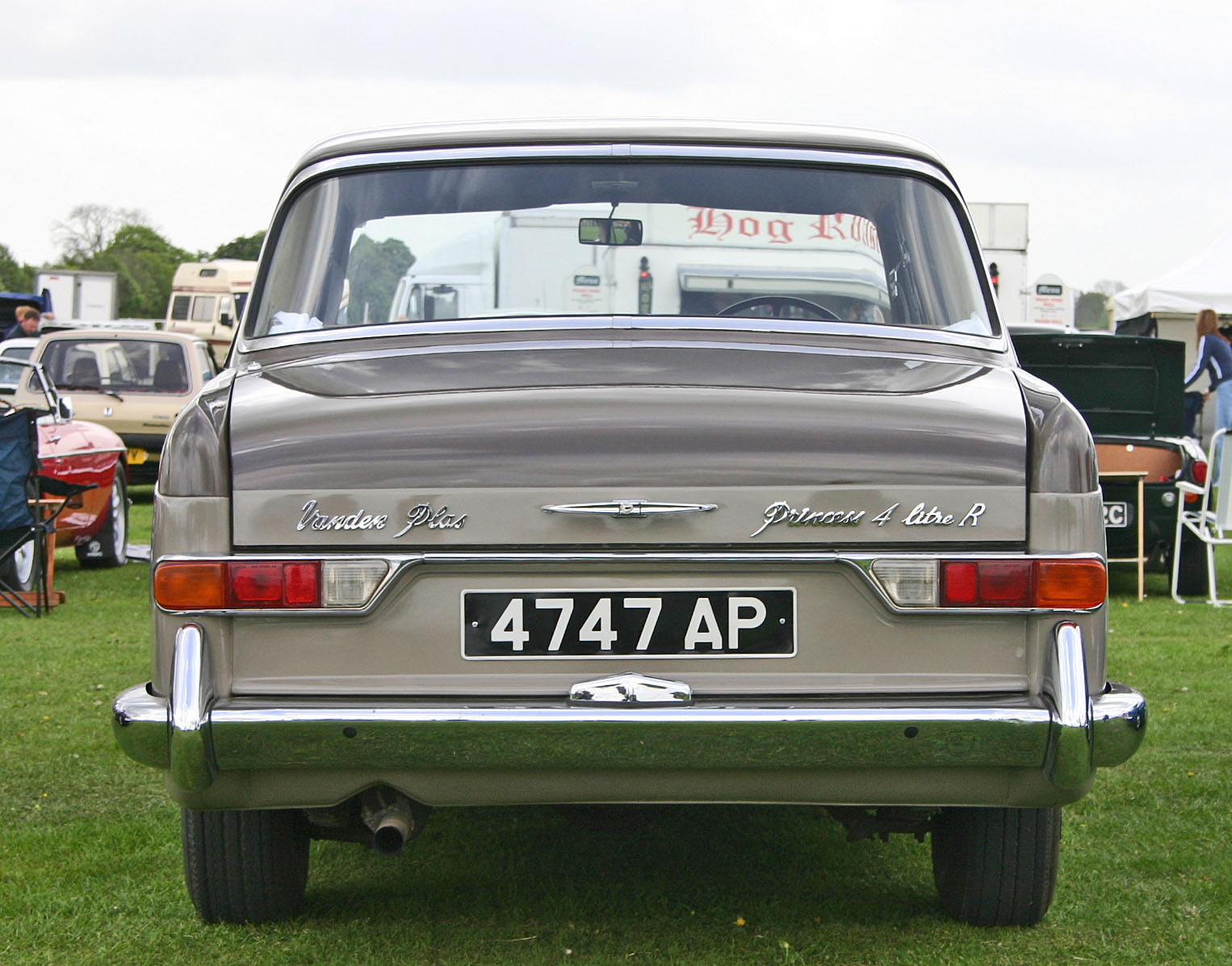
Rear view showing new horizontal lighting arrangement

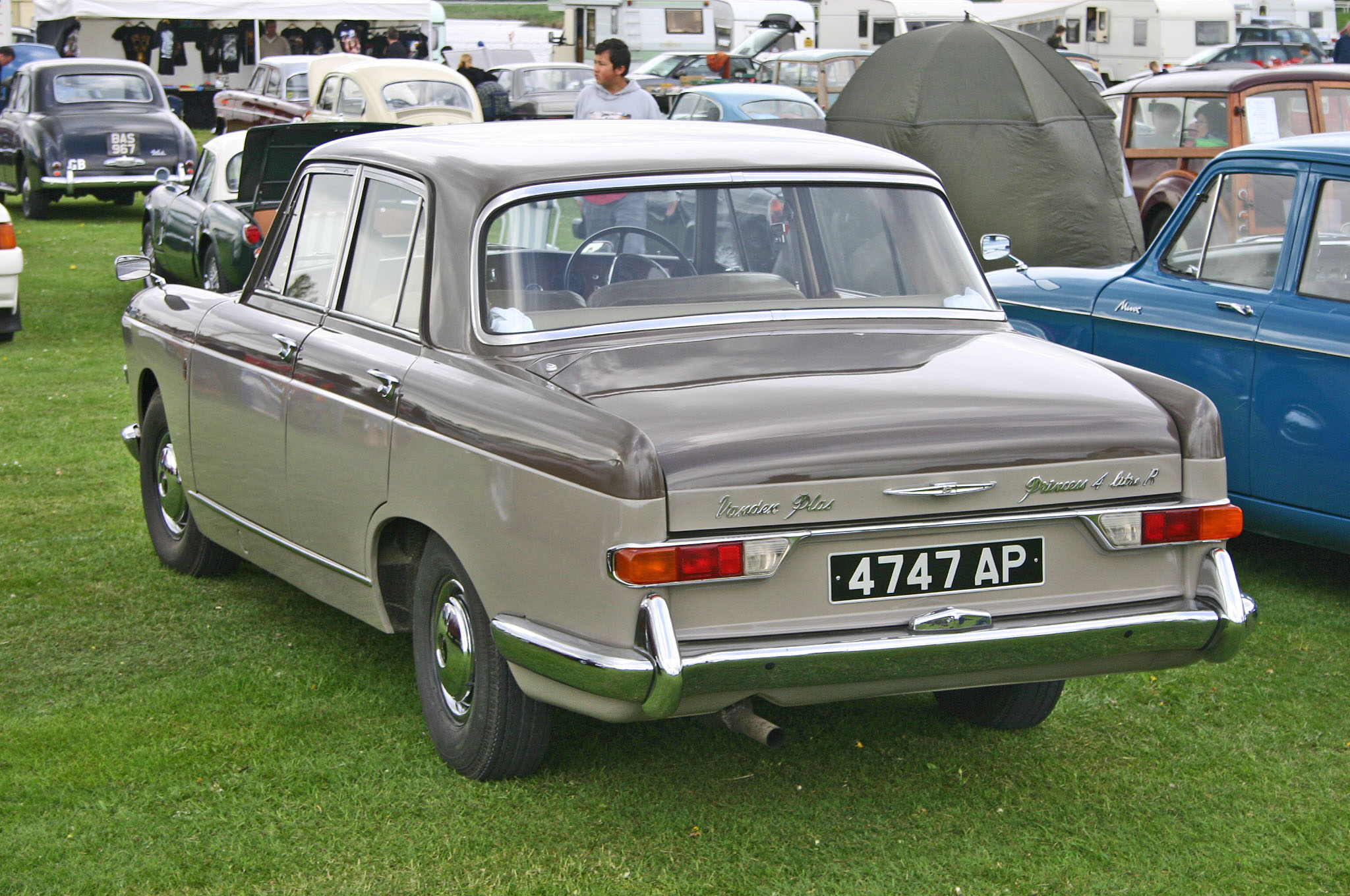
Rear three-quarter view showing revised roofline

== Rolls-Royce Java ==
This car was a result of a joint BMC / Rolls-Royce project for a smaller Bentley code-named Java. Prototypes were made using the Austin-engineered central portion of the Vanden Plas, with restyled Rolls-Royce and Bentley panels front and rear. Neither of these models made it into production. Rolls-Royce withdrew from the venture. They had been covering the possibility that the survival of their motor car division might depend on providing a relatively compact mass-produced Rolls-Royce. However 1965's introduction of the Rolls-Royce Silver Shadow was a success.
