= Austin 3-Litre =

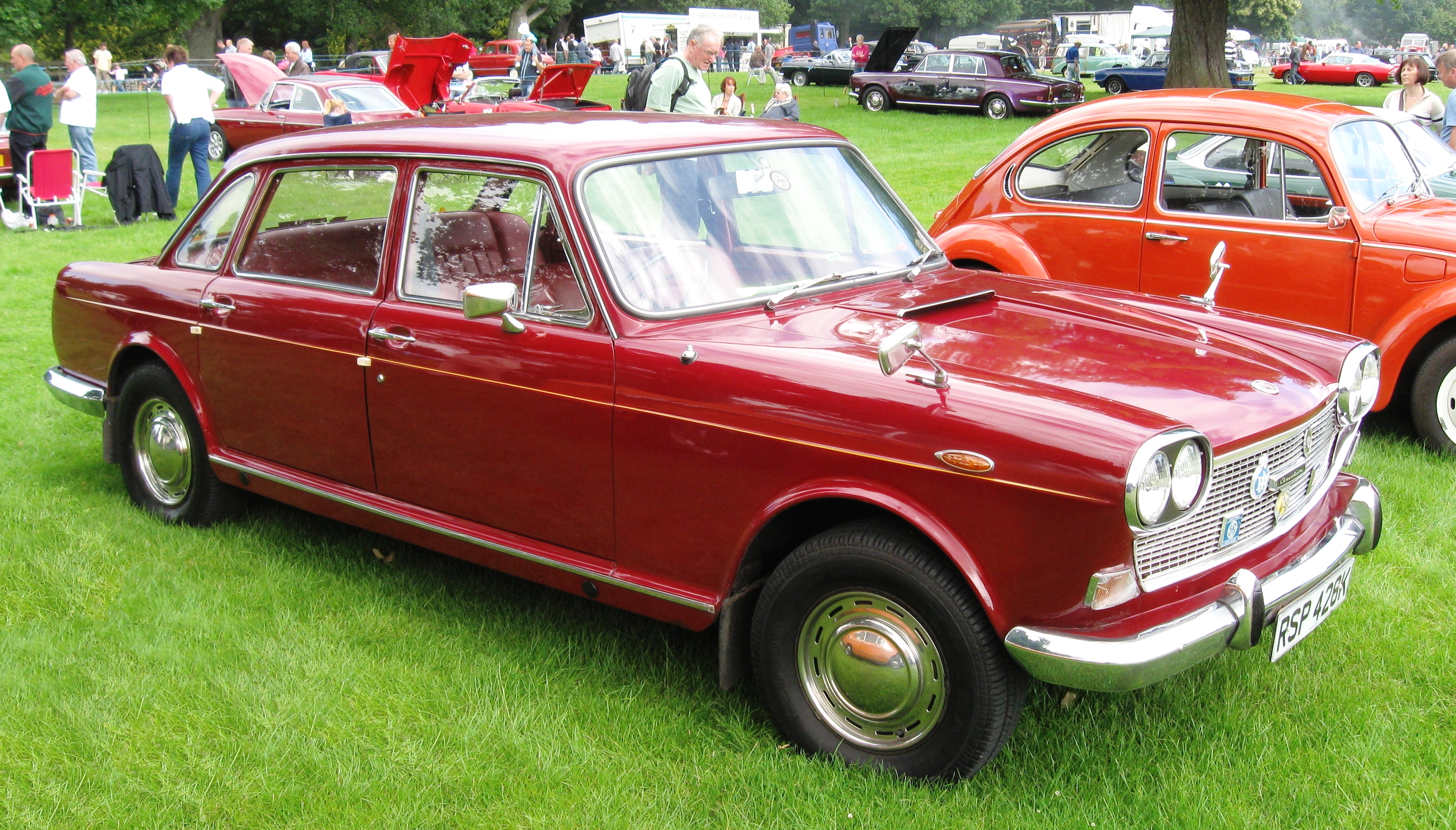
- 1971 Austin 3-Litre

Overview
- Manufacturer: Austin
- Production: October 1967 – May 1971
- Assembly: United Kingdom: Cowley, Oxford

Body and chassis
- Class: Executive car (E)
- Body style: 4-door saloon 5-door estate (Crayford Conversion)
- Layout: Longitudinal front-engine, rear-wheel drive
- Related: Austin 1800-2200

Powertrain
- Engine: 2,912 cc (177.7 cu in) C-Series Straight-6

Dimensions
- Wheelbase: 114.5 in (2,908 mm)
- Length: 185.75 in (4,718 mm)
- Width: 67 in (1,702 mm)
- Height: 56.6 in (1,438 mm)
- Curb weight: 3,304 lb (1,499 kg)

Chronology
- Predecessor: Austin A110
- Successor: None

The Austin 3-Litre is a British saloon car that was introduced by Austin at the London Motor Show in 1967. Codenamed ADO61, the car was intended to be BMC's offering in the 3-litre executive class and was originally designed in the early 1960s, before the British Leyland era. Unlike the visually similar (but smaller) front-wheel drive Morris 1800 range, the 125 bhp 3-litre engine (a 7-bearing modification of the BMC C-Series with twin SU carburettors) drove the rear wheels through a conventional 4-speed gearbox.

The car used Hydrolastic suspension with self-levelling hydraulic rams at the rear and was praised for its excellent ride and handling. Alec Issigonis, who designed the front-wheel drive cars, had no part in the 3-Litre, which he was reportedly keen to point out.

To cater for its intended market, the interior was luxurious, featuring wood veneers and cloth headlining (but leather upholstery was not available, being replaced with a good-quality vinyl) and the boot was longer than that of the 1800, contributing to an overall length of 186 inches (4,700 mm) (the 1800 was 167 inches (4,200 mm) long).

Luxurious Wolseley and Vanden Plas 3-litre versions both reached prototype stage, but went no further.

A small number of estate models were built however, converted by Crayford.

Other body variations of the 3-litre are known to exist including stretch limousines, hearses and ambulances.

It became apparent that BMC were initially not geared up to producing the car: few or none seem to have been sold in 1967, but by July 1968, it was reported that the cars had begun to leave the factory. By that time, the square headlights seen at the 1967 motor show had been replaced by conventional round twin headlamp units, and by the time of the October 1968 show the car had also acquired front quarter lights. In July 1968, with cars beginning to emerge from the plant, the manufacturers were asked to detail improvements reportedly implemented since the car's "launch" the previous October. Mention was made of orifice modifications to hydraulic valves in the rear suspension, and it was stated that there was a "new" final drive ratio of 3.9:1, though this was actually the same final drive ratio included in the launch information the previous October.

In the early days of British Leyland, proposals for a Rover-branded version were considered to replace the Rover P5 3-Litre but these did not progress beyond the drawing board. A number were converted to hearses; the Woodhall Nicholson conversion was voted Hearse of the year in 1968.

Sales were fairly poor. The standard version had been withdrawn by 1969, while the de-luxe version soldiered on until the model was discontinued completely in May 1971, after fewer than 10,000 had been produced. It suffered from a perception that it was merely an enlarged Morris "Landcrab" (indeed, it gained the nickname "Land-lobster"), with which it shared its doors – a perception that was exacerbated further when the smaller Austin Maxi also used the same bodywork, although the 3-Litre was in fact a quite different car. BMC also failed to take into account the changing tastes in the 'executive' sector of the car market. Cars such as the Rover P6 and the Triumph 2000 had set new standards for handling in the class and had smaller but more efficient engines as well as more fashionable and modern styling. The 3-Litre was very much in the spirit of its Austin Westminster predecessor – a large car with an understressed large-capacity engine that put an emphasis on luxury and ride comfort over handling and economy, although both these last two factors were becoming more important in the sector.

The 3-Litre also arrived on the market just as BMC had taken over Jaguar and had merged with Leyland Motors to create British Leyland (BL). Within the new conglomerate, the 3-Litre was now being sold alongside similarly sized rivals from Jaguar, Rover and Triumph – all perceived as genuine performance/luxury brands compared to Austin, which was seen as a downmarket mainstream brand. For this reason the 3-Litre was not directly replaced, and ultimately the Rover SD1 and Jaguar XJ fulfilled the 3-Litre's role in BL's portfolio.

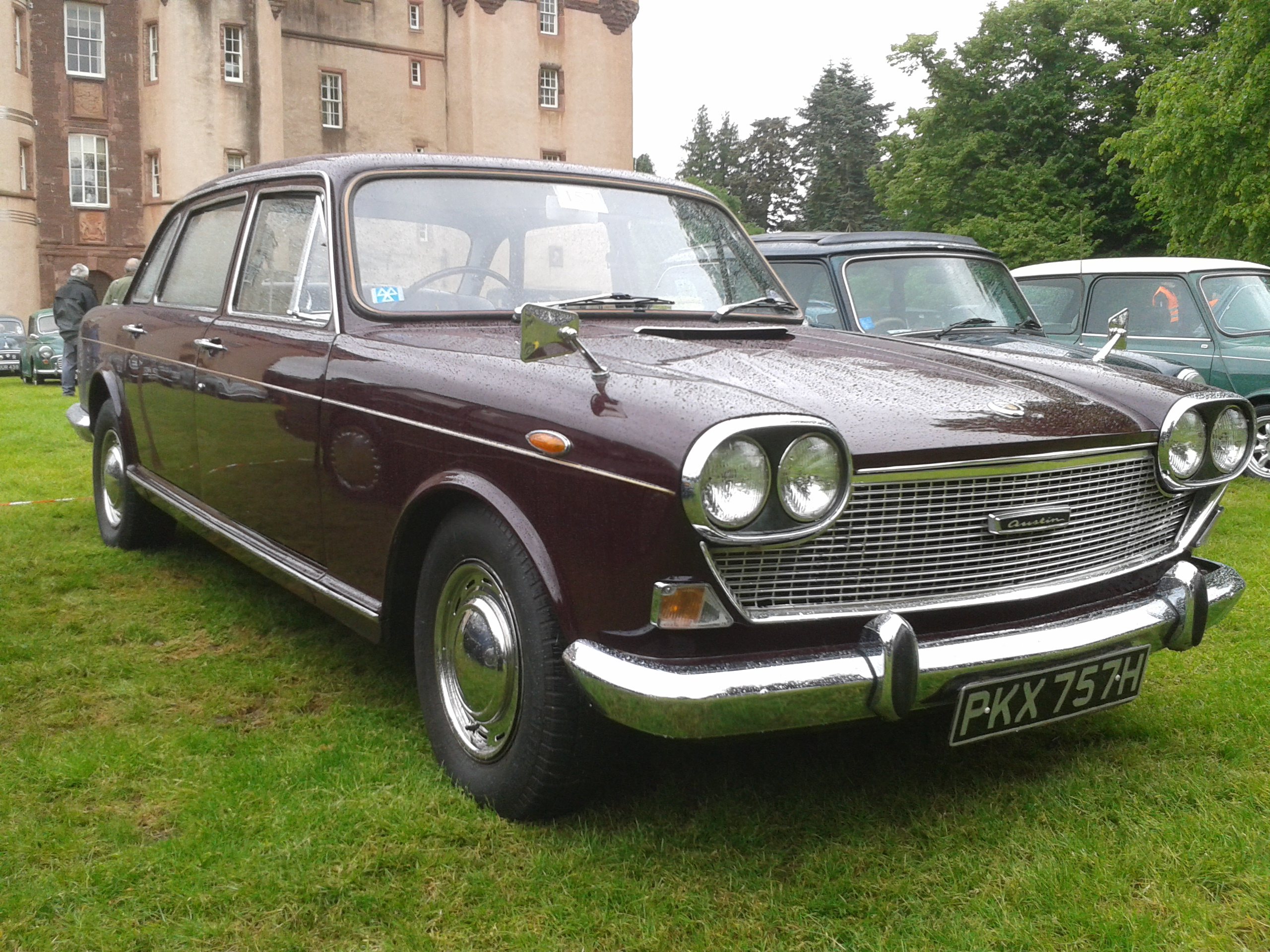
Austin 3 Litre front view

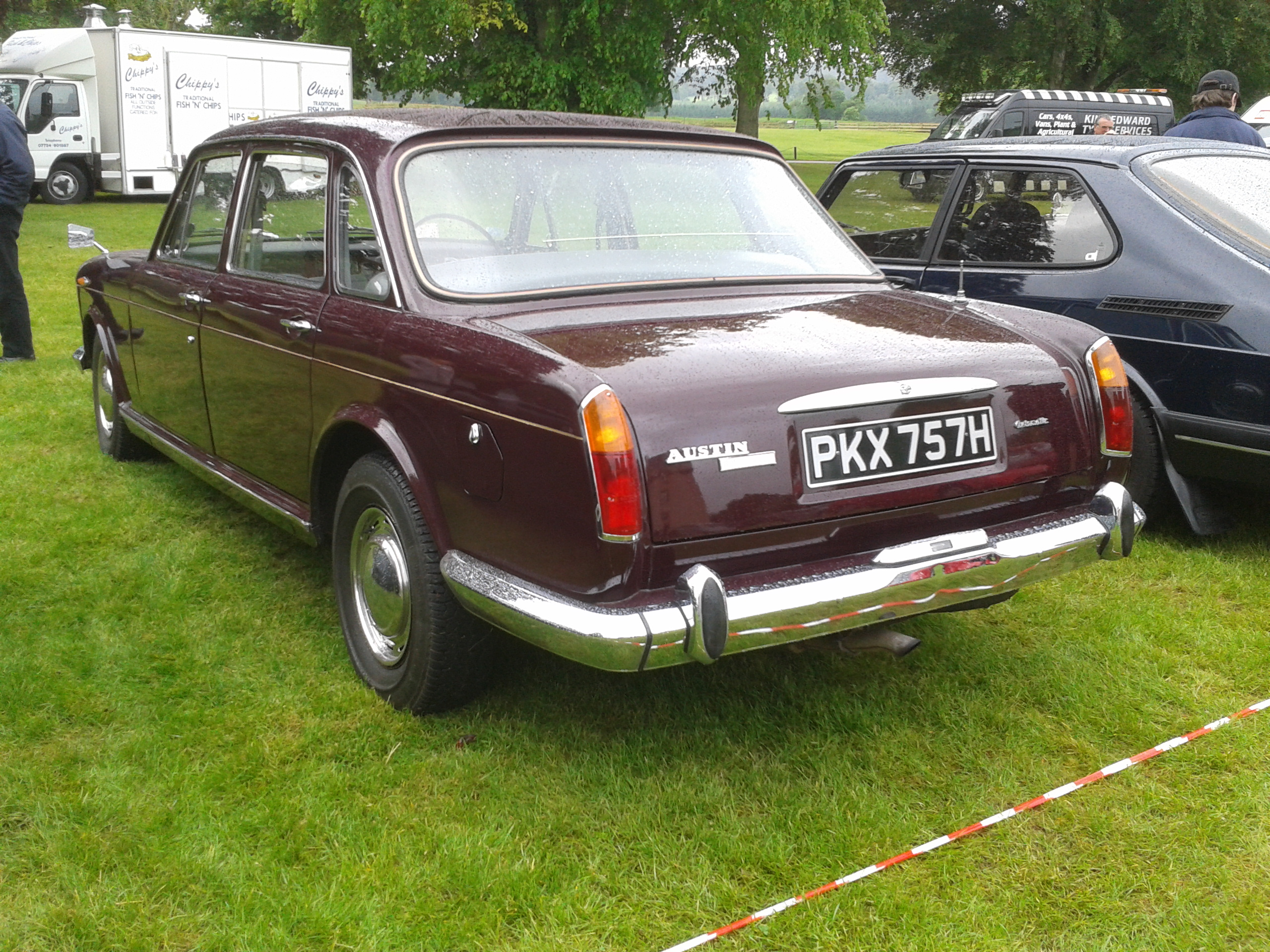
Austin 3 Litre rear view
