= Westland Weasel =

Weasel
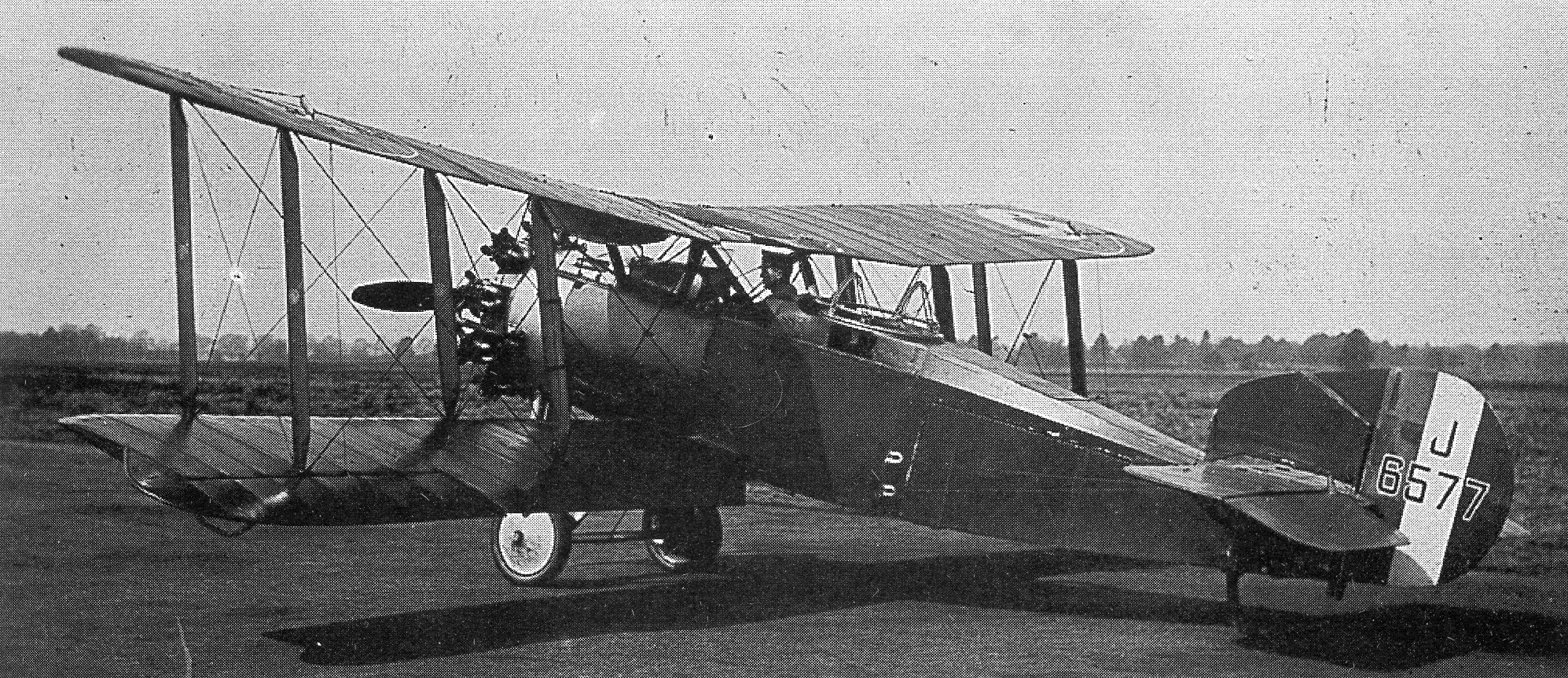

General information
- Type: Fighter
- National origin: United Kingdom
- Manufacturer: Westland Aircraft
- Status: Prototype
- Number built: 4

History
- First flight: November 1918
- Retired: 1925

The Westland Weasel was a prototype British two-seat fighter/reconnaissance aircraft of the First World War. Designed to replace the Bristol Fighter, the Weasel was a single engined tractor biplane. Four prototypes were built, but no production followed owing to the failure of its original engine, although the prototypes were used as engine test beds for the successful Armstrong Siddeley Jaguar and Bristol Jupiter engines.

== Development and design ==
The Westland Weasel was designed by Westland Aircraft of Yeovil to meet the Royal Air Force's Type IIIA Specification for a two-seat fighter/reconnaissance aircraft to replace the successful Bristol Fighter. An order for three prototypes was placed in April 1918, together with orders for competing designs from Bristol (the Badger) and Austin Motors (the Greyhound). The Weasel was a two-bay biplane of wood and fabric construction, with the pilot and observer/gunner seated close together in separate cockpits, with the upper wing above the pilot being cut away to improve the upwards view. Armament was similar to the Bristol Fighter, with two synchronised Vickers guns and one or two Lewis guns for the observer. Like the other two competitors, the Weasel was powered by the officially encouraged ABC Dragonfly 9-cylinder air-cooled radial engine.

The first prototype, although largely complete by the end of June, had to wait for delivery of an engine, and did not fly until late November 1918, after the Armistice ended World War I. As with the many other British aircraft projects of 1918, use of the Dragonfly engine proved a disaster, with the engine not only being underpowered and overweight, but more seriously, plagued with rapid overheating and severe vibration. These problems were unsolvable, and although the Weasel had slightly better performance than the Bristol and Austin designs, the failure of the Dragonfly and the lack of urgent need to replace the excellent Bristol Fighter meant that large scale orders did not follow.

Despite this, an order was placed for a fourth prototype to serve as an engine testbed. The first and third prototypes were fitted with the Armstrong Siddeley Jaguar radial, while the second and fourth aircraft were fitted with the Bristol Jupiter engine. These aircraft proved valuable testbeds, with the last Weasel remaining in use until May 1925.

== Specifications (Dragonfly engine) ==
Data from War Planes of the First World War: Volume Three

General characteristics

- Crew: 2
- Length: 24 ft 10 in (7.57 m)
- Wingspan: 35 ft 6 in (10.82 m)
- Height: 10 ft 1 in (3.07 m)
- Wing area: 368 sq ft (34.2 m^{2})
- Empty weight: 1,867 lb (847 kg)
- Powerplant: 1 × ABC Dragonfly I 9-cylinder air-cooled radial piston engine, 320 hp (240 kW)
- Propellers: 2-bladed fixed-pitch propeller

Performance

- Maximum speed: 131 mph (211 km/h, 114 kn) 65,000 ft (19,812 m)
- Service ceiling: 20,700 ft (6,300 m)
- Time to altitude: 15,000 ft (4,572 m) in 19 minutes
- Wing loading: 8.35 lb/sq ft (40.8 kg/m^{2})
- Power/mass: 0.10 hp/lb (0.16 kW/kg)

Armament

- Guns: 2x forward firing, synchronised .303 in Vickers machine guns and 1 or 2× Lewis guns on Scarff ring in rear cockpit

== See also ==
Aircraft of comparable role, configuration, and era

- Bristol Badger
- Austin Greyhound
