= Austin Greyhound =

Greyhound

General information
- Type: Fighter/reconnaissance
- National origin: British
- Manufacturer: Austin Motor Company
- Status: Prototype
- Number built: 3

The Austin Greyhound was a British two-seat biplane fighter aircraft of World War I built by car manufacturer Austin. Owing to the end of the War and an unreliable engine, it was unsuccessful, only three being built.

== Development and design ==
In 1918, Britain's Royal Air Force issued the Type III specification for a replacement for the Bristol F.2 Fighter to be powered by the new ABC Dragonfly radial engine. The Austin Motor Company, who had produced large numbers of aircraft, including 800 Royal Aircraft Factory S.E.5s, submitted a design by J Kenworthy, formerly of the Royal Aircraft Factory, which was named the Austin Greyhound. An order for three prototypes was placed on 18 May 1918.

The Greyhound was a two-bay biplane of all-wooden construction. The Greyhound's engine was covered by a conical cowling, with the cylinder heads protruding. The circular shape of the cowling continued down the fuselage. The upper and lower wings were almost the same size.

While the first prototype was quickly built, problems with the Dragonfly engine, which was found to be overweight and underpowered, and to have unsolvable reliability problems, meant that testing was delayed, with the second prototype being delivered to the Aeroplane and Armament Experimental Establishment at Martlesham Heath in January 1919, being followed by the first prototype in May and the third in February 1920. Although performance was good no production was ordered of any of the competitors, with the Bristol Fighter remaining in service until 1932. The last Greyhound remained in use as a flying test bed at the Royal Aircraft Establishment, Farnborough until June 1922.

== Specifications ==
Data from War Planes of the First World War:Volume One: Fighters

General characteristics

- Crew: 2
- Length: 26 ft 8.5 in (8.14 m)
- Wingspan: 39 ft 0 in (11.89 m)
- Height: 10 ft 4 in (3.15 m)
- Wing area: 400 sq ft (37.2 m^{2})
- Empty weight: 1,838 lb (835 kg)
- Gross weight: 3,032 lb (1,378 kg)
- Powerplant: 1 × ABC Dragonfly I nine-cylinder air cooled radial engine , 320 hp (239 kW)

Performance

- Maximum speed: 129 mph (208 km/h, 112 kn)
- Endurance: 3 hours
- Service ceiling: 19,000 ft (5,790 m)
- Rate of climb: 920 ft/min (4.7 m/s)

Armament

- Two synchronised .303 in Vickers machine guns
- One .303 in Lewis gun on Scarff ring in rear cockpit

== See also ==
Aircraft of comparable role, configuration, and era

- Bristol Badger
- Westland Weasel
