= Austin K5 =

British heavy military truck

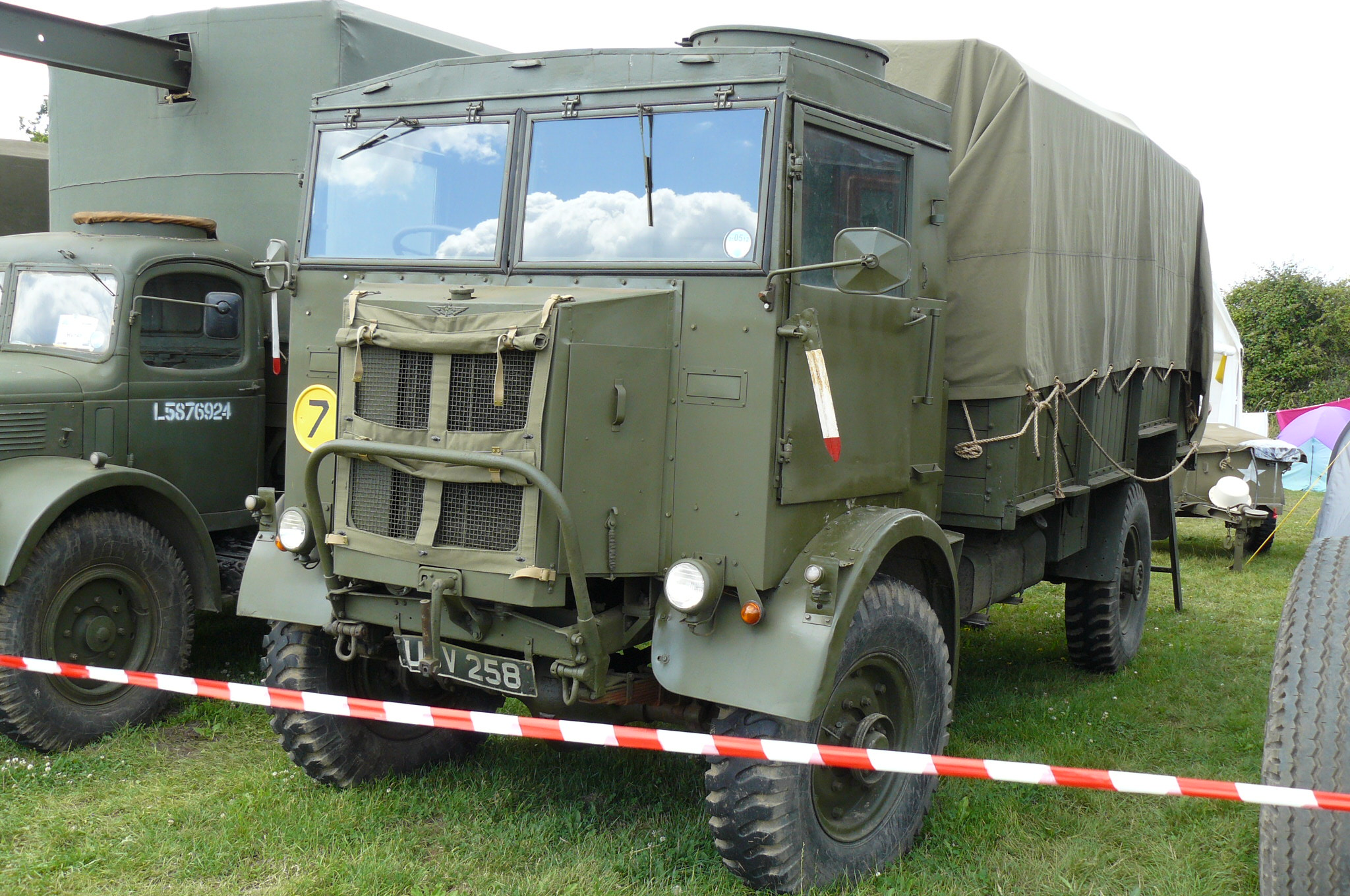
- Austin K5 general cargo lorry
- Type: Military truck
- Place of origin: United Kingdom

Service history
- In service: Second World War

Production history
- Manufacturer: Austin
- Produced: 1941-1945
- No. built: 12,280

Specifications
- Mass: 6.7 tonnes
- Length: 19 ft 8 inches (5.99 m)
- Width: 7 ft 3 inch (2.21 m)
- Height: 9 ft 11 in (3.02 m)
- Armour: None
- Engine: Austin 6-cylinder, 3995 cc, petrol 85 hp
- Payload capacity: 3 tons
- Suspension: Wheel, 4 × 4

The Austin K5 was a British heavy military truck built by Austin for use during the Second World War.

The K5 was used with open body and cab for carrying the Ordnance QF 6 pounder anti-tank gun portee in the North African Campaign or with an enclosed cab for General Service (GS). Enclosed body versions were used for salvage and rescue work in the UK.

It was nicknamed the "Screamer" because of a rather noisy transfer case.
