= Austin Motor Company =

Defunct English manufacturer of motor vehicles

The Austin Motor Company Limited
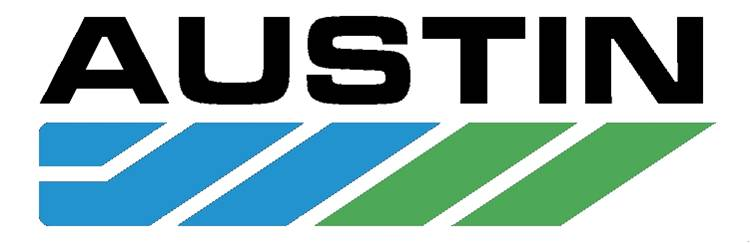
- Industry: Automotive
- Founded: December 1905
- Founder: Herbert Austin
- Defunct: 1952
- Fate: Merged with Morris Motors
- Successor: British Motor Corporation
- Headquarters: Longbridge, England
- Products: Automobiles / Rover / Austin Rover / MG / Morris

Austin marque
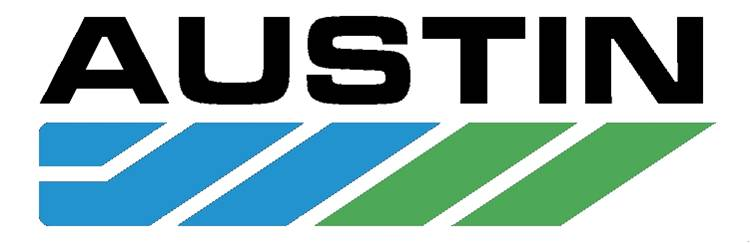
- Logo of the Austin automotive brand.
- Product type: Automotive marque
- Current owner: SAIC Motor
- Discontinued: 1988
- Previous owners: Austin Motor Company (1905–1952); BMC (1952–1967); British Leyland (Austin Rover) (1967–1988); Rover Group (1988–2005); Nanjing Automobile Group (2005–2007); SAIC Motor (2007–Present)

The Austin Motor Company Limited was a British manufacturer of motor vehicles, founded in 1905 by Herbert Austin in Longbridge. In 1952, it was merged with Morris Motors Limited to form the new holding company British Motor Corporation (BMC) Limited, while retaining its separate identity. The marque Austin was used by BMC's successors, British Leyland and Rover Group, until 1987. The trademark is currently owned by the Chinese firm SAIC Motor, after being transferred from bankrupt subsidiary Nanjing Automotive, which had acquired it with MG Rover Group in July 2005.

== History ==
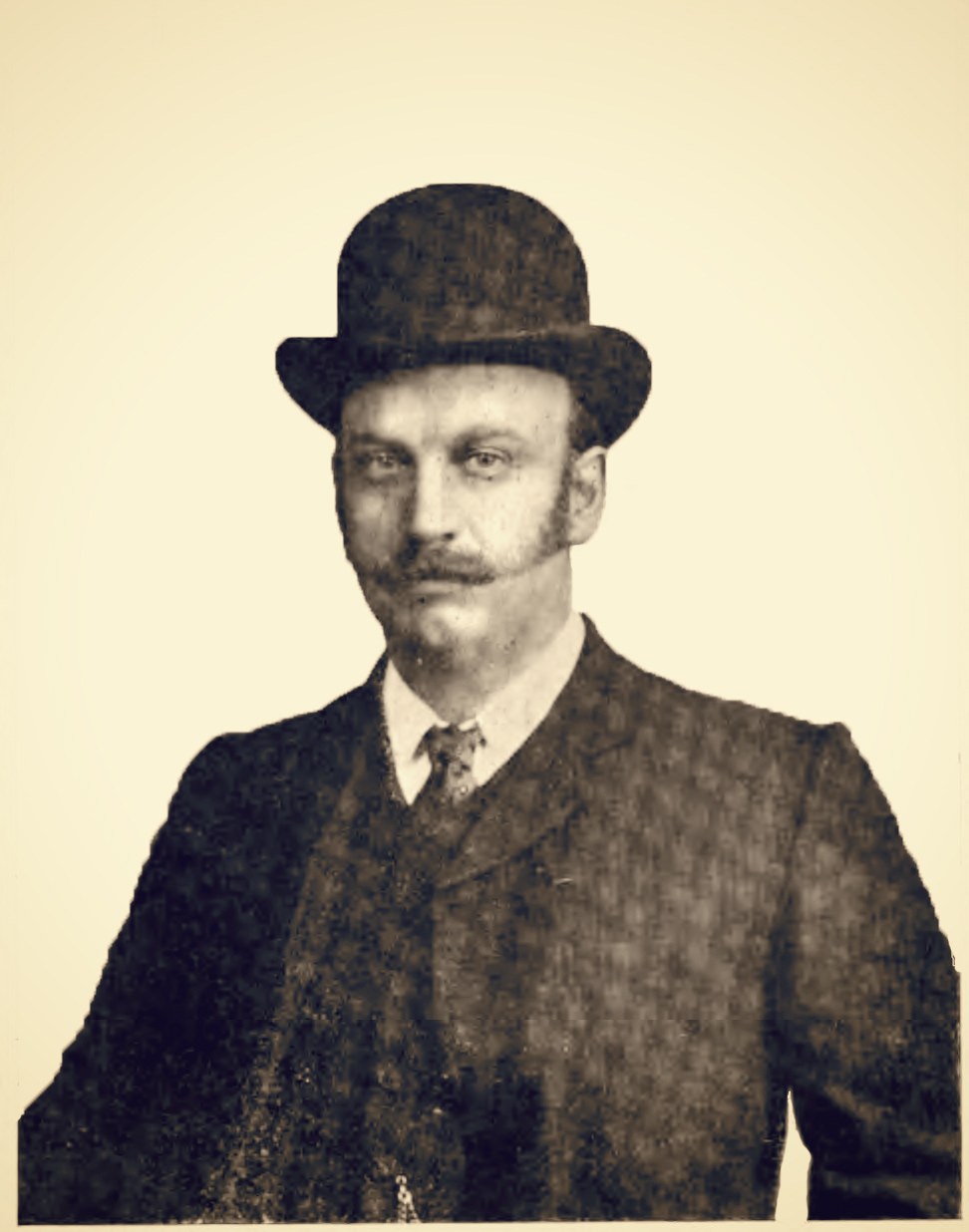
Herbert Austin 1905 (Note: "Mr H Austin, who has for so many years been associated with the Wolseley Tool and Motor Car Company, Limited, and who is starting new works, where he will manufacture Austin Cars, at Longbridge, near Birmingham" Mr H Austin, who has been for so long associated with the Wolseley Tool and Motor Car Co. of Adderley Park, Birmingham, advises us that he is leaving the Company, and is starting works on his own account situated at Longbridge, near Birmingham, where he will manufacture vehicles which are to be known as the Austin Cars. At first Mr Austin will turn out two sizes of tourist cars viz., a 15–20 hp and a 25–30 hp. both of which models will embody the best approved principles in design, and Mr Austin proposes to use only the highest grade of materials in their manufacture. Moderation is to govern the selling price, and Mr Austin hopes to make the car of his name a household word for reliability and good service. Captan Frank Kayser is associated with Mr Austin in the new undertaking and he will be assisted by a specially-selected staff, several of whom have been connected with him in the past. The works are of considerable extent, covering several acres, and are thoroughly suitable for the construction of automobiles of all types. Mr Austin hopes to have his first 25–30 hp car on the road by 1 December and to commence deliveries by the end of March 1906. Mr Austin sends us, in a tabulated form, an extremely interesting record gained by the cars which have been turned out by the Wolseley Company during his direction of that Company. This list bristles with gold and silver medals in all the leading reliability and consumption trials, exhibitions etc whilst in the speed events and hill-climbing contests, the number of winners makes a formidable show, these triumphs being in addition to the selection by the A.C.G.B.I. of the Wolseley racers in 1904 and 1905 for the Gordon Bennett Race. The Automotor Journal, 4 November 1905 Page 1366) "Mr Austin is starting new works, where he will manufacture Austin Cars at Longbridge, near Birmingham"

=== 1905–1918: Formation and development ===
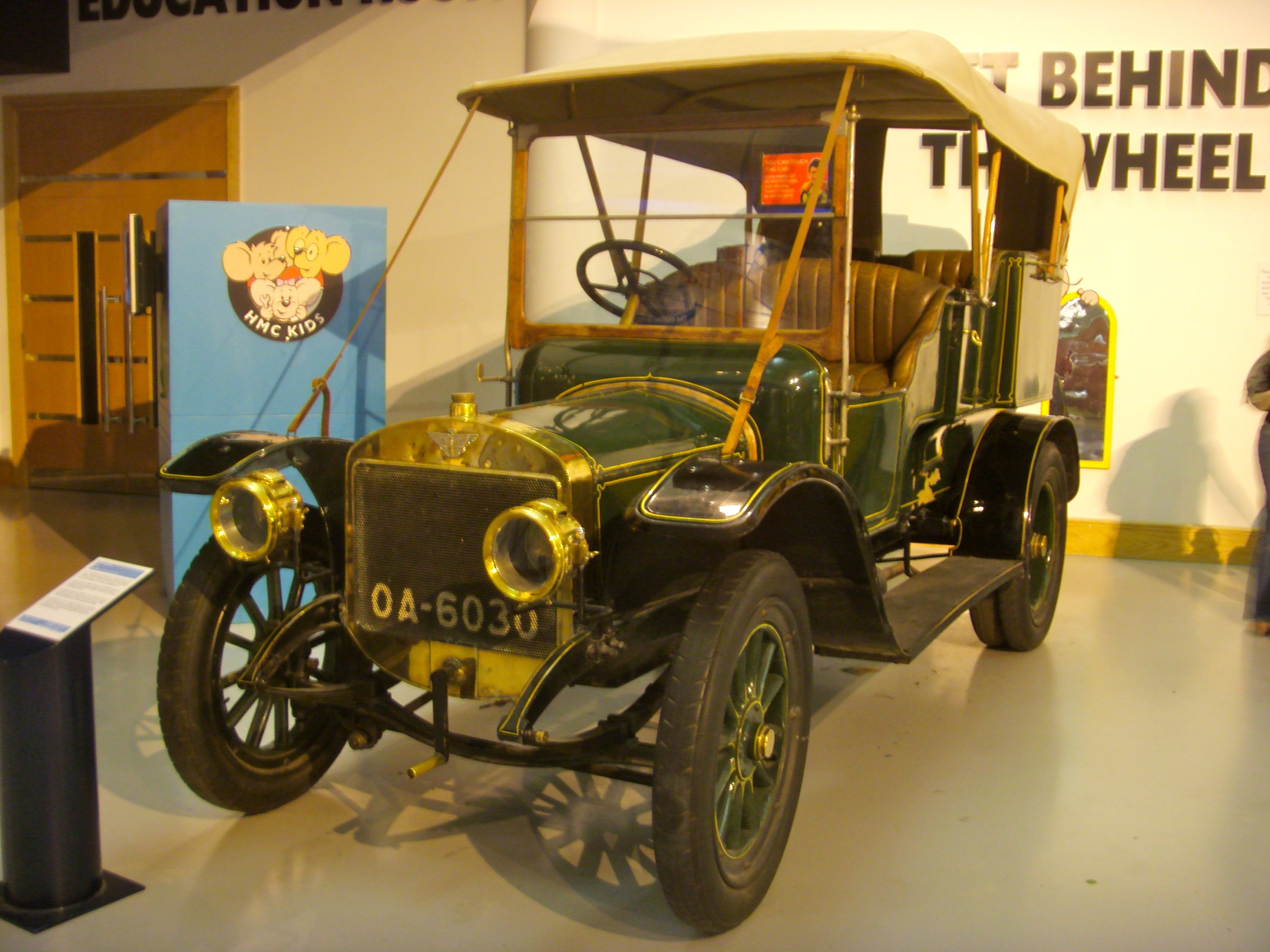
1907 30hp

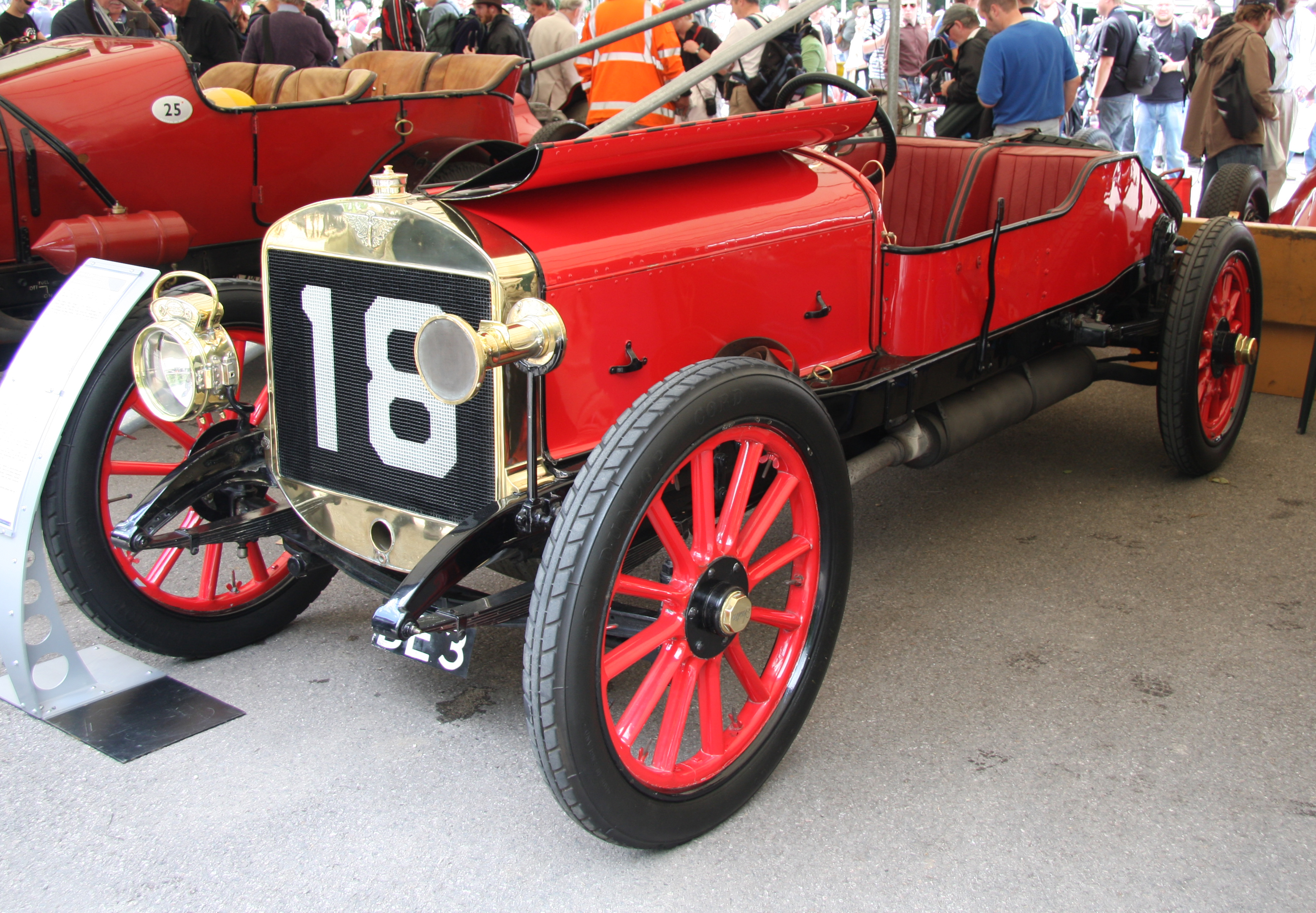
1908 100hp Grand Prix Race Car

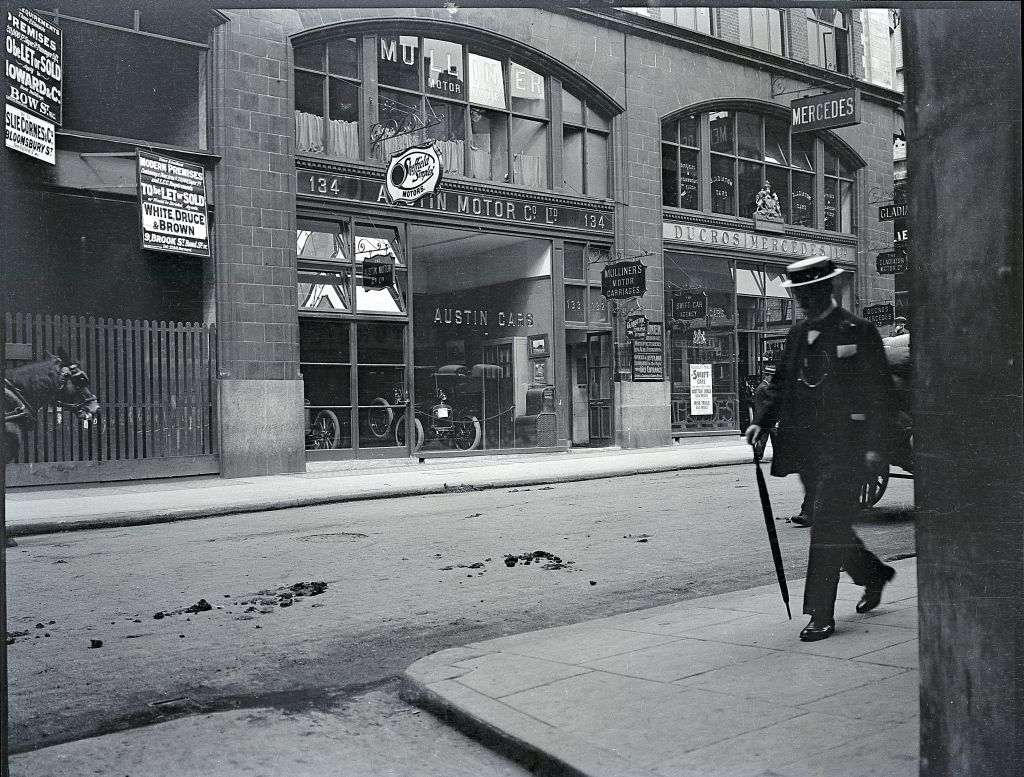
Austin Motors showroom, Long Acre, London, c. 1910

While running the original Wolseley business, which had a highly cyclical sales pattern, Herbert Austin searched for products with a steady demand. Starting in 1895, he built three cars in his free time. They were among Britain's first cars. The third car, a four-wheeler, was completed in 1899. By 1901, his fellow directors could not see future profit in motor vehicles and so with their blessing and the backing of the Vickers brothers Austin started a separate car manufacturing business still using the name Wolseley.

In 1905, he fell out with Thomas and Albert Vickers over engine design. Leaving his creation, Wolseley, which he had made into Britain's largest motor vehicle manufacturer, Austin obtained the backing of steel magnate Frank Kayser for his own enterprise. Kayser provided funds through mortgages and loans, debentures and guarantees to the Midland Bank thereby allowing Austin to keep virtually total ownership of the business through his personal savings. Further assistance came from Dunlop patent holder Harvey du Cros. However, Austin's great rival, William Morris, was able to enter the industry proper (he first repaired cars) a little later funding his operation entirely from his own resources.

In November 1905, Herbert Austin acquired a disused printing works which was less than a decade old. It was located seven miles south-west of Birmingham in the then small village of Longbridge in Worcestershire. The following month The Austin Motor Company Limited was incorporated. In the last week of April 1906, a large body of motorists travelled to Longbridge "where snow lay full three inches deep on the ground and was still falling fast" to see the new Austin car, a conventional four-cylinder model with chain drive. It was available as a 15/20 hp complete at £500 (chassis, £425) and a 25/30 hp for £650 (chassis, £550). The sole concessionaire for sale of the cars was Mr Harvey Du Cros junior.

Two things were noticeable about Austin's new design. He had parted from the Vickers brothers because he had refused to use the then more conventional vertical engine in Wolseley cars. His new car had a vertical engine and, in all but minor detail, was identical to the English-built Clément-Gladiators assembled in the same factory.

A further injection of capital was needed in 1906 and William Harvey Du Cros (1846–1918) joined the board of directors. After that Harvey Du Cros junior of the Swift Cycle Co and Austin each held approximately half of the ordinary capital. Herbert Austin remained chairman and managing director.

Austin's cars, like Wolseley's, were luxury vehicles. The published customer list included Russian Grand Dukes, Princesses, Bishops, high officials of the Spanish government and a long list of Britain's highest nobility.

production by year
	1906	1907	1908	1909	1910	1911	1912	1913
Turnover	14,771	84,930	119,744	169,821	209,048	276,195	354,209	425,641
Cars	31	180	218				1,107	1,500
Employees		270				1,500	1,800	2,300

In 1912 Wolseley sold 3,000 cars.

In February 1914, Austin-manufactured bodies in tourer, limousine, landaulette and coupé styles could be provided with engines of 15, 20, 30 and 60 hp. Ambulances and commercial vehicles were also provided.

Austin became a Public Listed Company in 1914 when the capital was increased to £650,000 (equivalent to £63,563,900.77 in 2025). > At that point, in quantity of the number of vehicles produced, it probably ranked fifth after Wolseley (still largest), Humber, Sunbeam and Rover.

The Austin Motor Company expanded and benefitted enormously during the First World War fulfilling UK Government contracts for aircraft, shells, heavy guns and generating sets and 1,600 three-ton trucks most of which were sent to Russia. The workforce expanded from around 2,500 to 22,000 members of staff.

=== 1919–1939: Interwar success ===
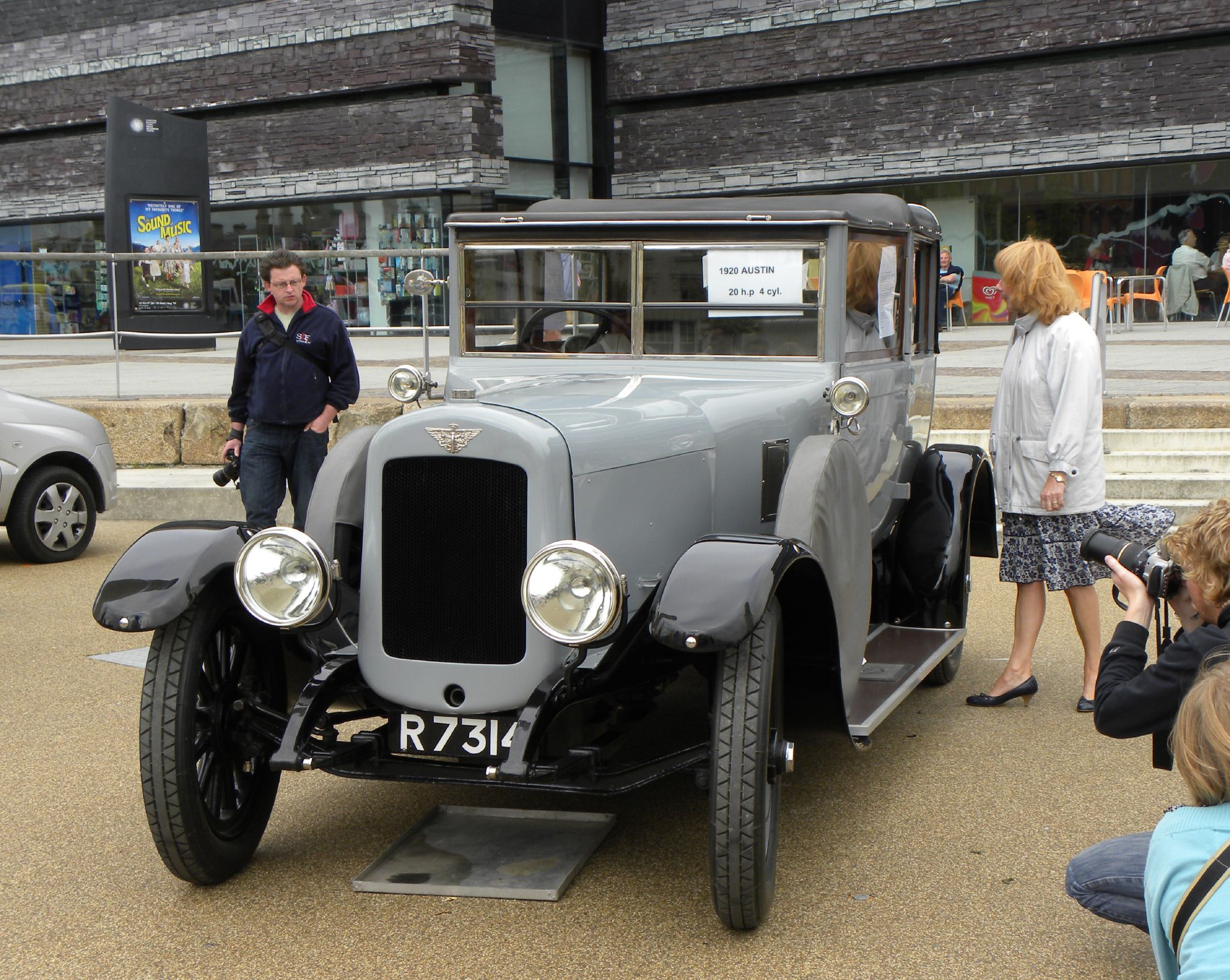
1920 Twenty 3.6-litre allweather coupé

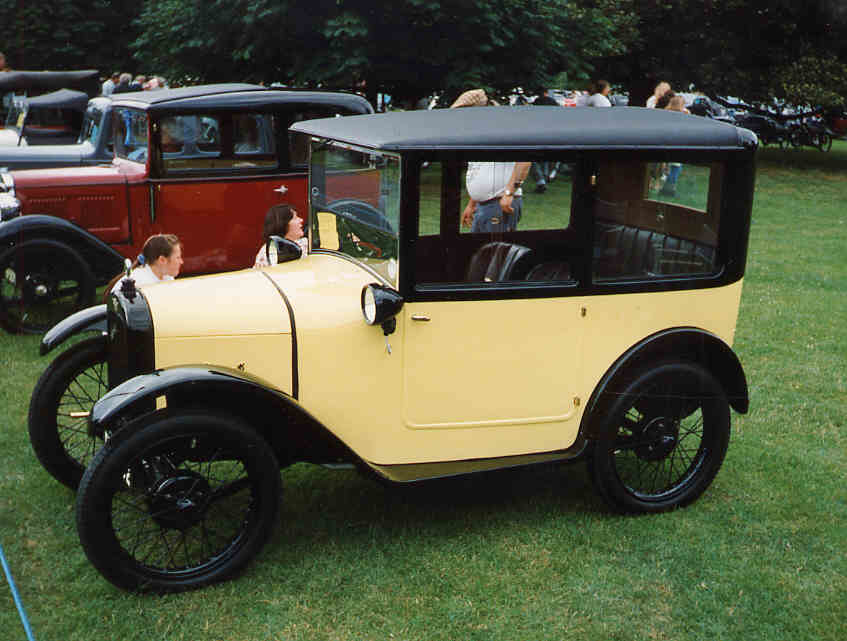
1926 Seven box saloon

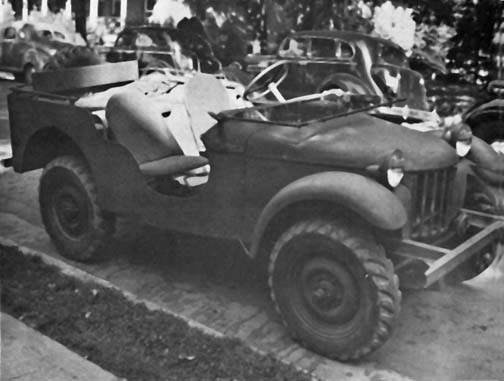
Bantam's first prototype – the BRC Pilot model ("Old Number One")

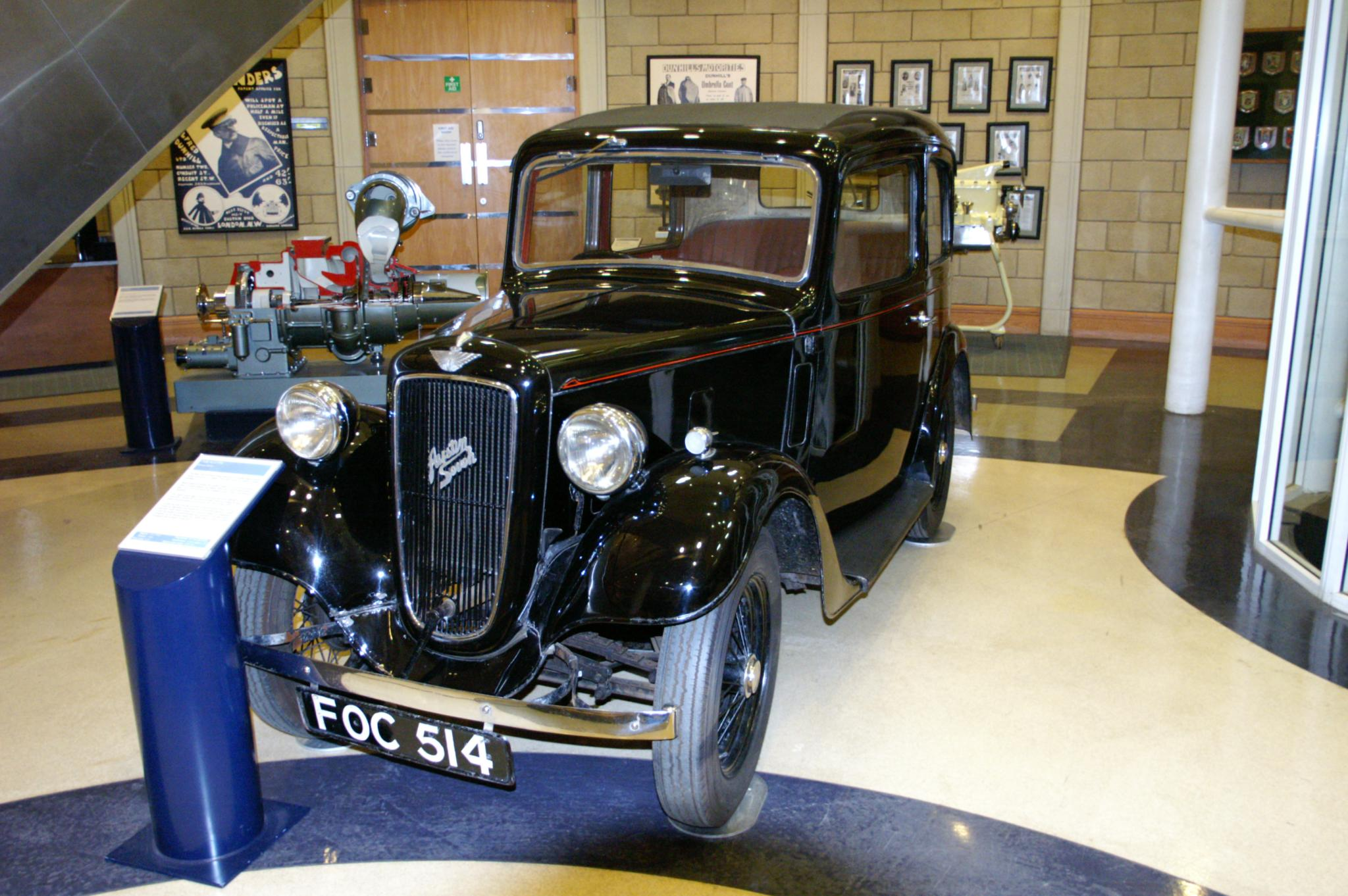
Austin Seven Ruby

After the Great War ended, Austin decided on a one-model policy based on the 3620 cc 20 hp engine. Versions included cars, commercials and even a tractor; but sales volumes were never enough to fill the vast factory built during wartime. The company went into receivership in 1921 but rose again from the downturn after financial restructuring. Though Herbert Austin remained as chairman, he was no longer managing director and from that time onwards; decisions were made by a committee.

Critical to the recovery was the appointment in 1922 of a new finance director, Ernest Payton with the backing of the Midland Bank, and a new works director in charge of car production, Carl Engelbach, at the insistence of the creditors' committee. This triumvirate of Austin, Payton and Engelbach steered the company's fortunes through the interwar years.

In a quest to expand market share, smaller cars were introduced, the 1661 cc Twelve in 1922 and, later the same year, the Seven, an inexpensive, simple small car and one of the earliest to be directed at a mass market. One of the reasons for a market demand for a car like the Austin 7 was the British tax code. In 1930, every personal car was taxed by its engine size, which in American dollars was $2.55 per cubic inch of piston displacement. As an example, the owner of an Austin 7 in England, which sold for approximately $455, would have to pay a yearly engine tax of $39. In comparison, the owner in England of a Ford Model-A would have to pay $120 per year in an engine tax. And this system of engine displacement tax was common in other European nations as well in the 1930s. At one point, the "Baby Austin" was built under licence by the fledgling BMW of Germany (as the Dixi); by the Japanese manufacturer Datsun; as the Bantam in the United States; and as the Rosengart in France. In 1930, the Austin 7 was the most produced car in 1930.

The American Austin Car Company struggled to sell tiny Austin cars in the US market. It operated as a largely independent subsidiary from 1929-34 was revived after bankruptcy under the name "American Bantam" from 1937-41. They became best known as the first company to submit the Bantam Reconnaissance Car working prototype, saving time by using Austin nose and wing parts of what would evolve into the extremely successful and iconic WWII Willys MB "Jeep". The design was unfortunately handed over to Willys and Ford for production with a revised nose and fender design, while Bantam would largely just manufacture trailers during the war.

With the help of the Seven, Austin weathered the worst of the Great Depression and remained profitable throughout the 1930s, producing a wider range of cars which was steadily updated by the introduction of all-steel bodies, Girling brakes, and synchromesh gearboxes. However, all the engines retained the same side-valve configuration. Deputy chairman Ernest Payton became chairman in 1941 upon the death of Lord Austin. In 1938, Leonard Lord joined the company board and became chairman in 1946 upon the death of Ernest Payton.

==== Datsun ====
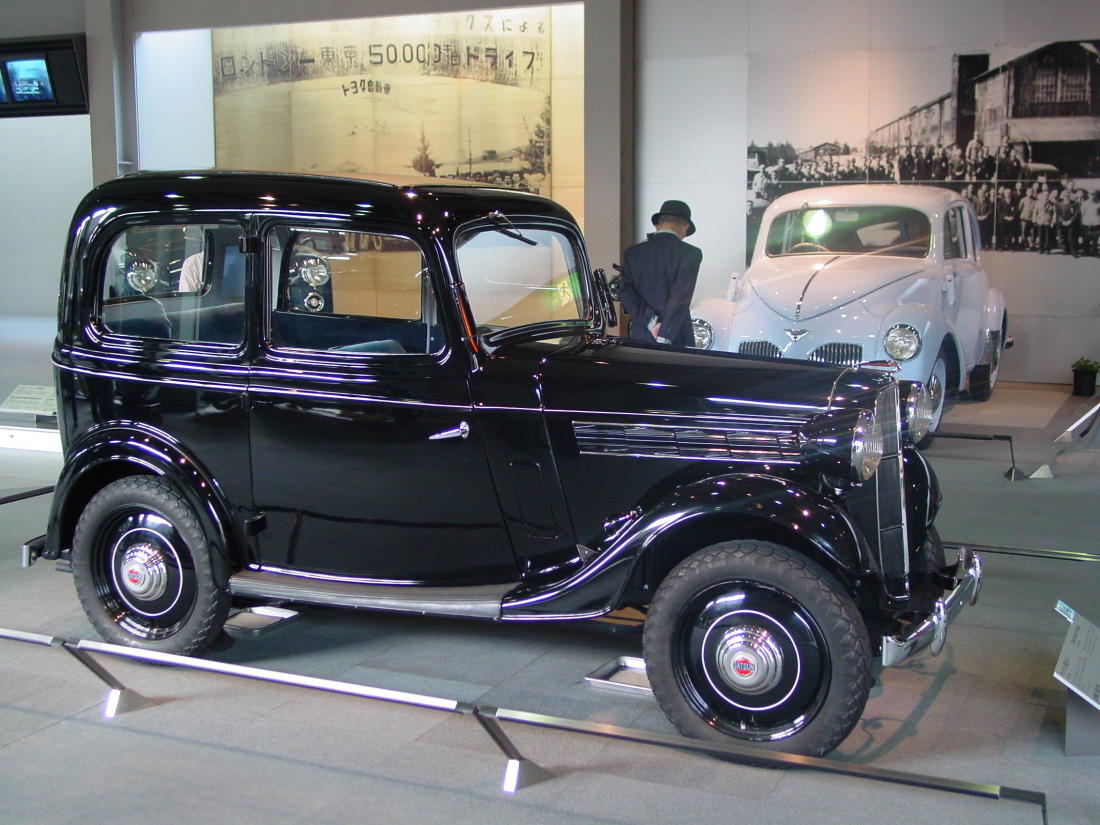
Datsun model 16—Ruby Seven

In 1932, Datsun built cars infringing Austin patents. From 1934, Datsun began to build Sevens under licence and this operation became the greatest success of Austin's overseas licensing of its Seven. It marked the beginning of Datsun's international success.

In 1952, Austin entered into another agreement with Datsun for assembly of 2,000 imported Austins from "knock-down kits", to be sold in Japan under the Austin trademark. The agreement called for Nissan to make all Austin parts locally within three years, a goal Nissan met. Nissan produced and marketed Austins for seven years. The agreement also gave Nissan rights to use Austin patents, which Nissan used in developing its own engines for its Datsun line of cars. In 1953, British-built Austins were assembled and sold, but by 1955, the Austin A50 – completely assembled by Nissan and featuring a slightly larger body with 1489 cc engine – was on the market in Japan. Nissan produced 20,855 Austins between 1953-59.

=== 1939–1958: War years and post-war years ===
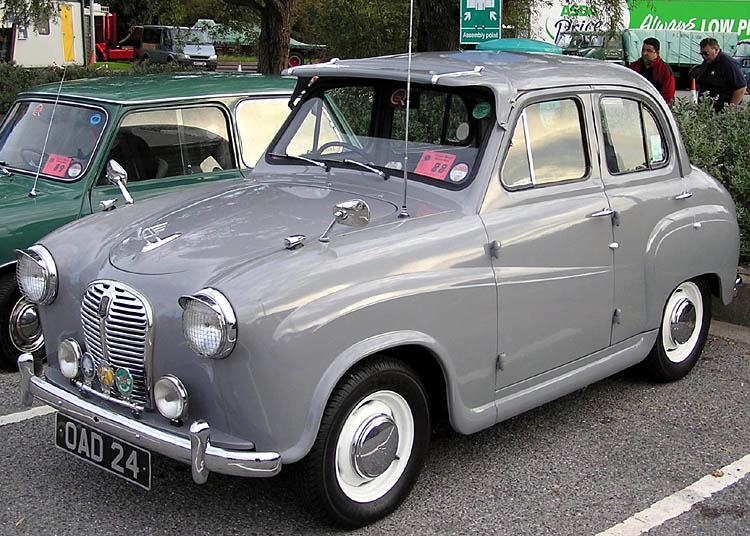
1954 A30

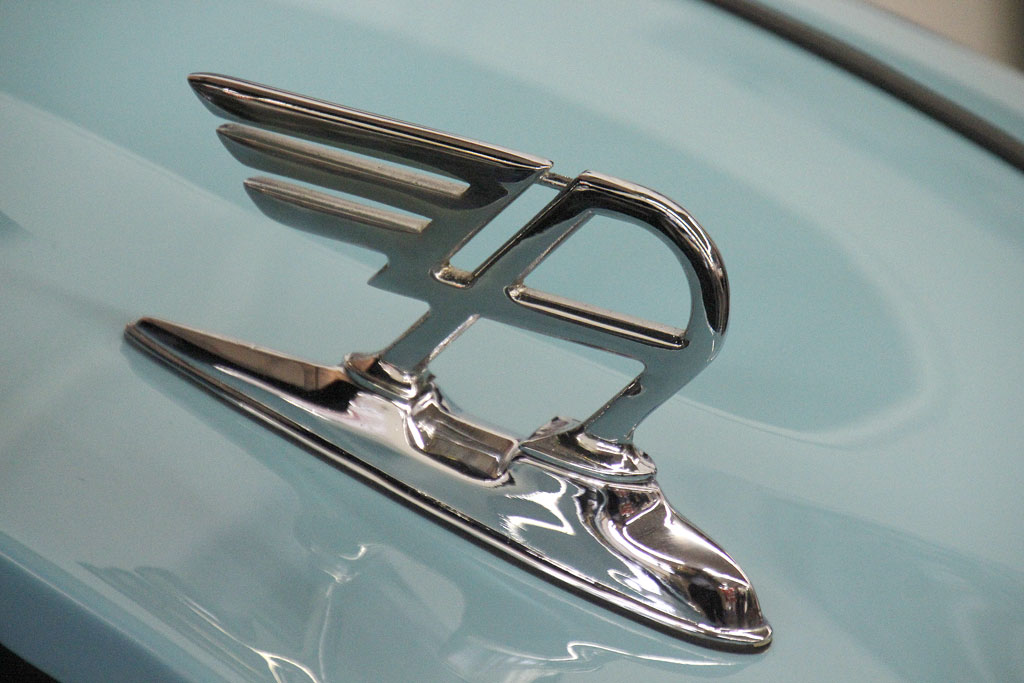
The "winged-A" at the front of the bonnet of new mainstream Austin models between 1947 and 1956 recalled the "flying-B" on post-war Bentley models

During the Second World War Austin continued building cars but also made trucks and aircraft, including Short Stirling and Avro Lancaster bombers.

The post-war car range was announced in 1944, and production started in 1945. The immediate post-war range was mainly similar to that of the late 1930s but did include the 16 hp, significant for having the company's first overhead valve engine.

Austin J40 pedal cars were manufactured during this era.

==== Austin of England ====
From late 1950 to mid-1952 products, brochures and advertisements displayed in flowing script Austin of England as if in response to Morris' Nuffield Organization. It fell out of use with the financial merger with Morris in BMC.

==== BMC ====
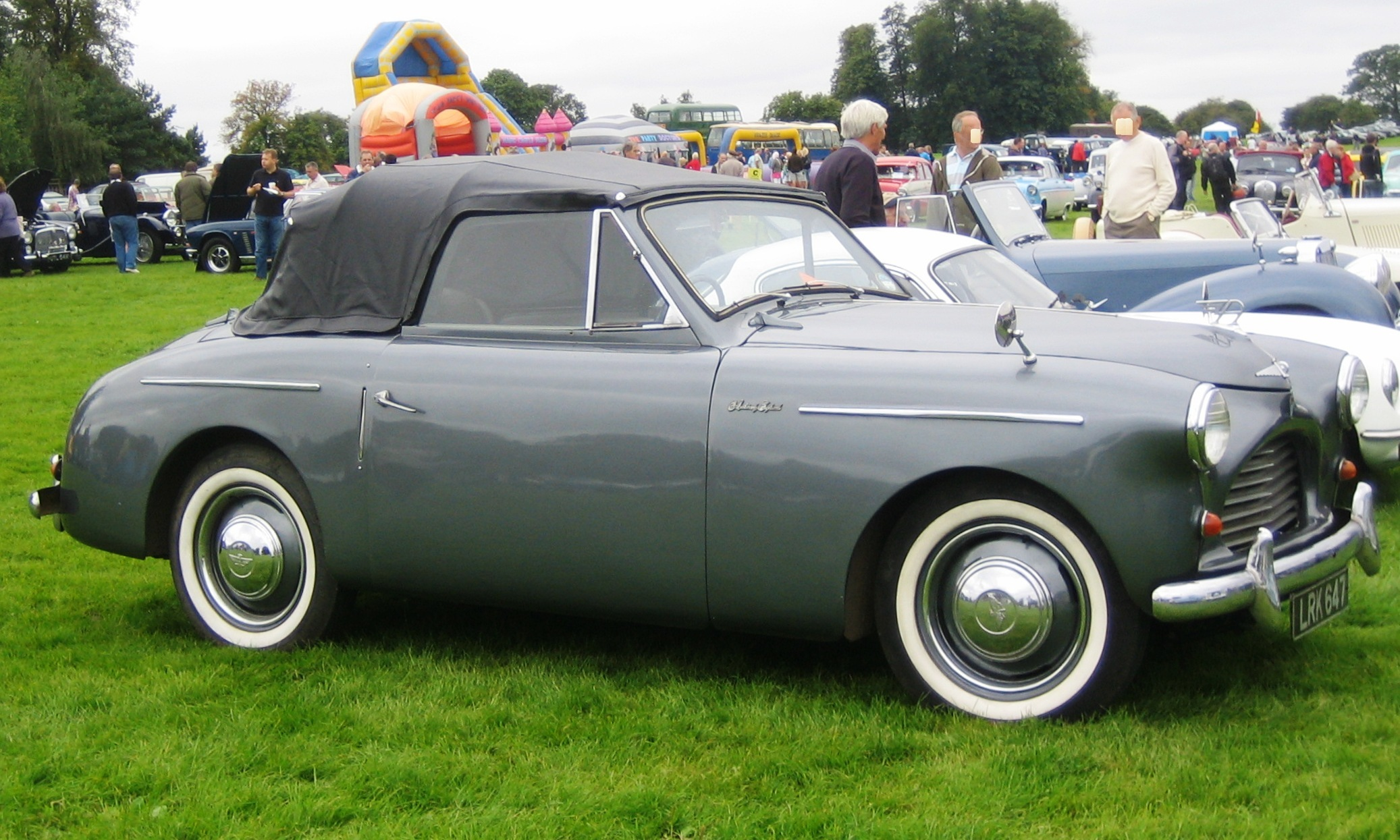
A40 Sports, ca 1951

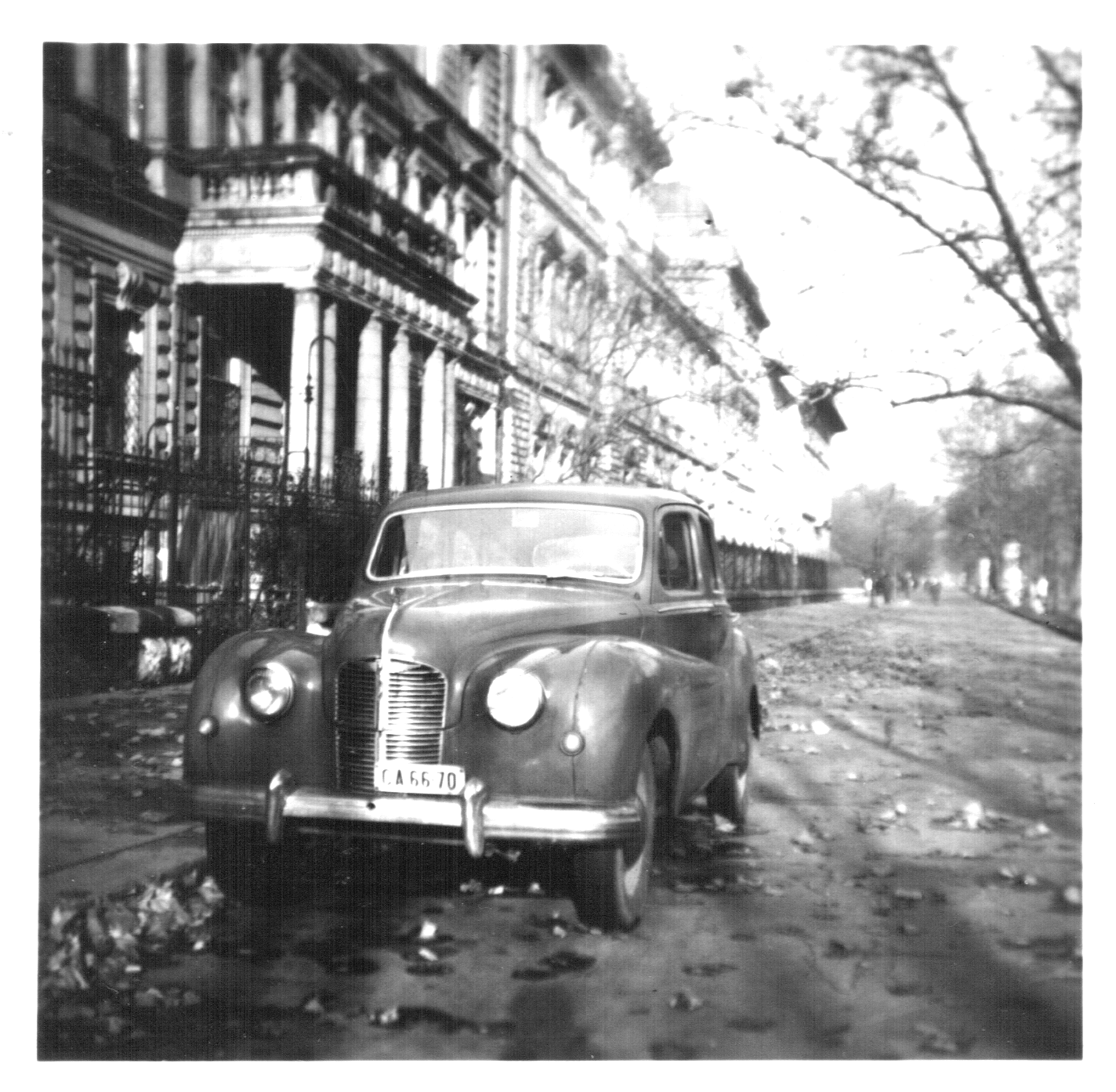
Austin on Blvd Népköztársaság (today Andrássy avenue) in Budapest, end of 1950s

In 1952, The Austin Motor Company Limited merged ownership, but not identity, with long-term rival Morris Motors Limited, becoming The British Motor Corporation Limited, with Leonard Lord in charge. William Morris was first chairman but soon retired. Lord, who had stormed out of Morris declaring he would "take Cowley apart brick by brick", ensured Austin was the dominant partner and its (more recently designed OHV) engines were adopted for most of the cars. Various models followed the Morris policy and became badge-engineered versions of each other.

==== Austin-Healey ====
In 1952, Austin made a deal with Donald Healey leading to a new marque, Austin-Healey, and a range of sports cars.

=== 1959–1969: Era of revolution ===
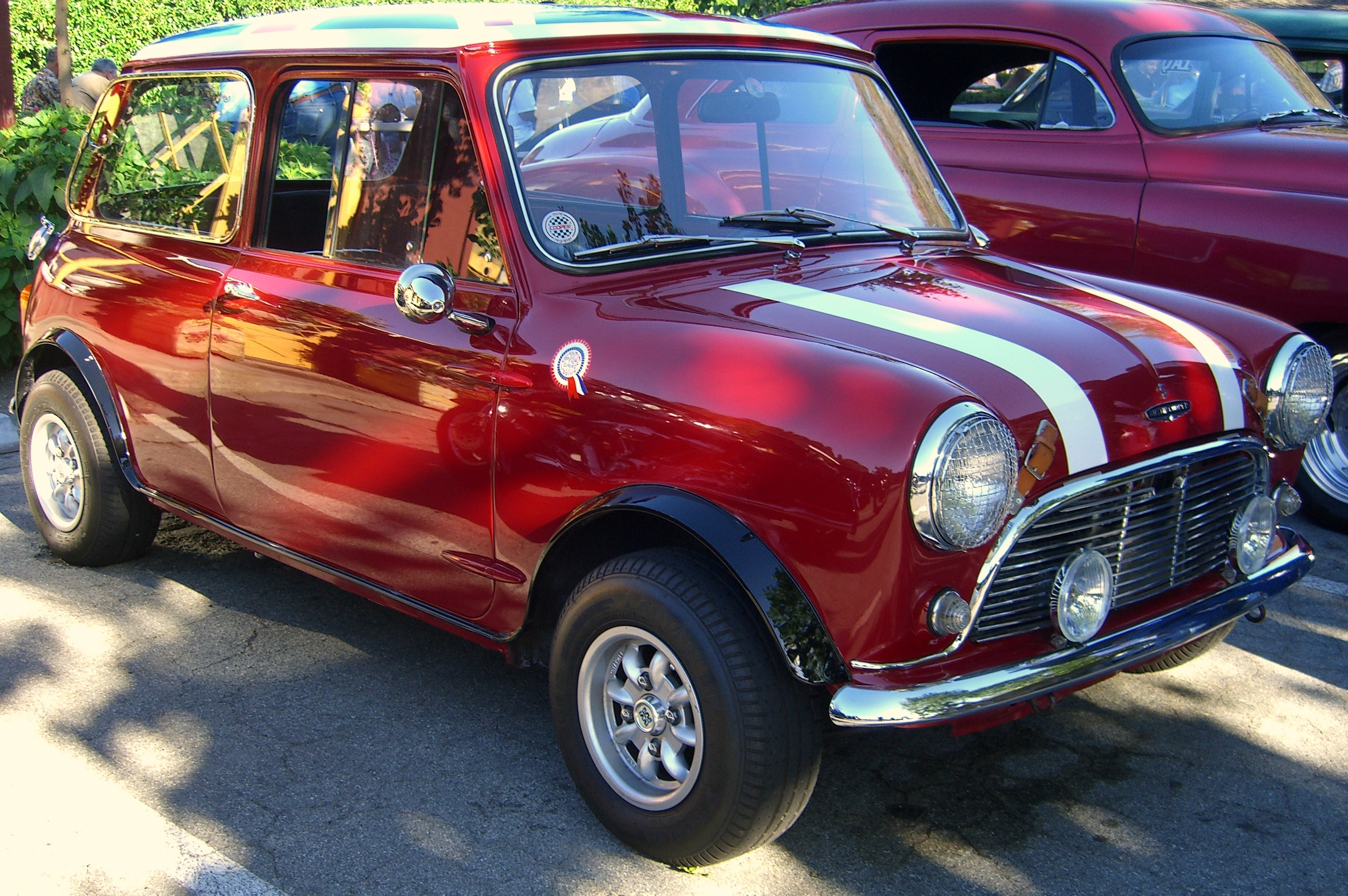
1963 Mini Cooper S

With the threat to fuel supplies resulting from the 1956 Suez Crisis, Lord asked Alec Issigonis, who had been with Morris from 1936 to 1952, to design a small car; the result was the revolutionary Mini, launched in 1959. The Austin version was initially called the Austin Seven, but Morris' Mini Minor name caught the public imagination and the Morris version outsold its Austin twin, so the Austin's name was changed to Mini to follow suit. In 1970, British Leyland dropped the separate Austin and Morris branding of the Mini, and it was subsequently simply "Mini", under the Austin Morris division of BLMC.

The principle of a transverse engine with gearbox in the sump and driving the front wheels was applied to larger cars, beginning with the 1100 of 1963, (although the Morris-badged version was launched 13 months earlier than the Austin, in August 1962), the 1800 of 1964 and the Maxi of 1969. This meant that BMC had spent 10 years developing a new range of front-drive, transverse-engined models, while most competitors had only just started to make such changes.

The big exception to this was the Austin 3-litre. Launched in 1968, it was a rear-wheel drive large car, but it shared the central section of the 1800. It was a sales disaster, with fewer than 10,000 examples being made.

BMC was the first British manufacturer to move into front-wheel drive so comprehensively. Ford did not launch its first front-drive model until 1976 (in Britain), Ford-Germany in 1962 with the Taunus 12M(P4), while Vauxhall's first front-drive model was launched in 1979 and Chrysler UK's first such car was launched in 1975. Front-wheel drive was popular elsewhere in Europe, however, with Renault, Citroen and Simca all using the system at the same time or before BMC. East Germany's Trabant used the system from 1958.

In September 1965 BMC completed the purchase of its major supplier, Pressed Steel. Twelve months later it completed the purchase of Jaguar and in December 1966 changed its name from BMC to BMH, British Motor Holdings Limited. In early 1968 under government pressure BMH merged with Leyland Motors Limited and Austin became a part of the large British Leyland Motor Corporation (BLMC) combine.

=== 1970–1979: Era of turbulence ===
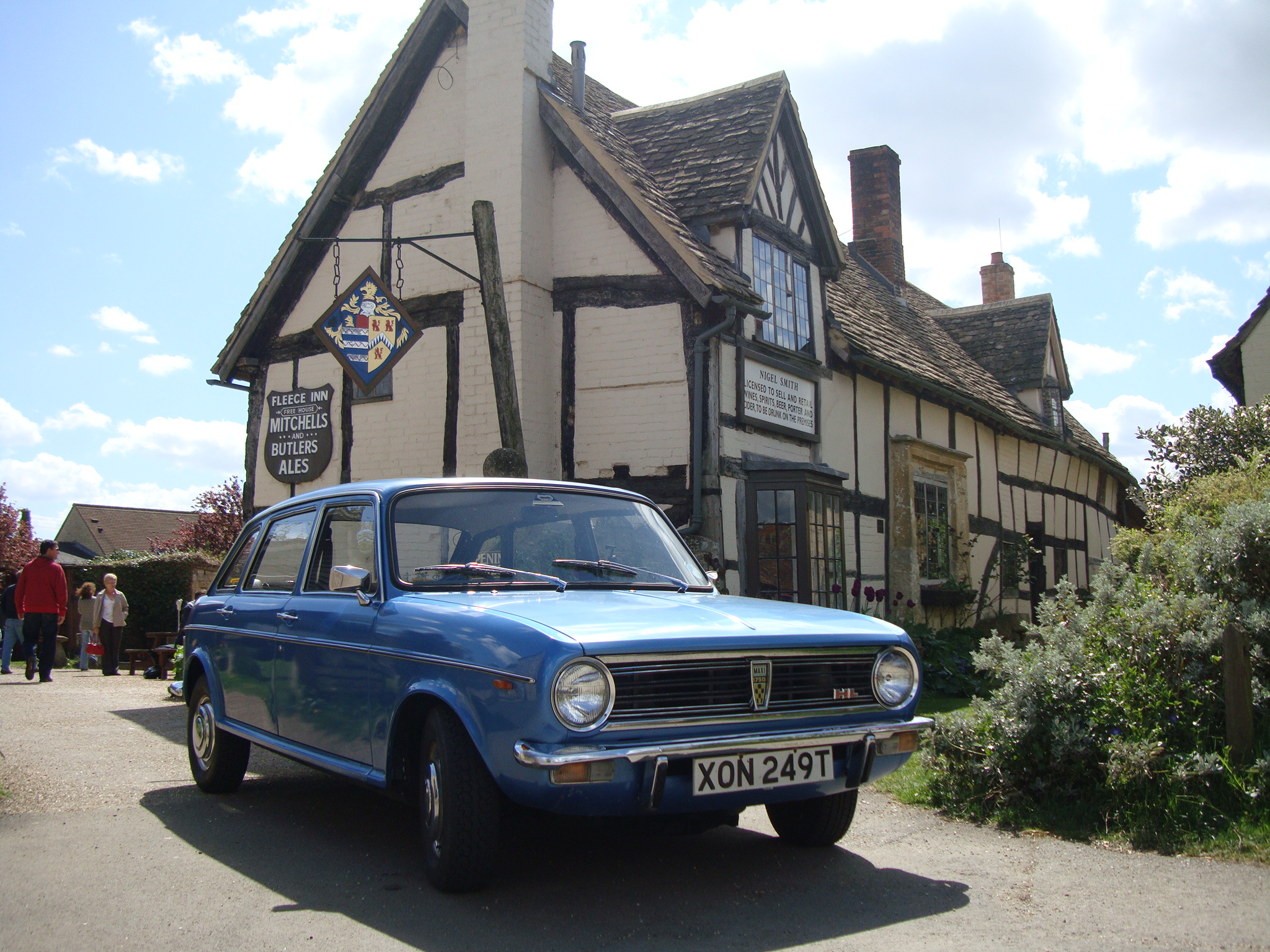
1979 Maxi

One of Austin's new models of this era was the 1973 Allegro, successor to the 1100/1300 ranges. It was criticised for its bulbous styling which earned it the nickname "Flying pig" as well as the doubtful build quality and indifferent reliability. It was still a strong seller in Britain, although not as successful as its predecessor.

The wedge-shaped 18/22 series was launched as an Austin, a Morris and a more upmarket Wolseley in 1975. But within six months, it was rechristened the Princess and wore none of the previous marque badges, becoming a marque in its own right, under the Austin Morris division of British Leyland that had been virtually nationalised in 1975.

It was upgraded at the end of 1981 to become the Austin Ambassador (and gaining a hatchback) but by that time there was little that could be done to disguise the age of the design, and it was too late to make much of an impact on sales.

By the end of the 1970s, the future of Austin and the rest of British Leyland (now known as BL) was looking bleak.

=== 1980–1989: Austin Rover era ===
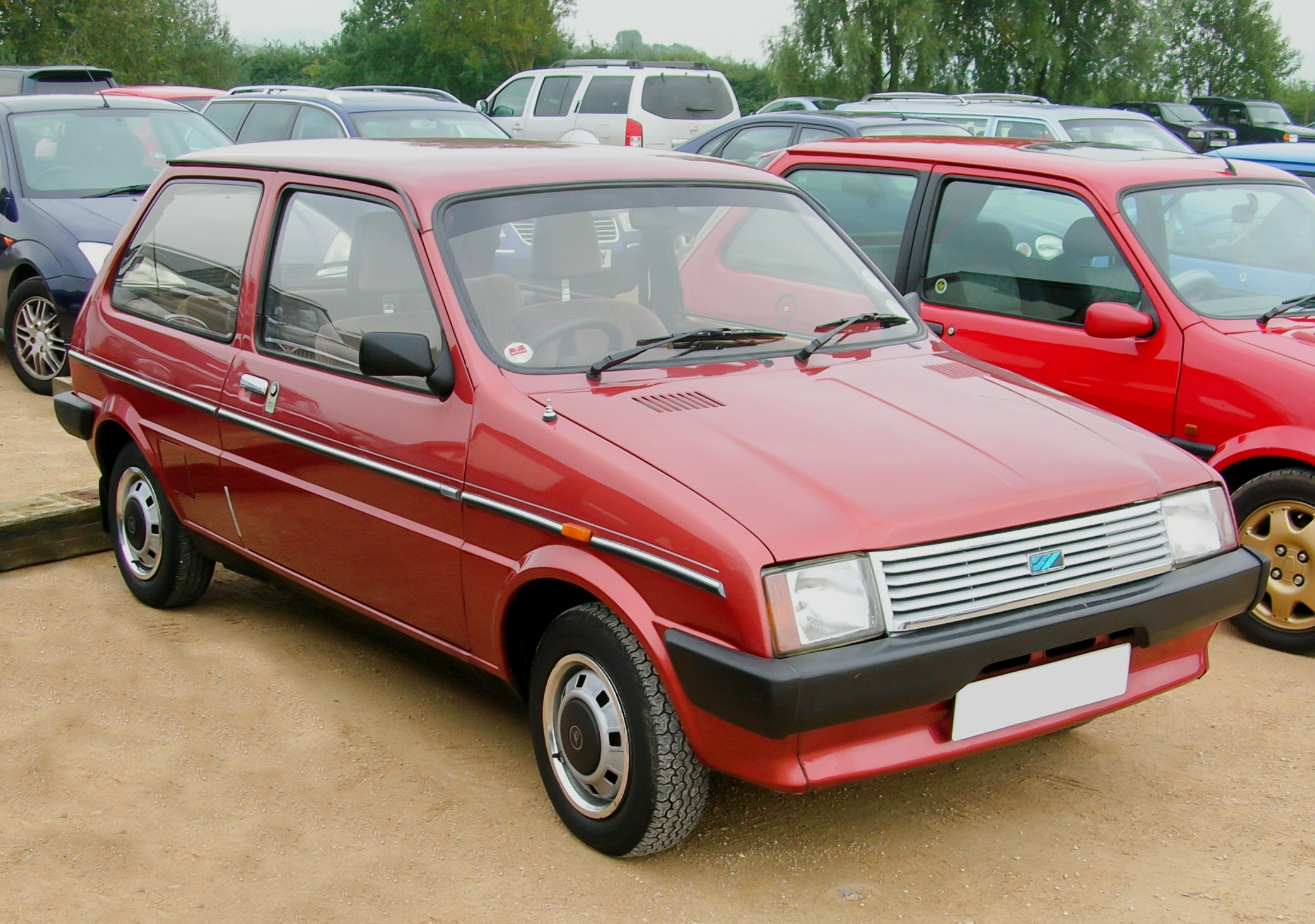
Metro, launched in 1980

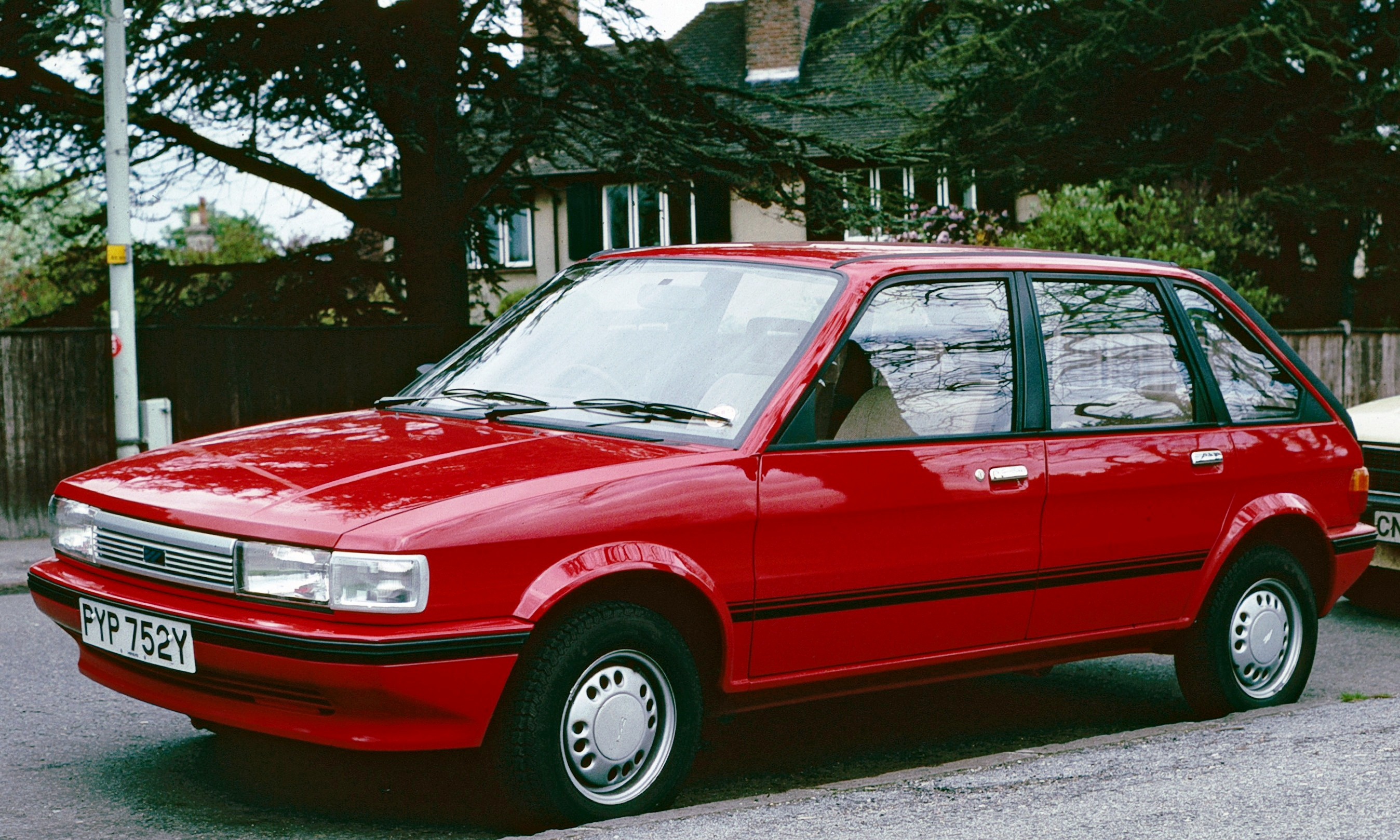
Maestro, launched in 1983

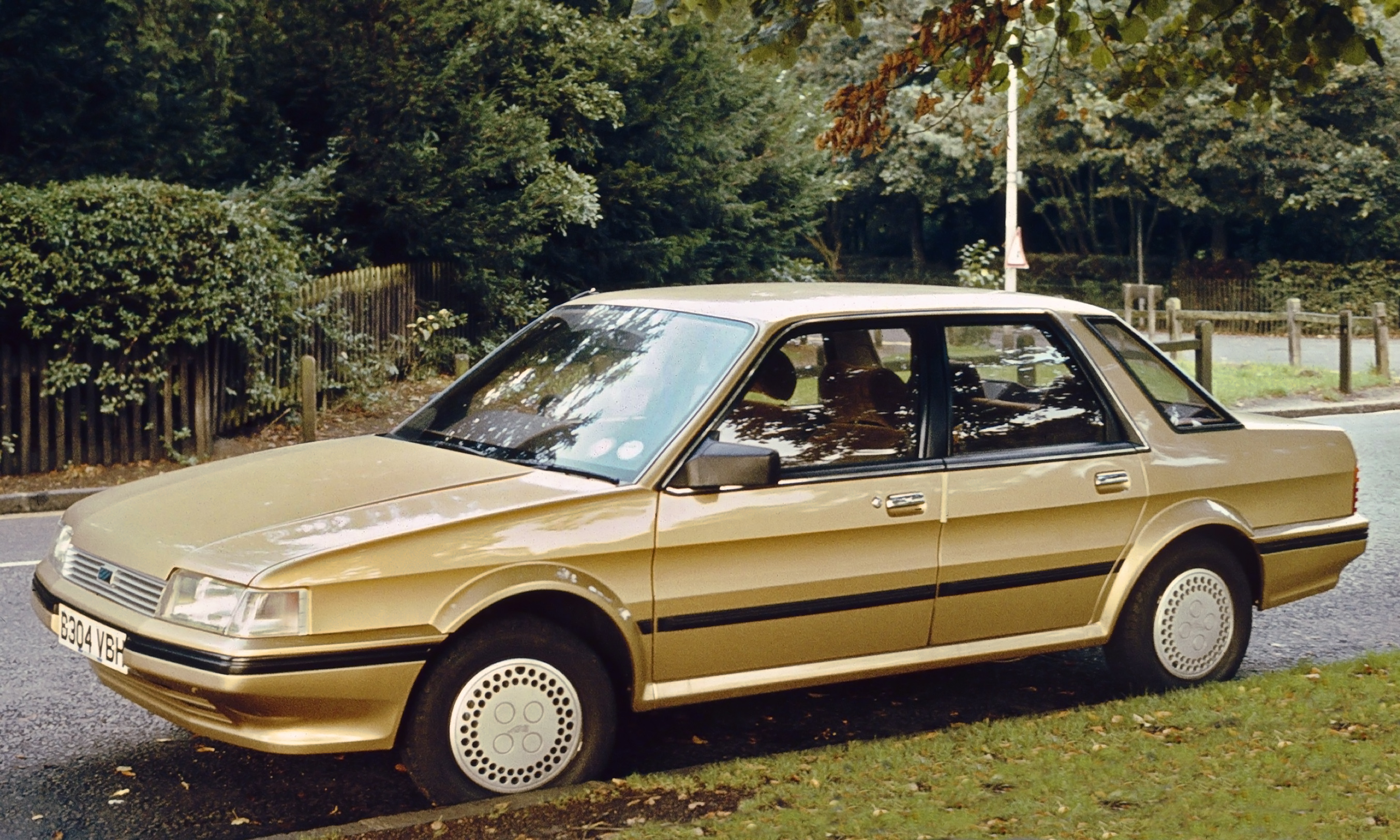
Montego, launched in 1984

The Austin Metro, launched in October 1980, was heralded as the saviour of Austin Motor Company and the whole BL combine. Twenty-one years after the launch of the Mini, it gave BL a much-needed modern supermini to compete with the recently launched likes of the Ford Fiesta, Vauxhall Nova, VW Polo and Renault 5. It was an instant hit with buyers and was one of the most popular British cars of the 1980s. It was intended as a replacement for the Mini but the Mini went on to outlast it. It was facelifted in October 1984 and gained a 5-door version.

In 1982, most of the car division of the by now somewhat shrunken British Leyland (BL) company was rebranded as the Austin Rover Group, with Austin acting as the "budget" and mainstream marque to Rover's more luxurious models. The MG badge was revived for sporty versions of the Austin models, of which the MG Metro 1300 was the first. The Morris and Triumph marques were axed in 1984.

Austin revitalised its entry into the small family-car market in March 1983 with the launch of its all-new Maestro, a spacious five-door hatchback that replaced the elderly Allegro and Maxi and was popular in the early years of its production life, although sales had started to dip dramatically by the end of the decade.

April 1984 saw the introduction of the Maestro-derived Montego saloon, successor to the Morris Ital. The new car received praise for its interior space and comfort as well as its handling, but early build-quality problems took time to overcome. The spacious estate version, launched six months later, was one of the most popular load carriers in Britain for several years after its launch.

In 1986, Austin Rover's holding company BL plc became Rover Group plc and was privatised by selling it to British Aerospace (BAe) in 1988.

Plans to replace the Metro with a radical new model, based on the ECV3 research vehicle and aiming for 100 mpg, led to the Austin AR6 of 1984–86, with several prototypes tested and production expected to start before the end of the decade. The desire to lose the Austin name and take Rover "upmarket" led to this project's demise in early 1987.

In 1988, the Austin badge was phased out and Austin Rover became the Rover Group from the following year. The Austin cars continued to be manufactured, although they ceased to be Austins. They became "marque-less" in their home market with bonnet badges the same shape as the Rover longship badge but without "Rover" written on them. Instead any badging just showed the model of the car: a Montego of this era, for instance, would have a grille badge simply saying "Montego", while the rear badges just said "Montego" and the engine size/trim level. A revamped Metro was launched in May 1990 and got the new K-series engine. It then became the Rover Metro.

Despite sales of both the Maestro and Montego being in decline by 1990, these ranges continued in production until 1994 and never wore a Rover badge on their bonnets in Britain. They were, however, sometimes referred to as "Rovers" in the press and elsewhere. Their place in the Rover range was gradually filled by a new generation of Rover models.

=== Revival ===
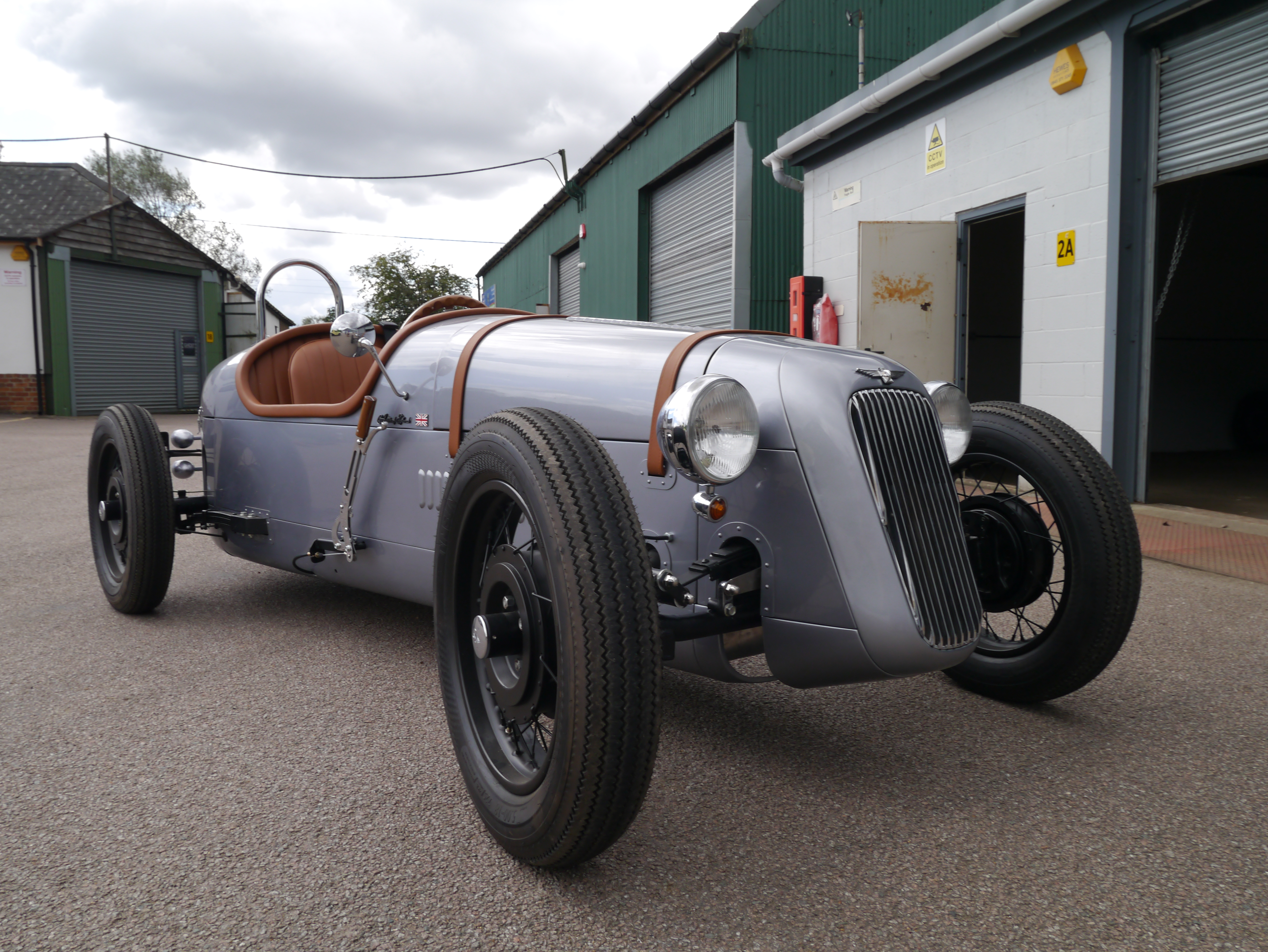
Austin Arrow electric 1 seater, 2023

The rights to the Austin name passed to British Aerospace and then to BMW when each bought the Rover Group. The rights were subsequently sold to MG Rover, created when BMW sold the business. Following MG Rover's collapse and sale, Nanjing Automobile Group owned the Austin name and Austin's historic assembly plant in Longbridge. At the Nanjing International Exhibition in May 2006, Nanjing announced it might use the Austin name on some of the revived MG Rover models, at least in the Chinese market. Nanjing Automobile Group itself later merged with SAIC Motor.

In 2012, a new "Austin Motor Company" was registered by former Longbridge worker Steve Morgan. Morgan had no rights to the brand itself and stated that he had no intention to trade, but rather registered the name as an effort to preserve the memory of the company. The company was dissolved in 2014.

In 2015, the "Austin Motor Company", alongside the 1930's "Flying A" logo was registered by British Engineer John Stubbs, owner of specialist suspension company Black Art Designs. By 2021, a prototype electric vehicle named the Austin Arrow had been revealed and was seeking investors, with a supposed release date around late 2022. The revived Austin Motor Company subsequently revealed the Arrow 2, a two seater version of the Arrow, alongside announcing an electric commercial Austin van to be released approximately 18-24 months after the launch of the Arrow 1 and 2.

By May 2023, a production line had been set up by MJP MOTORS based in Rajkot, India. The Austin Arrow subsequently entered production in October 2023.

In July 2025, ex-McLaren Automotive, Automobili Lamborghini SpA and Group Lotus veteran senior director, Nigel Gordon-Stewart was appointed as Chairman and CEO of the Austin Motor Company Limited.

== Plant ==
Austin started his business in an abandoned print works at Longbridge, Birmingham. Due to its strategic advantages over Morris's Cowley plant, Longbridge became British Leyland's main factory in the early 1970s. Following the Austin marque's discontinuance in 1987, Rover and MG continued to use the plant. The collapse of MG Rover meant it was not used from 2005 until MG production resumed from 2008 until 2016. The plant is currently leased by SAIC as a research and development facility for its MG Motor subsidiary.

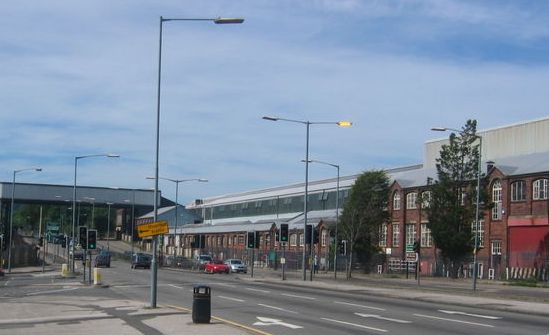
Austin's Longbridge plant

== Models ==
=== Cars ===
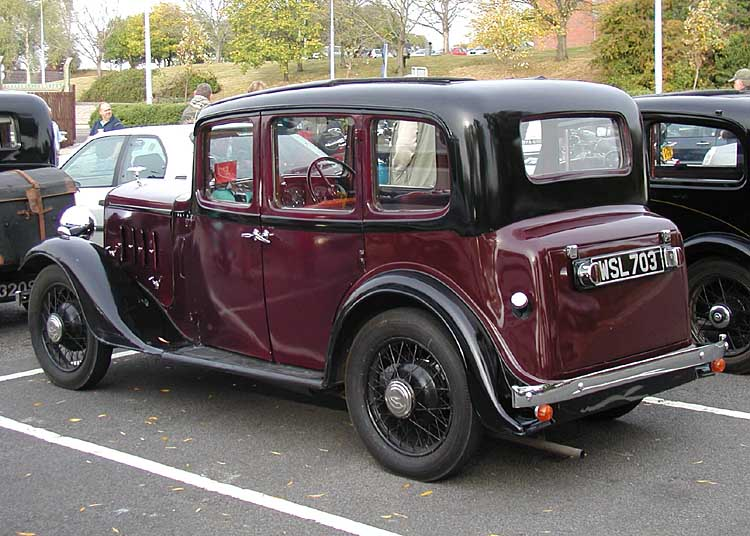
1935 Light 12/6 with Ascot body

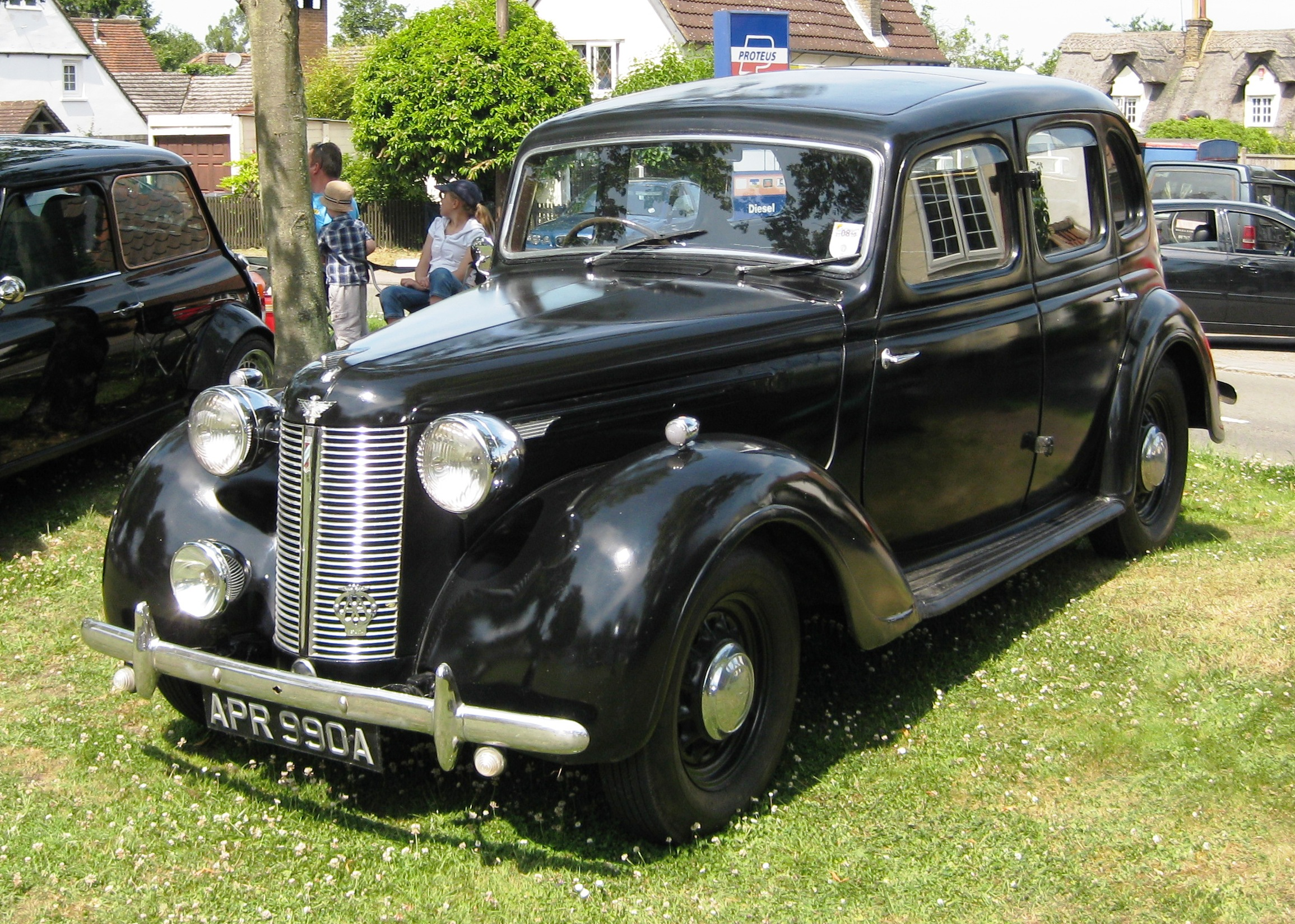
1946 12 (1465cc)

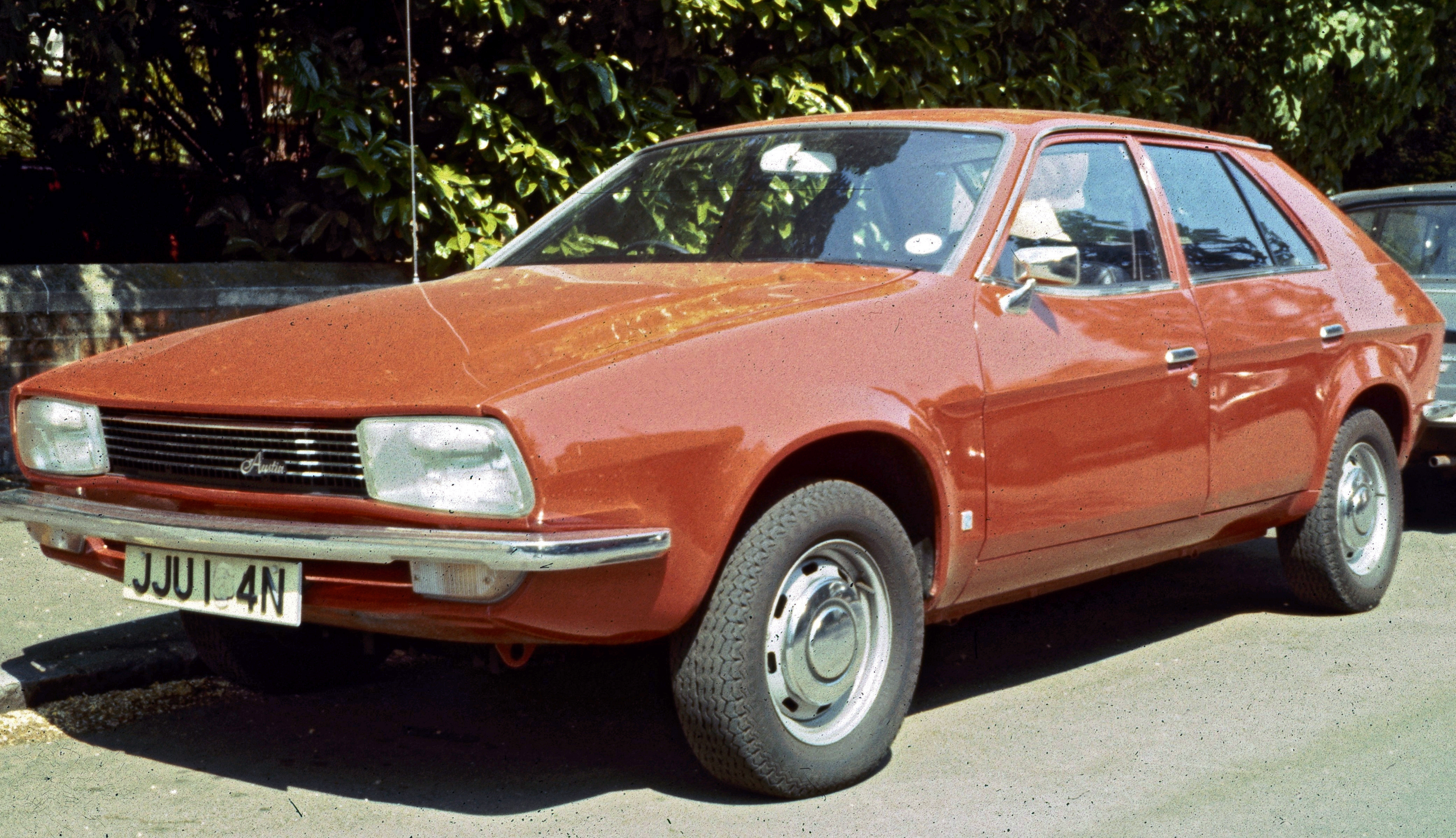
1975 1800 (ADO71)

- Small cars
  - 1910–1911 Austin 7 hp
  - 1922–1939 Austin 7
  - 1959–1961 Seven, as BMC
  - 1961–1969 Mini, as BMC
  - 1980–1990 Metro, as Austin Rover
- Small family cars
  - 1911–1915 Austin 10 hp
  - 1932–1947 Austin 10
  - 1939–1947 Austin 8
  - 1951–1956 A30
  - 1956–1959 A35
  - 1956–1962 A35 Countryman
  - 1954–1961 Nash Metropolitan/Austin Metropolitan
  - 1958–1961 A40 Farina Mk I
  - 1961–1967 A40 Farina Mk II
  - 1963–1974 1100
  - 1967–1974 1300
  - 1973–1983 Allegro
  - 1983–1994 Maestro

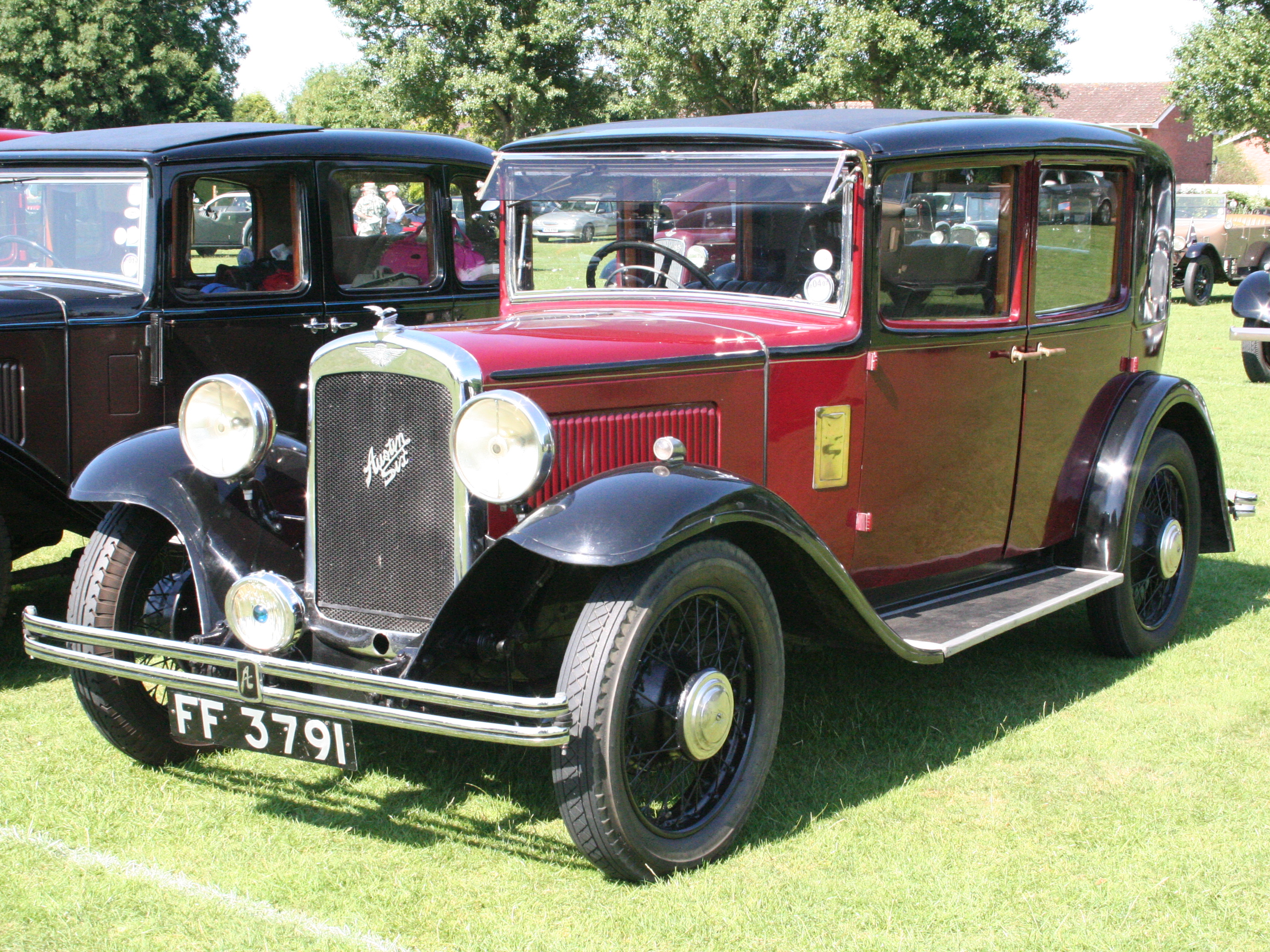
Sixteen Westminster saloon 1932

- Large family cars
  - 1913–1914 Austin 15 hp
  - 1922–1940 Austin "Heavy" 12
  - 1927–1938 Austin 16 (16/18)
  - 1931–1936 Austin "Light" 12/6
  - 1933–1939 Austin "Light" 12/4
  - 1937–1939 Austin 14
  - 1938–1939 Austin 18
  - 1939–1947 Austin 12
  - 1945–1949 Austin 16 hp
  - 1947–1952 A40 Devon/Dorset
  - 1948–1950 A70 Hampshire
  - 1950–1954 A70 Hereford
  - 1952–1954 A40 Somerset
  - 1954–1958 A40/A50/A55 Cambridge
  - 1954–1959 A90/A95/A105 Westminster
  - 1959–1961 A55 Cambridge Mk2
  - 1959–1961 A99 Westminster
  - 1961–1969 A60 Cambridge
  - 1961–1968 A110 Westminster
  - 1964–1975 1800/2200 (ADO17)
  - 1967–1971 3-Litre
  - 1969–1981 Maxi
  - 1975–1975 1800/2200 (ADO71)
  - 1982–1984 Ambassador
  - 1984–1994 Montego

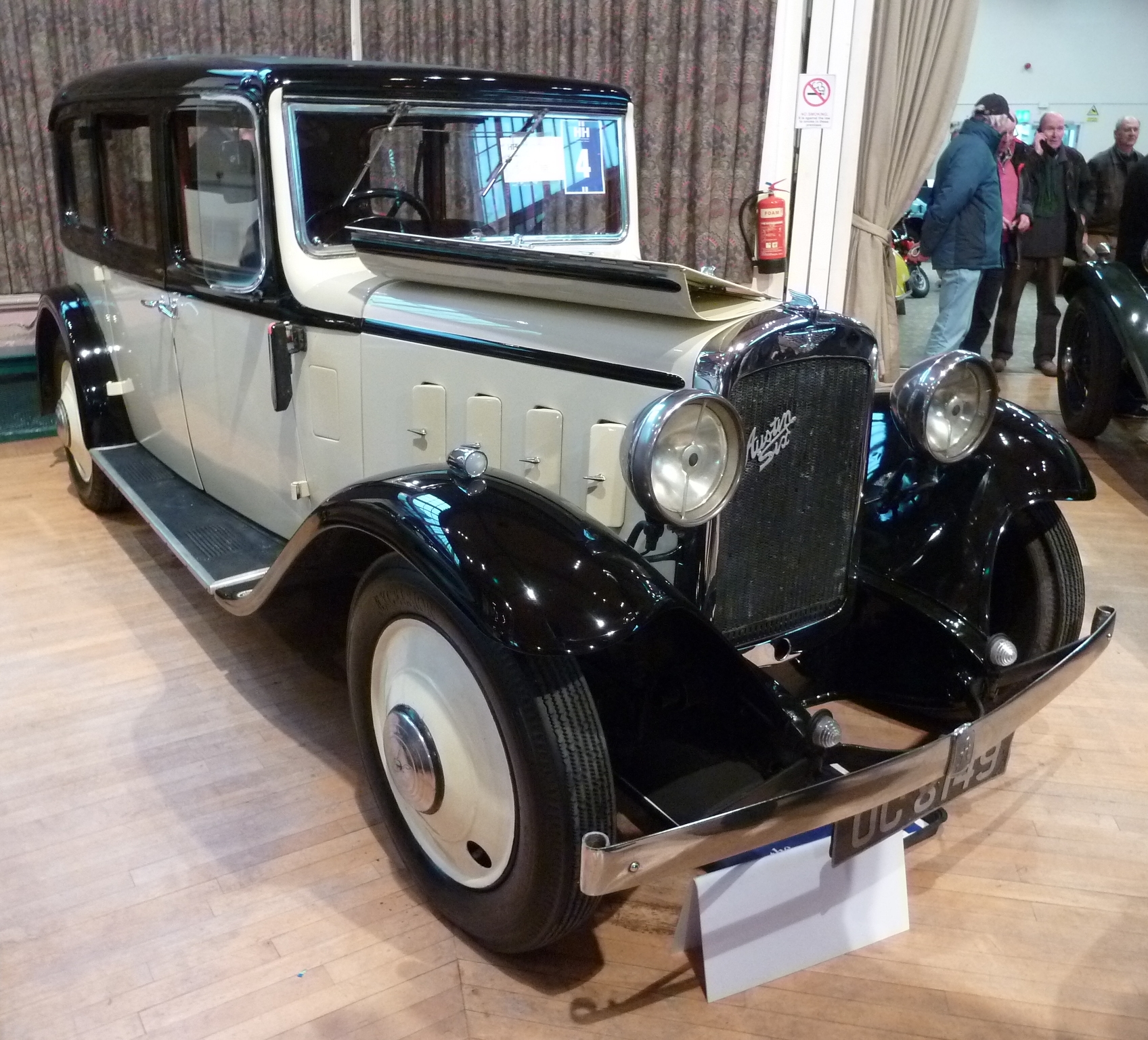
Sixteen Carlton 7-seater 1934

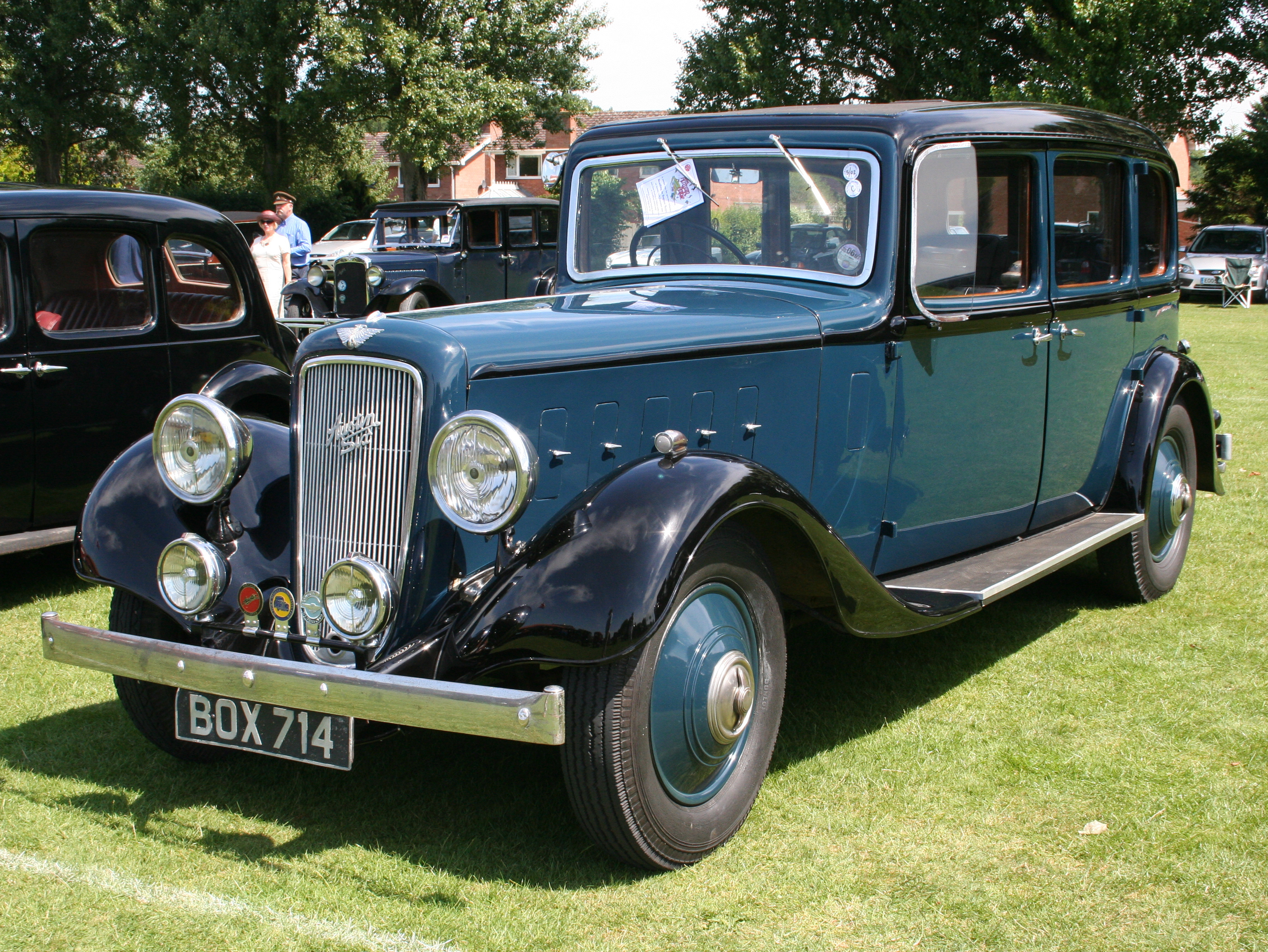
Twenty Mayfair 1936

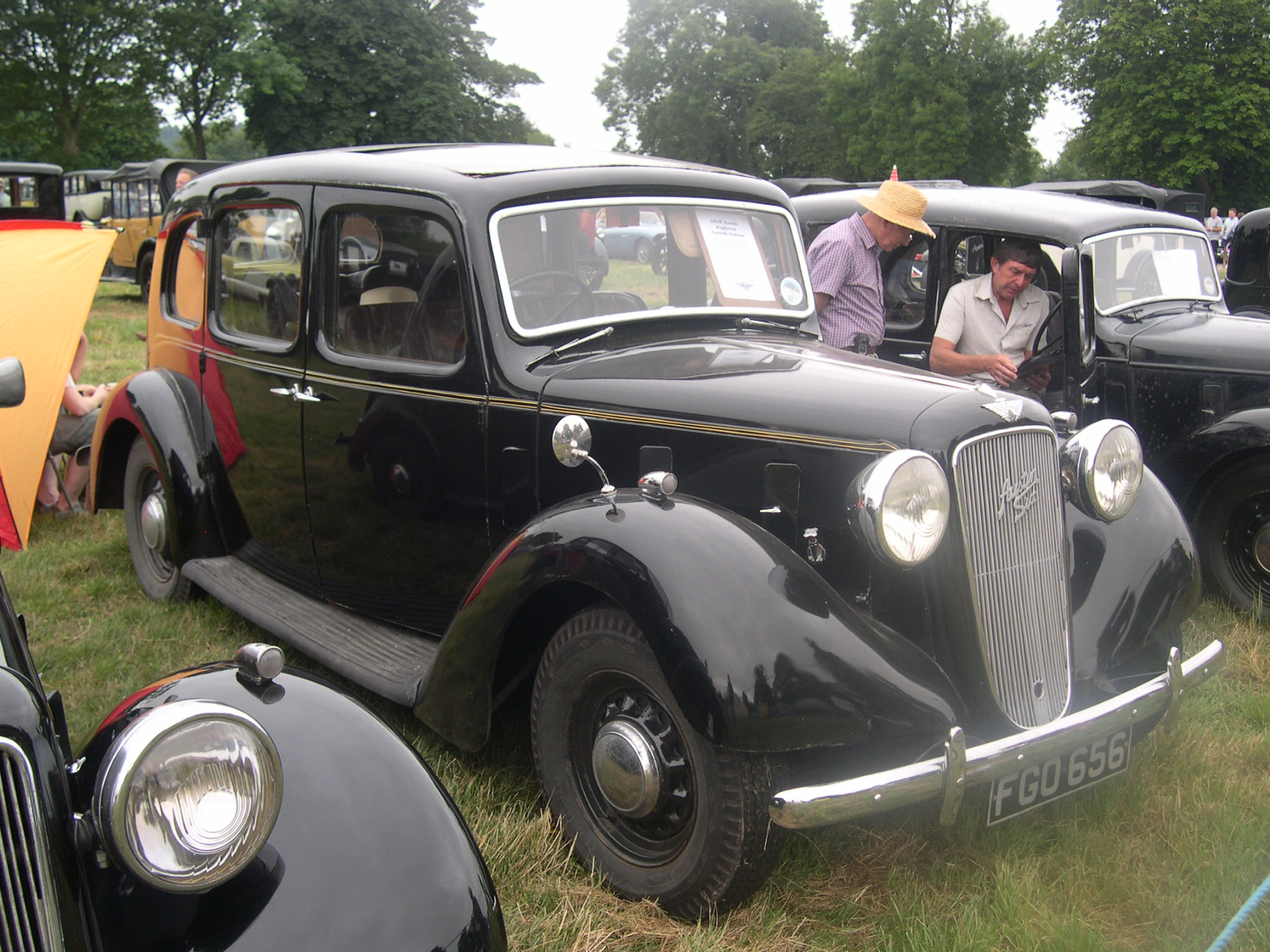
Eighteen Norfolk 1938

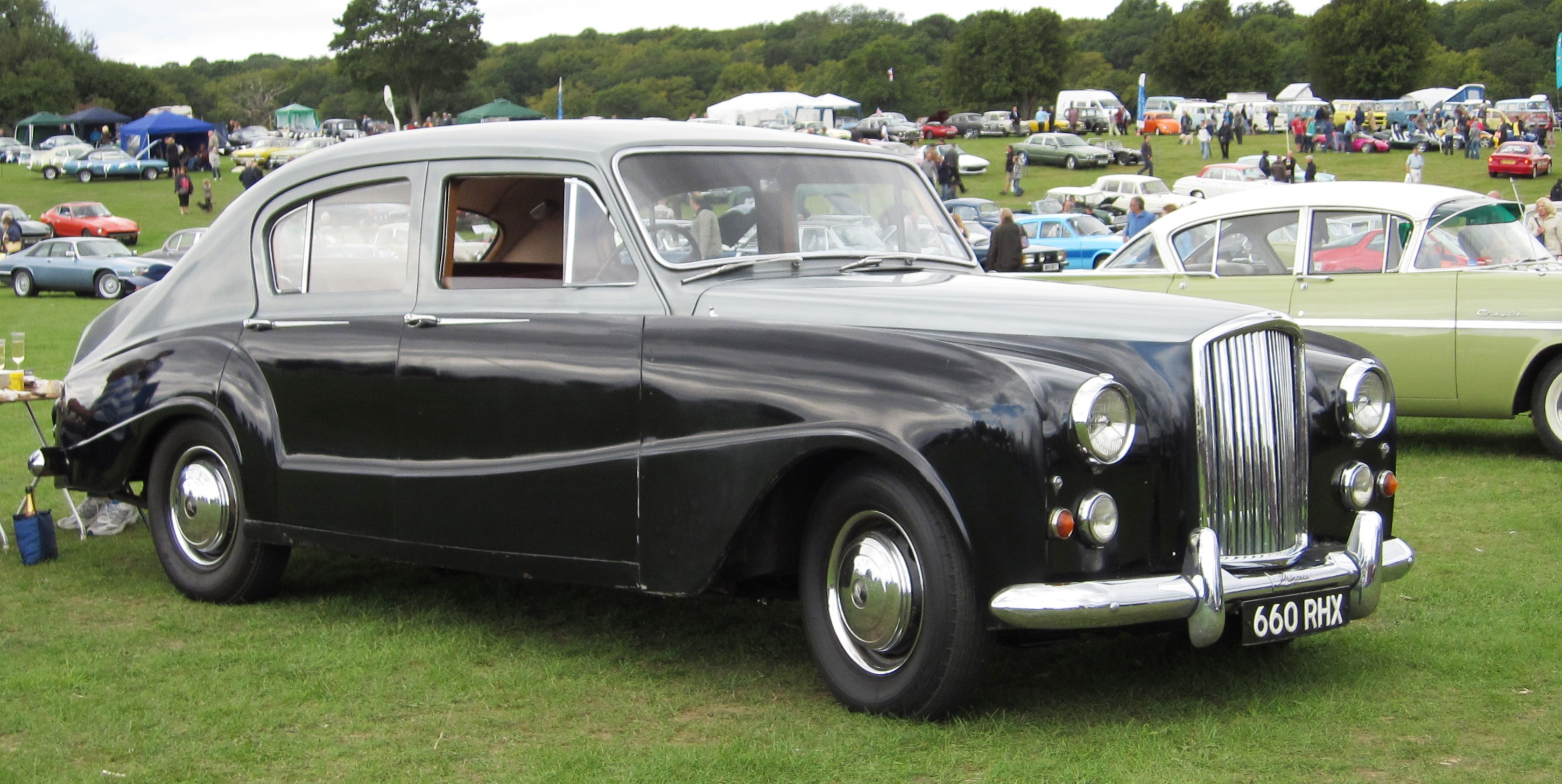
Princess IV 1956

- Large cars
  - 1906–1907 Austin 25/30
  - 1906–1907 Austin 15/20
  - 1907–1913 Austin 18/24
  - 1908–1913 Austin 40 hp
  - 1908–1910 Austin 60 hp 6-cylinder
  - 1910–1913 Austin 50 hp 6-cylinder
  - 1912–1918 Austin 20 hp
  - 1914–1916 Austin 30 hp
  - 1919–1938 Austin Twenty
  - 1938–1939 Austin Twenty Eight (28/6)
  - 1947–1954 A110/A125 Sheerline
  - 1946–1956 A120 Princess
  - 1947–1956 A135 Princess
  - 1956–1959 Princess IV
- Limousines and Landaulettes
  - 1906–1907 Austin 25/30
  - 1906–1907 Austin 15/20
  - 1907–1913 Austin 18/24
  - 1908–1913 Austin 40 hp
  - 1908–1910 Austin 60 hp 6-cylinder
  - 1910–1913 Austin 50 hp 6-cylinder
  - 1912–1918 Austin 20 hp
  - 1914–1916 Austin 30 hp
  - 1919–1938 Austin Twenty
  - 1927–1938 Austin 16 (16/18)
  - 1938–1939 Austin 18
  - 1938–1939 Austin Twenty Eight
  - 1947–1954 A110/A125 Sheerline
  - 1946–1956 A120 Princess
  - 1947–1956 A135 Princess
  - 1956–1959 Princess IV
- Sports cars
  - 1920–1923 Austin Twenty Sports Tourer
  - 1948–1950 A90 Atlantic Convertible
  - 1949–1952 A90 Atlantic Sports Saloon
  - 1950–1953 A40 Sports
  - 1953–1956 Austin-Healey 100
  - 1956–1959 Austin-Healey 100-6
  - 1959–1967 Austin-Healey 3000
  - 1958–1970 Austin-Healey Sprite
  - 1971 Austin Sprite
- Australian Austin cars
  - 1958–1962 Austin Lancer
  - 1962–1966 Austin Freeway
  - 1970–1973 Austin Kimberley/Tasman

=== Revival cars ===
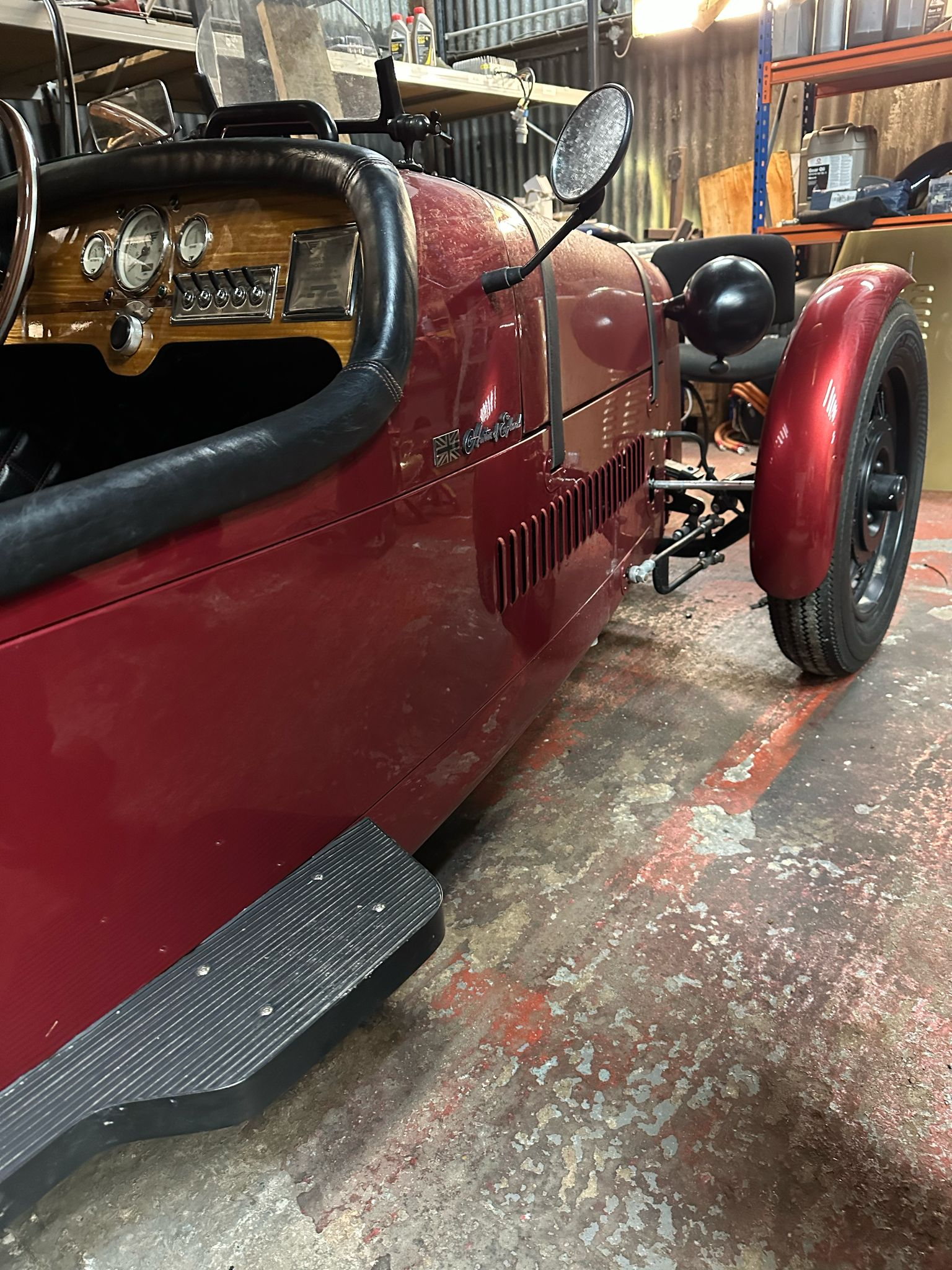
2025 Austin Arrow

- Heritage range
  - 2025–present Austin Arrow Heavy quadricycle (L7e)

=== Military vehicles ===
- Austin Armoured Car - First World War AFV
- "Car, Light Utility 4 x 2" – Utility ("Tilly") vehicle version of Austin Ten produced during Second World War
- Austin K2
  - Austin K2/Y – Second World War military ambulance
  - Austin K2 fire engine, also used by National Fire Service and post war as ATV
- Austin K4 – truck
- Austin K5 – General Service truck and artillery carrier
- Austin K6
- 1958–1967 Austin Gipsy
- Austin Champ
- c. 1968 Austin Ant

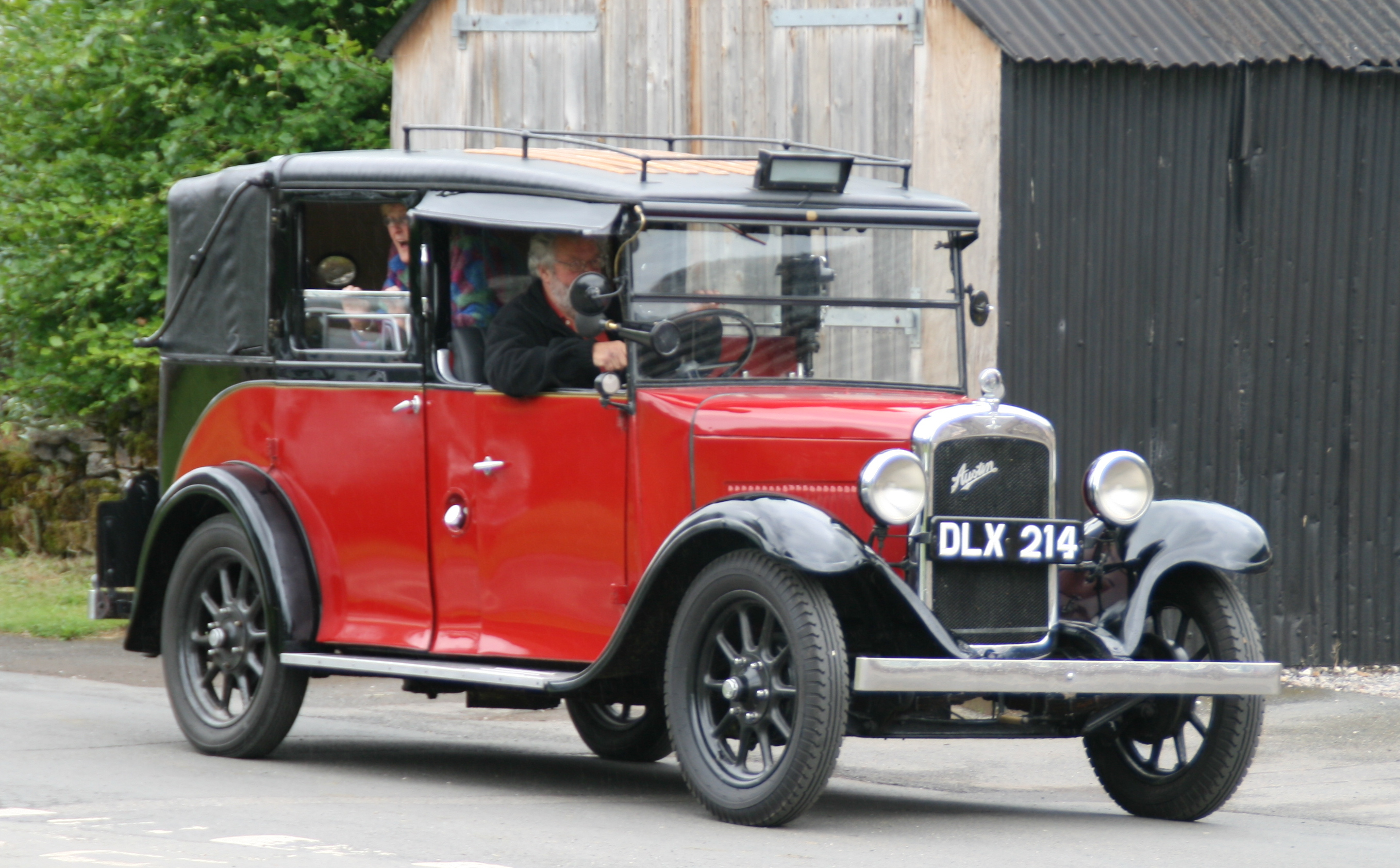
1937 low-loader

=== London taxis ===
- 1929–1934 Austin 12 Taxicab High Lot
- 1934–1939 Austin 12 Taxicab Low Loader
- 1938–1939 Austin 12 Taxicab Flash Lot
- 1948–1958 Austin FX3
- 1958–1997 Austin FX4—London taxi

=== Ambulances ===
- LD3
- WWII Austin K2/Y

=== Commercial vehicles ===
For a list see : Austin commercial vehicles

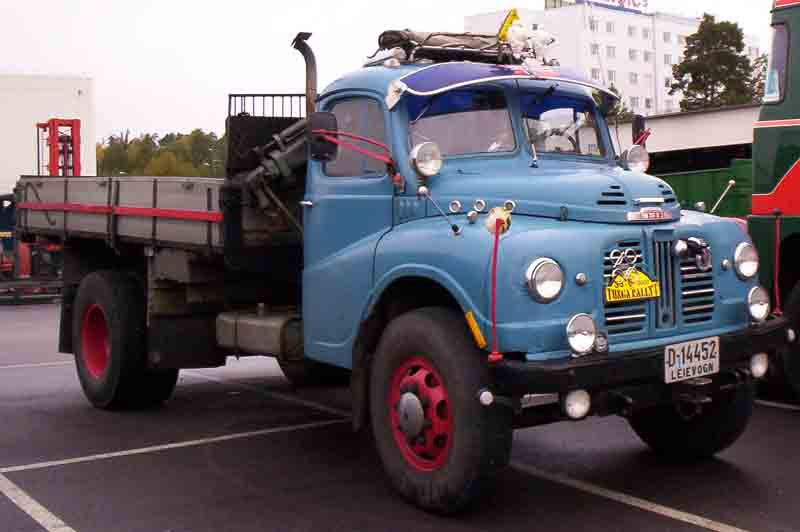
LWB truck 1954

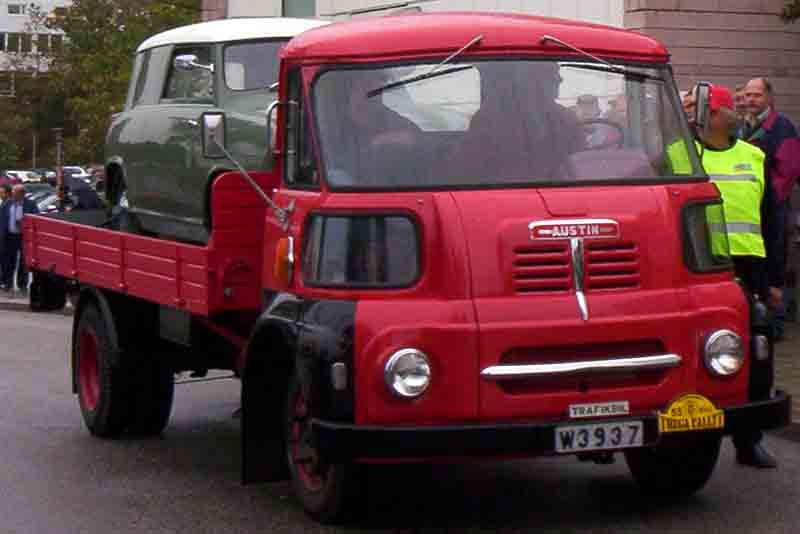
A200FT truck 1962

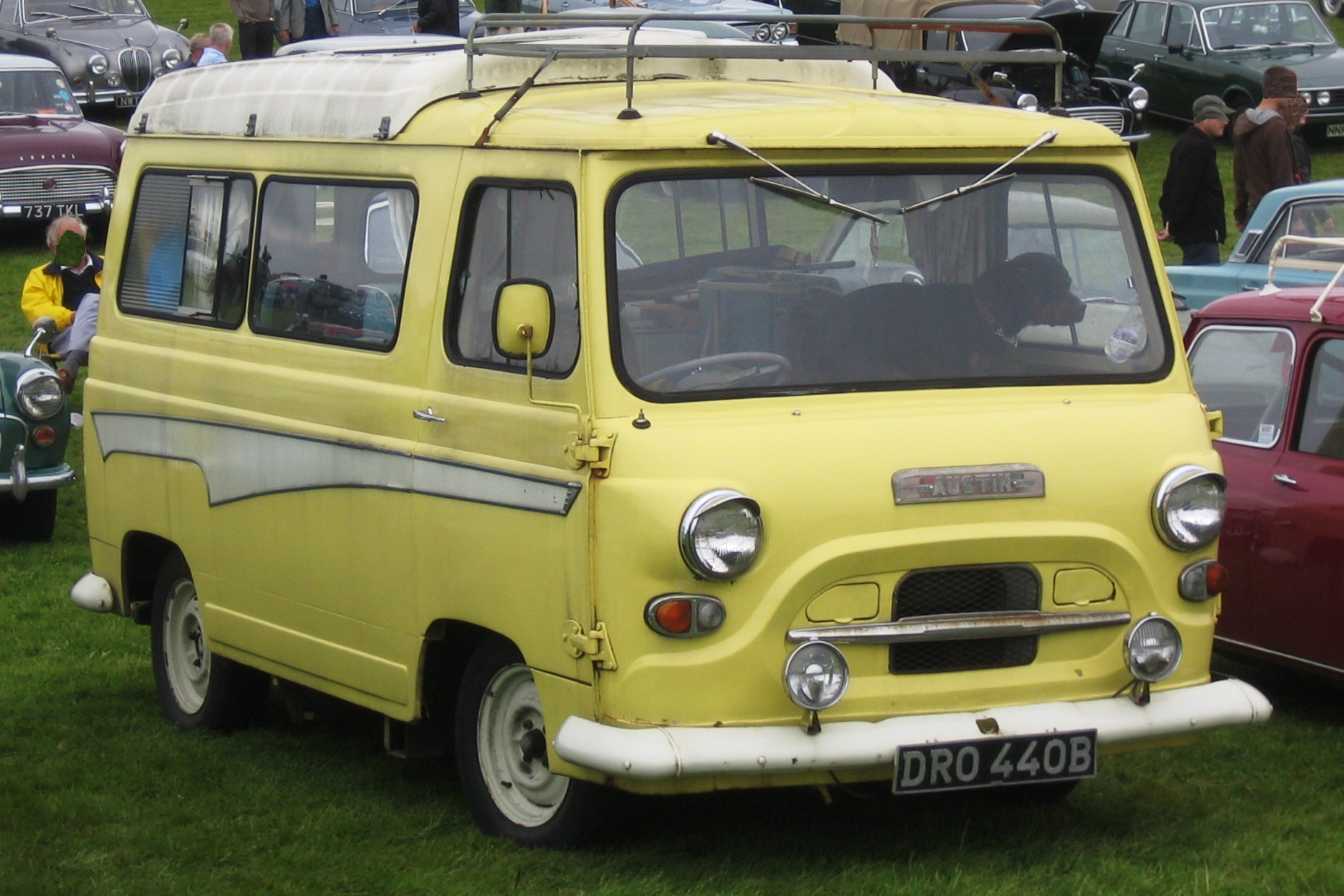
Light van c. 1964

- Austin made a range of commercial vehicles from 1913, including car-based vans, taxis, light commercial vehicles and trucks. After the merger with Morris to form BMC in 1952 the Austin name continued to be used, for example the Austin FG, which was previously the Morris FG. The FG was the workhorse that kept Britain running in the 1960s. These Austin FGs and later the Leyland FGs all had petrol or diesel longstroke engines, producing good torque, but very little in the way of speed (40 mph was a good speed out of these vehicles). Leyland were to take over the FG, but before they did, in 1964, the BBC (British Broadcasting Corporation) commissioned six rolling chassis FGs to be coach-built by a Middlesex company, Palmer Coachbuilders. These six vehicles, registration 660 GYE to 666 GYE, were outdoor broadcast scenery vehicles.

=== Aircraft ===
During the First World War Austin built aircraft under licence, including the Royal Aircraft Factory S.E.5a, but also produced a number of its own designs. None of these progressed past the prototype stage. They included:

- Austin-Ball A.F.B.1 (fighter)
- Austin A.F.T.3 (fighter)
- Austin Greyhound (fighter)
- Austin Kestrel (two-seat biplane)
- Austin Osprey (fighter)
- Austin Whippet (post-war civil aircraft)

== See also ==
- List of car manufacturers of the United Kingdom
- Amalgamated Drawing Office (ADO)
