= Austin 16 hp =

British motor car (1945–1949)

Austin Sixteen BS1
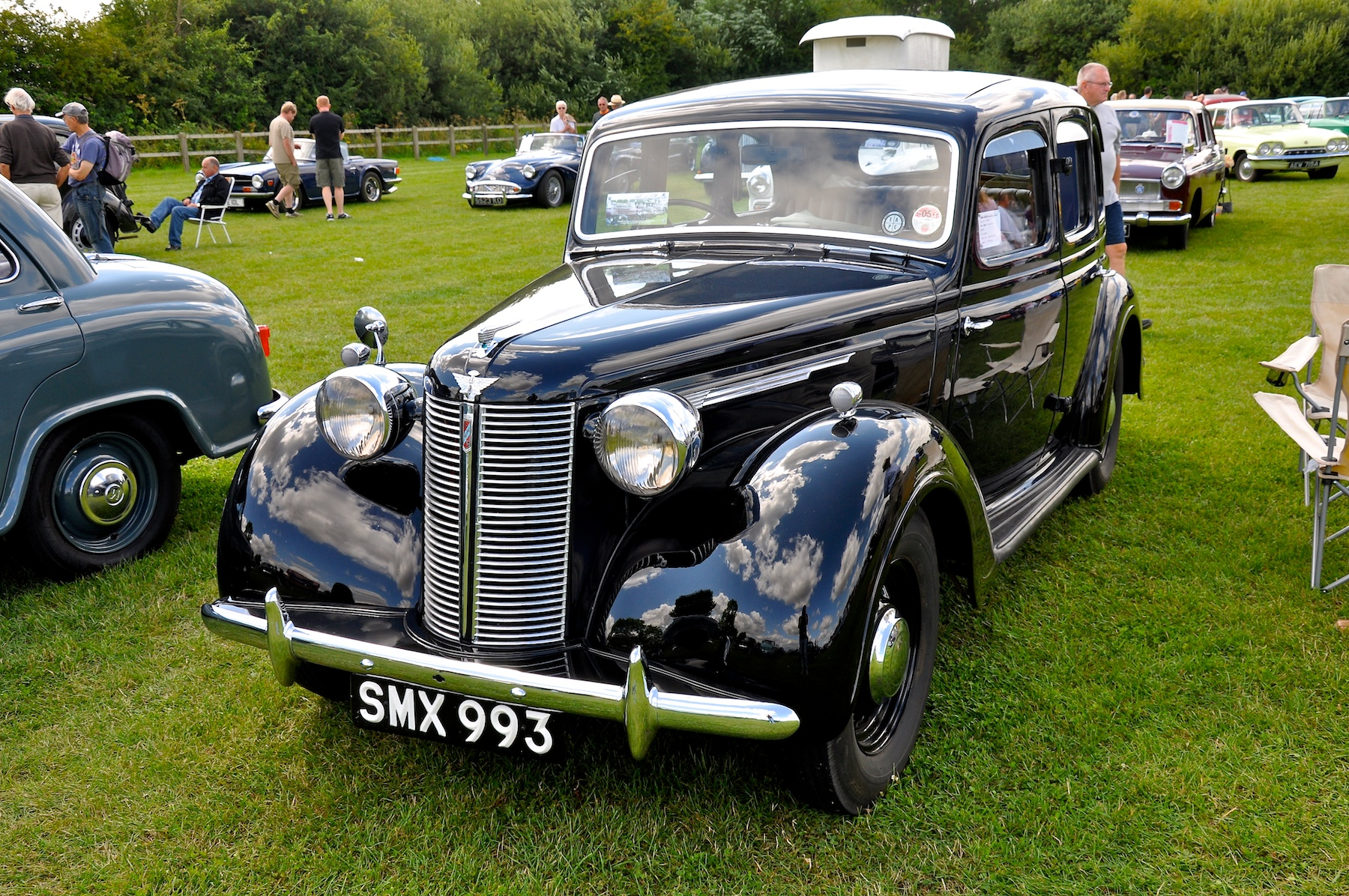
- Austin Sixteen 1948

Overview
- Manufacturer: Austin
- Production: 1945–1949; 35,434 made

Body and chassis
- Body style: 4-door saloon 4-door estate

Powertrain
- Engine: 2199 cc 4-cylinder overhead-valve 67 bhp
- Transmission: 4-speed manual

Dimensions
- Wheelbase: 104.5 in (2,654 mm) track 56 in (1,422 mm)
- Length: 171 in (4,343 mm))
- Width: 67 in (1,702 mm)
- Kerb weight: 27 cwt, 3,024 lb (1,372 kg)

Chronology
- Predecessor: Austin 16, Austin 18
- Successor: Austin A70

Austin 2.2-litre ohv BS1

Overview
- Manufacturer: Austin
- Also called: Used in Austin K8 25 cwt van Austin London Taxicab and Hire Car; Austin Champ; Austin A70; Austin Gipsy; Austin A90 Atlantic; Austin-Healey 100

Layout
- Displacement: 2,199 cc (134 cu in)
- Cylinder bore: 79.3 mm (3.12 in)
- Piston stroke: 111 mm (4.4 in)
- Valvetrain: Overhead valves
- Compression ratio: 6.85:1

Combustion
- Fuel system: Zenith 41 VI-8 downdraught carburettor

Output
- Power output: 67 bhp (50 kW; 68 PS) @3,800 rpm tax horsepower 15.6

The Austin Sixteen (also Austin 16) is a 2.2-litre motor car that was built by Austin from 1945 until 1949. It was the first 'new' car to be produced by Austin following the end of the Second World War. Apart from the name, it shared nothing with the pre war Austin 16.

Whilst it used a brand new 4-cylinder 2199 cc, overhead-valve engine—the first to be used in an Austin car, it in fact used the chassis and body of the pre-war Austin 12, which continued to be produced, alongside the other pre-war saloons the 8 hp and the 10 hp. The number Sixteen was not an indication of the actual power output of the engine but rather the result of a calculation used to determine the excise duty (road tax) payable for the vehicle. The engine in fact produced 67 bhp (50 kW) at 3800 rpm. The car shared a number of features with the famed London Taxi, one of which was the built-in hydraulic jacking system operated from a pump located under the bonnet.

The Sixteen had a healthy turn of speed for its day with a maximum quoted speed of 75 mph (121 km/h). In the bitterly cold winter of 1947 Alan Hess and a team of drivers with 3 Austin Sixteen vehicles undertook a publicity run on behalf of the Austin Motor Company to visit seven Northern European Capitals in seven days. Despite extraordinary travel difficulties caused by heavy snow, the vehicles completed the adventure successfully, and the story is related in Alan Hess's book, Gullible's Travels.

Steering was by a cam and lever system which provided a dual ratio to ease parking. Suspension was all elliptic (overslung in front, underslung at the rear) with rigid beam axles all controlled by Luvax-Girling double acting hydraulic shock absorbers—a transverse torsion bar linking both pairs. Brakes by Girling were mechanical using a wedge and roller system in 11 inch drums with twin leading shoes in the front drums.

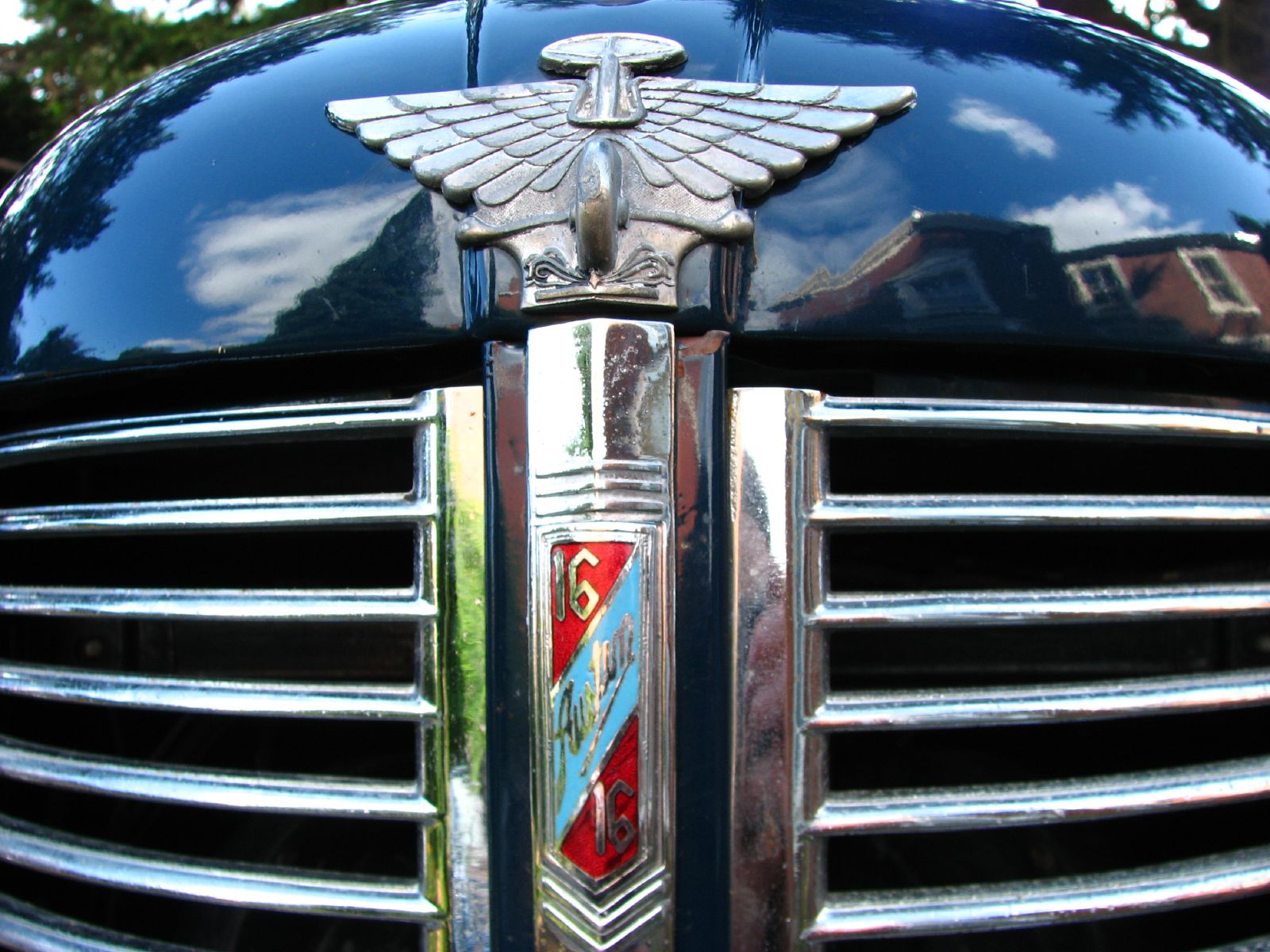
Austin 16 badge

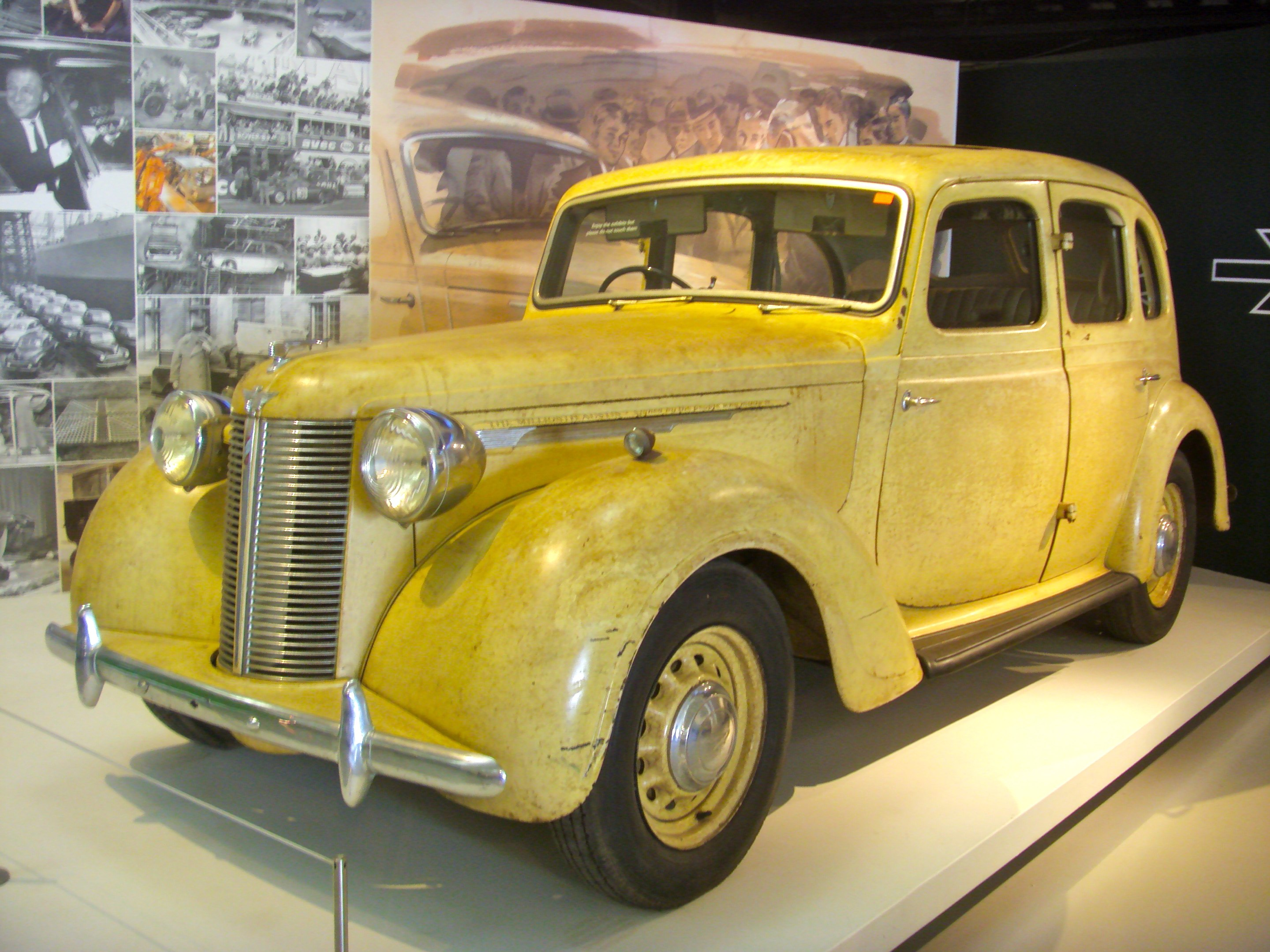
1946 Austin Sixteen BS1, The 1 millionth Austin produced
