= Austin A70 =

Austin A70 Hampshire/Hereford
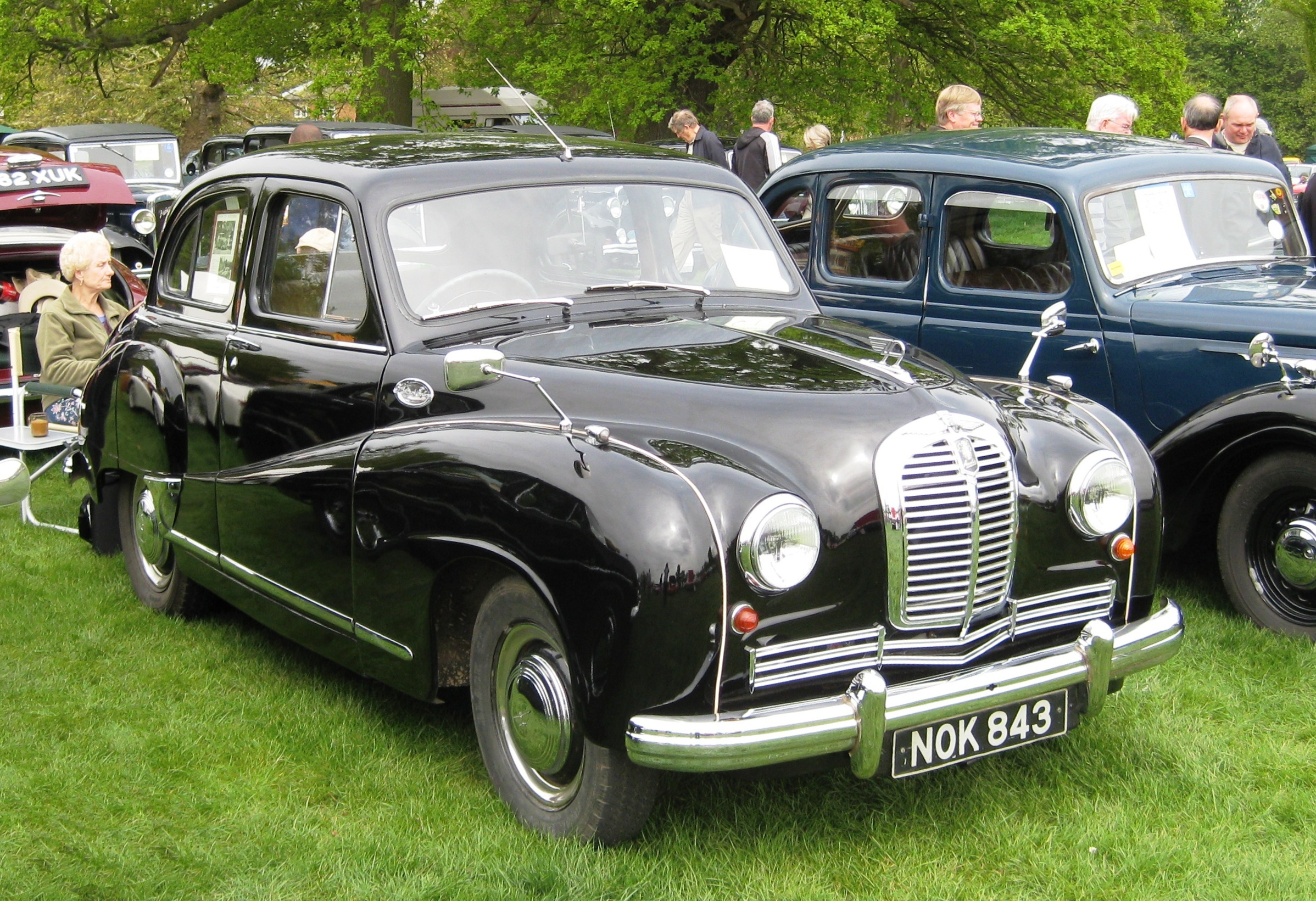
- Austin A70 Hereford

Overview
- Manufacturer: Austin
- Production: 1948–1954
- Assembly: United Kingdom: Longbridge, England; Australia: Melbourne

Body and chassis
- Layout: FR layout

Powertrain
- Engine: 2199 cc Straight-4

Chronology
- Predecessor: Austin 16 hp
- Successor: A90 Westminster; Austin J4 (for coupé utility)

The Austin A70 Hampshire and later Austin A70 Hereford are cars that were produced by Austin of Britain from 1948 until 1954. They were conventional body-on-frame cars with similar styling to the smaller A40 Devon and A40 Somerset models respectively, though with an entirely different larger and wider body on chassis construction. 85,682 were built.

== A70 Hampshire ==
A70 Hampshire
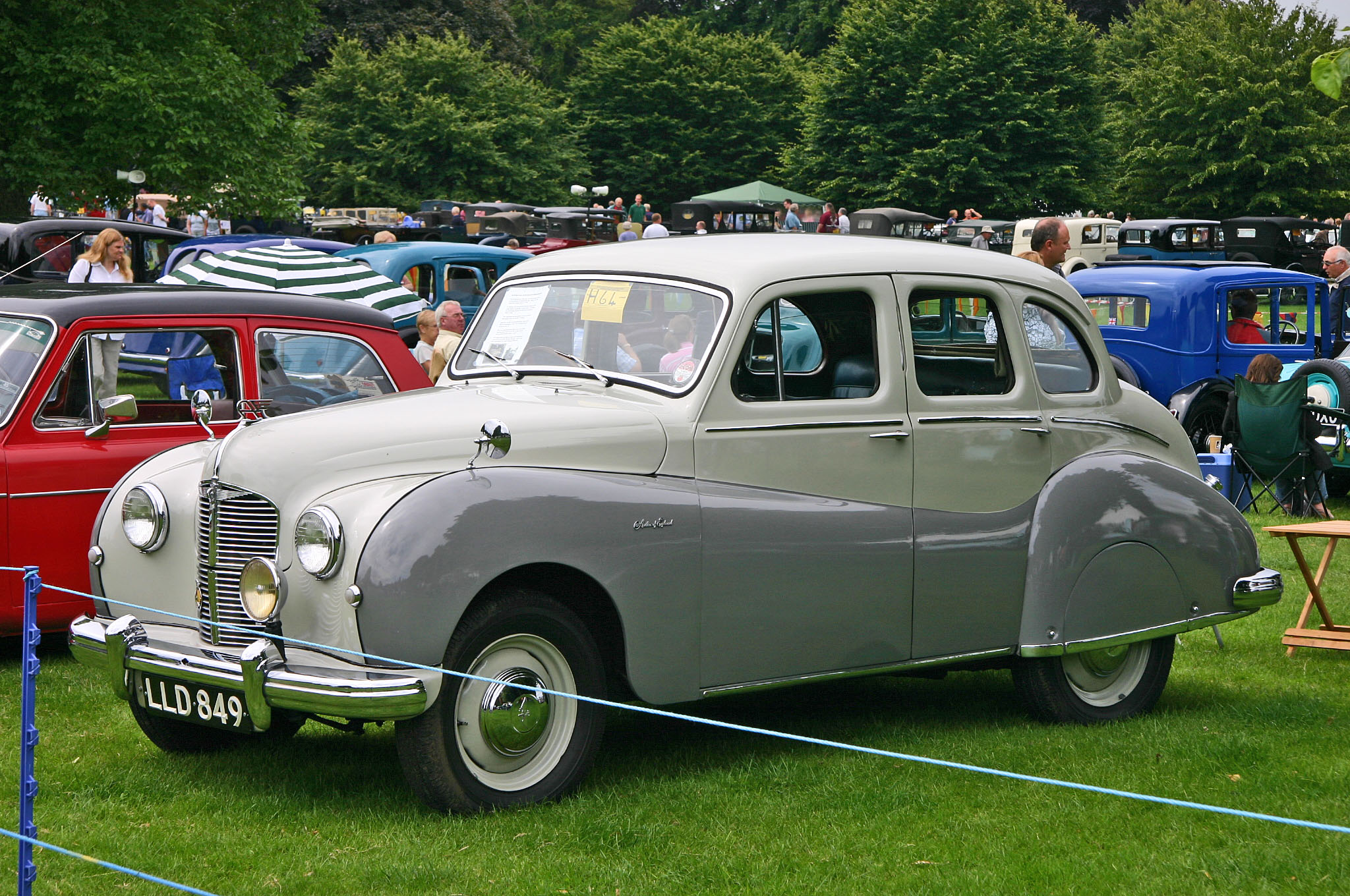
- Austin A70 Hampshire

Overview
- Also called: Austin A70 Countryman; Austin A70 Pick-up
- Production: 1948–1950

Body and chassis
- Body style: 4-door saloon 2-door estate 2-door pickup

Dimensions
- Wheelbase: 96 in (2,438 mm)
- Length: 163 in (4,140 mm)

Most first generation A70s were Hampshire 4-door saloons, though some estate and pickup truck versions were also produced as the A70 Countryman and A70 Pick-up respectively. The 2.2 L (2199 cc) straight-4 pushrod engine provided the same power output, at 67 bhp (50 kW), as it had when installed in the earlier Austin 16 hp. The new car was nevertheless lighter and published acceleration and top speed figures were correspondingly brisker. Accelerating from 0-80 km/h (50 mph) took 14.5 seconds and the maximum speed was 83.3 mph (134.1 km/h). The Hampshire used Girling hydraulic brakes which operated on the front wheels only; the rears being mechanical, a setup which was shared with the earlier (GS2) A40 Devon.

Production of the model ended in 1950 with 35,261 being built. In 1950 the UK price was £648, which included the heater.

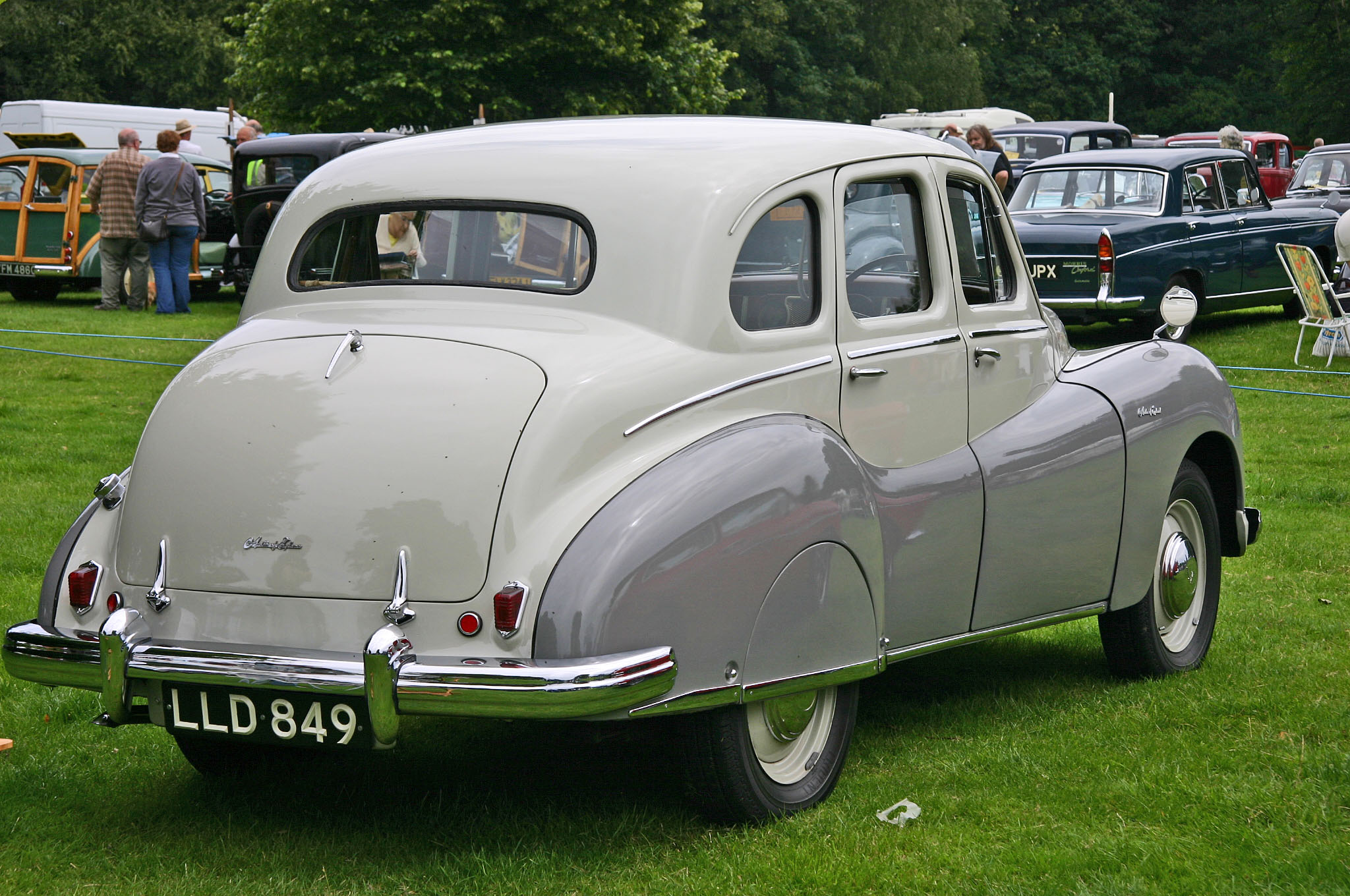
1948–50 Austin A70 Hampshire rear view

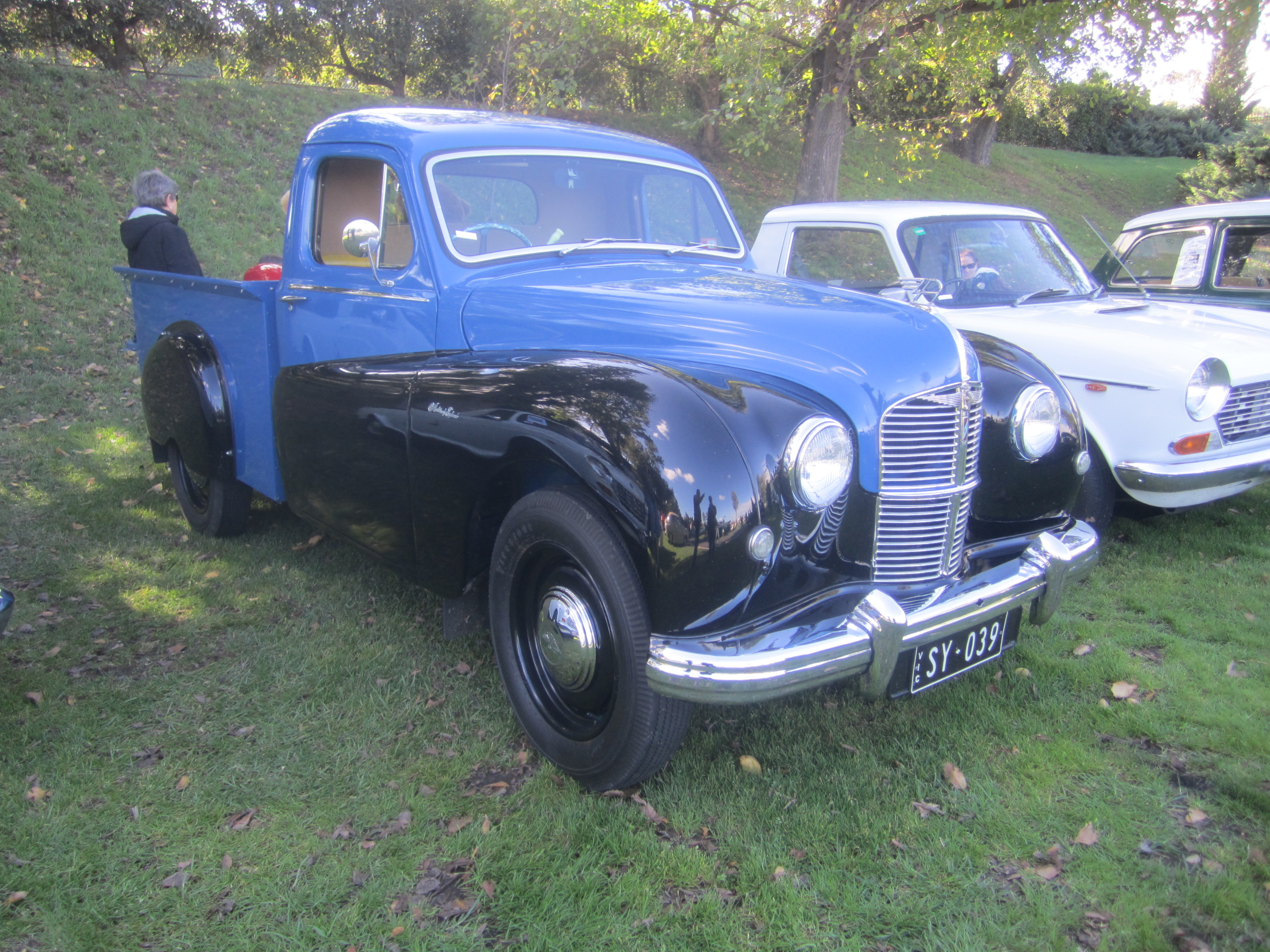
Austin A70 Pick-up

== A70 Hereford ==
A70 Hereford
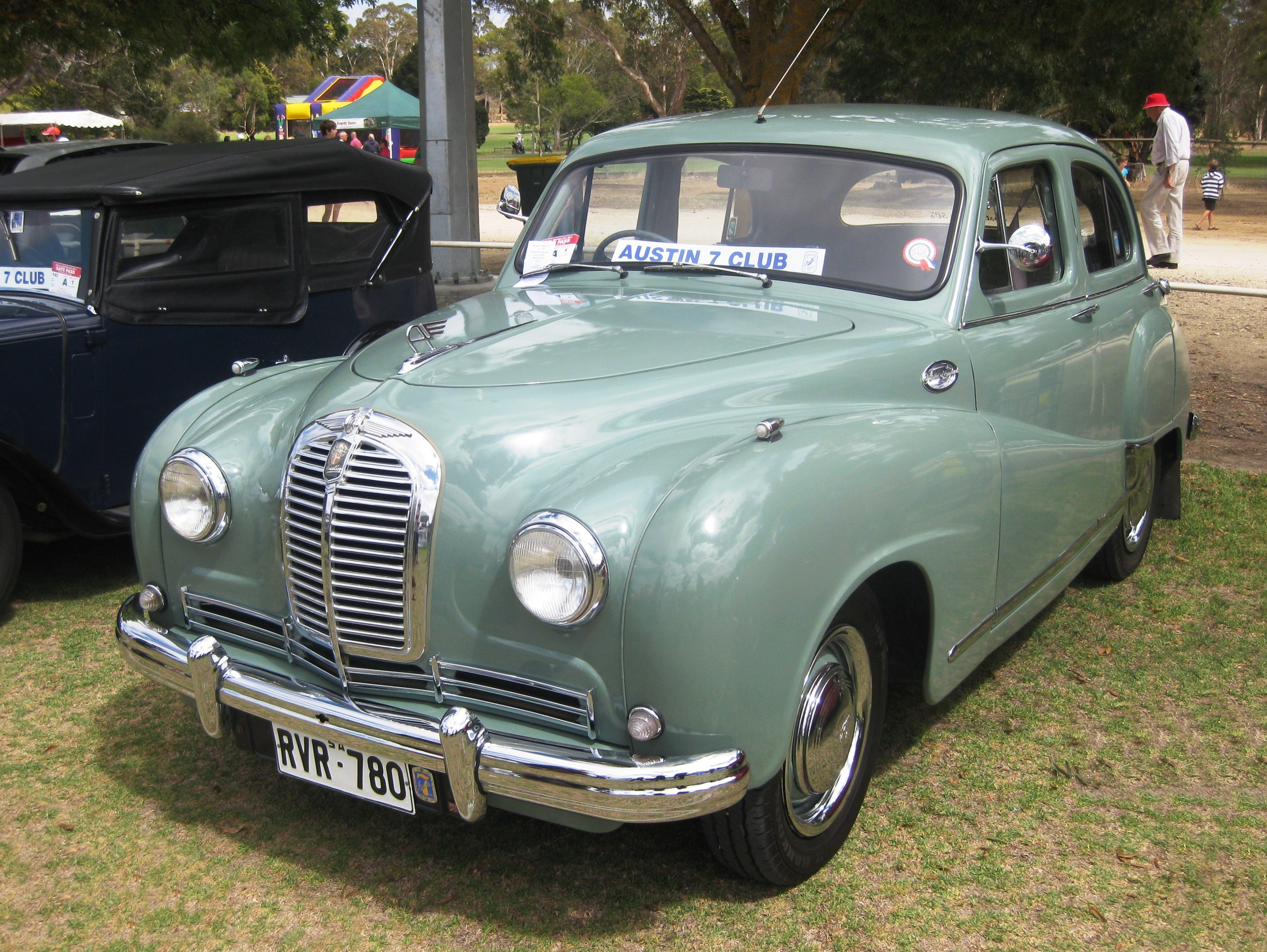
- Austin A70 Hereford

Overview
- Also called: Austin A70 Countryman; Austin A70 Coupe; Austin A70 Pick-up
- Production: 1950–1954
- Assembly: United Kingdom; Australia

Body and chassis
- Body style: 4-door saloon 2-door estate 2-door convertible 2-door coupé utility

Dimensions
- Wheelbase: 99 in (2,515 mm)
- Length: 167.5 in (4,254 mm)
- Width: 69.5 in (1,765 mm)
- Height: 65.5 in (1,660 mm)

The A70 Hereford replaced the Hampshire in 1950 and was wider and slightly longer with an extra 3 inches (76 mm) in the wheelbase. A new addition to the range was the A70 Coupé, a 2-door convertible with coachwork by Carbodies of Coventry. A notable mechanical change was the use of fully hydraulic brakes. The smaller A40 Somerset had similar styling and shared the same doors and rear wings.

The car retained the 2199cc 4-cylinder engine first seen officially in 1945 on the Austin 16. Performance was adequate by the standards of the time, but the car was not particularly quiet, and an Autocar magazine road test in 1950 reported a "small vibration at about 40 m.p.h. on the overrun" on its test car. Austin had given a lead after the war in equipping its cars with interior heaters at no extra cost, and the Hereford came fitted with "the latest Smiths fresh-air installation" as standard equipment. The road tester found the heater, like the engine and indeed the windscreen wipers, "rather noisy in operation", however.

Sales were slow, with 50,421 having been produced when the A90 Westminster replaced it in 1954. Another rare variant was the A70 Pickup/Ute This shared the same platform as the estate, but with fully faired bodywork aft of the driving cab. The interior of this rather plush workhorse was the same as the saloon, but instead of a large split-bench seat the pickup had a full-width bench seat. This was the last large Austin coupé utility, replaced by the Austin J4 in 1960, and the engine would later be used on the 1958 Austin Gipsy. Full instrumentation was mounted in the centre of the dashboard allowing easy viewing whether for left- or right-hand drive versions. All variations had a 4 speed steering column gear change.

An A70 tested by the British magazine The Motor in 1951 had a top speed of 80.5 mph (129.6 km/h) and could accelerate from 0-60 mph (97 km/h) in 21.4 seconds. A fuel consumption of 21.9 miles per imperial gallon (12.9 L/100 km; 18.2 mpg_{‑US}) was recorded. The test car cost £911 including taxes.

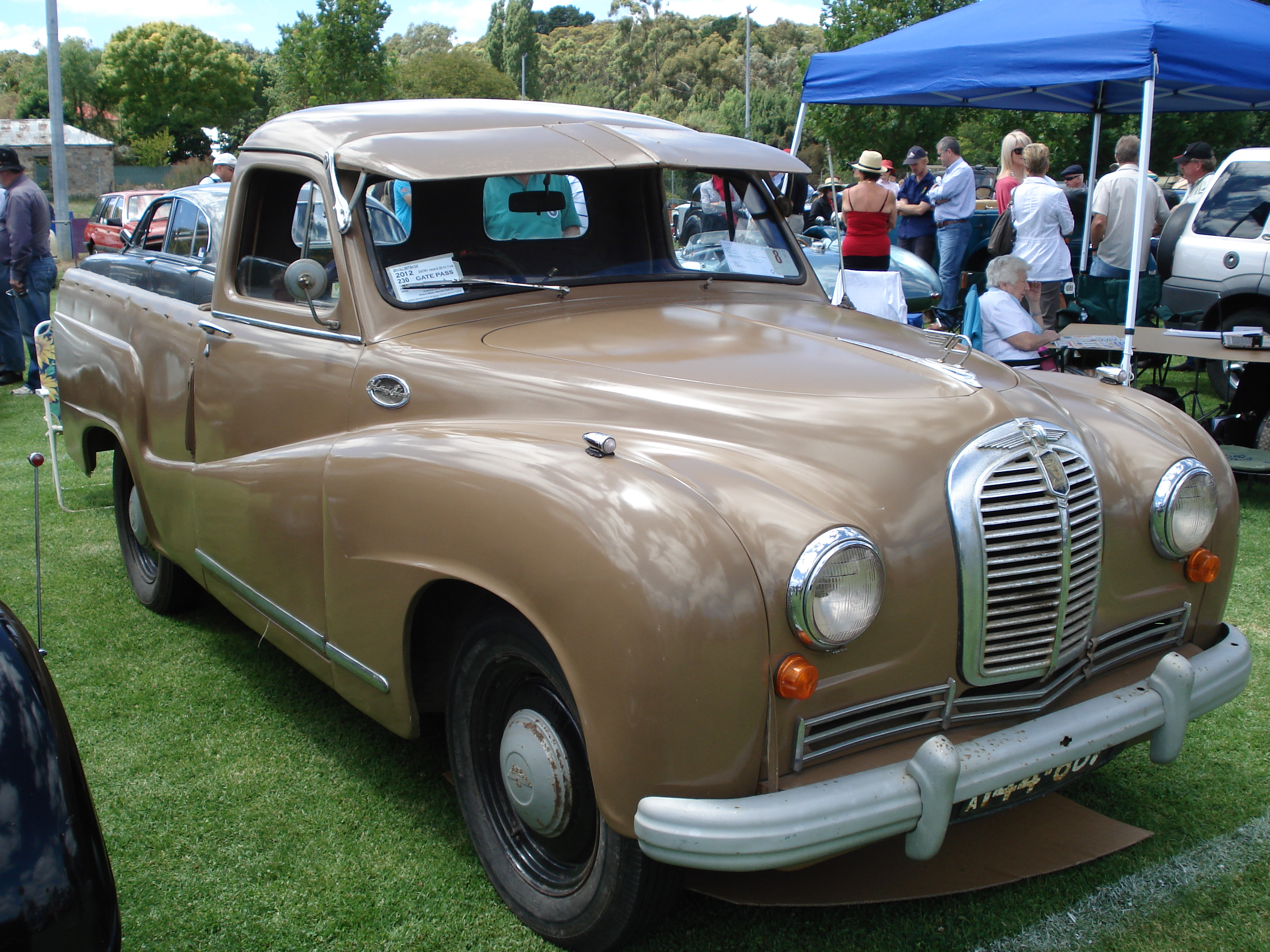
1954 Austin A70 Pick-up
