= Austin Westminster =

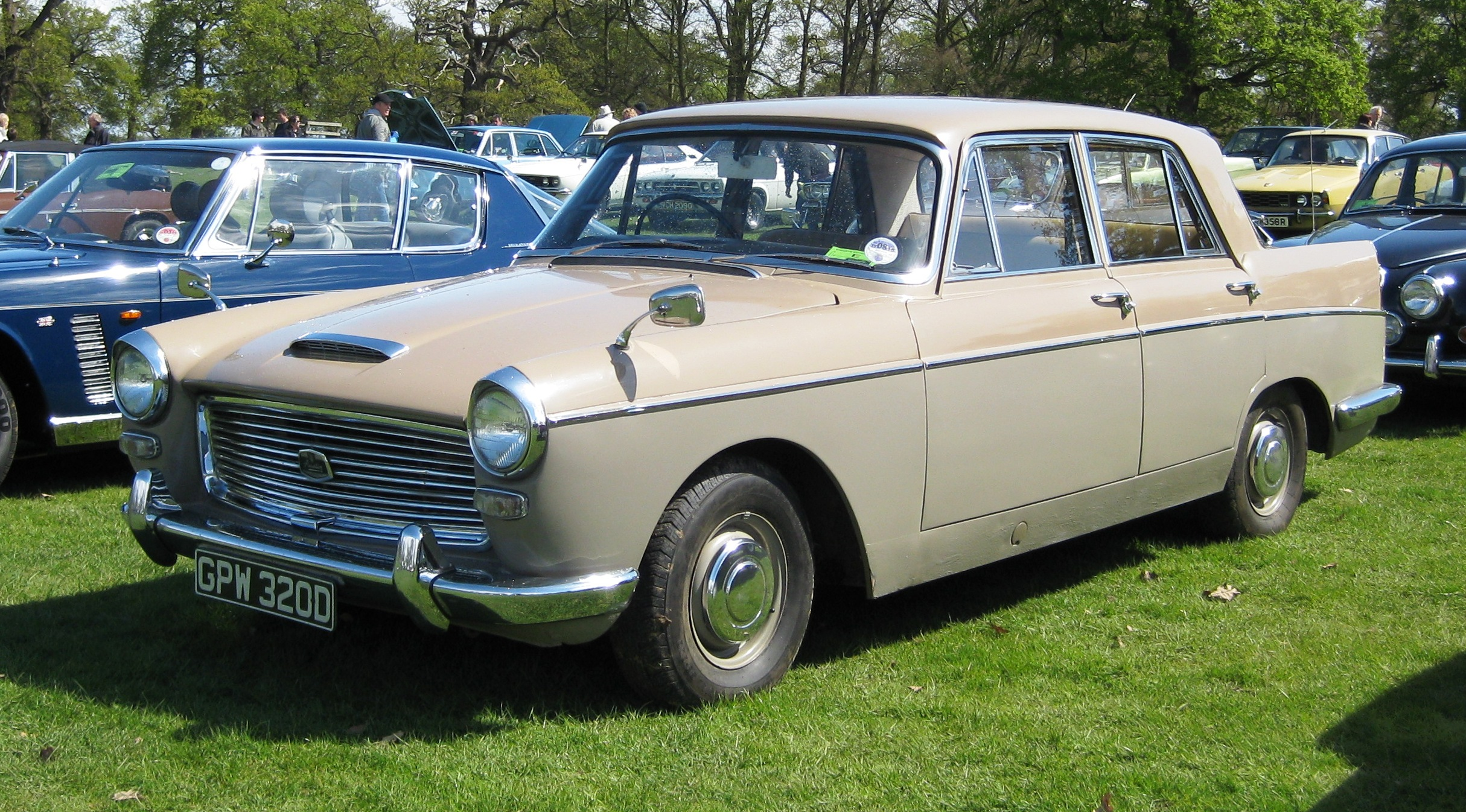
- 1966 Austin A110 Westminster

Overview
- Manufacturer: Austin (BMC)
- Production: 1954–1968

Body and chassis
- Class: Executive car

Chronology
- Predecessor: Austin A70 Hereford
- Successor: Austin 3-Litre

The Austin Westminster series are large saloon and estate cars that were sold by the British manufacturer Austin from 1954, replacing the A70 Hereford. The Westminster line was produced as the A90, A95, A99, A105, and A110 until 1968 when the new Austin 3-Litre took its place. Essentially badge-engineered versions of the Farina Westminsters were also produced using the premium Wolseley and Vanden Plas marques. 101,634 Westminsters were built.

The Westminster name was previously used by the Austin Motor Company in the 1930s for a four light version of the 16/6 and the Heavy 12/4.

== A90 ==
A90
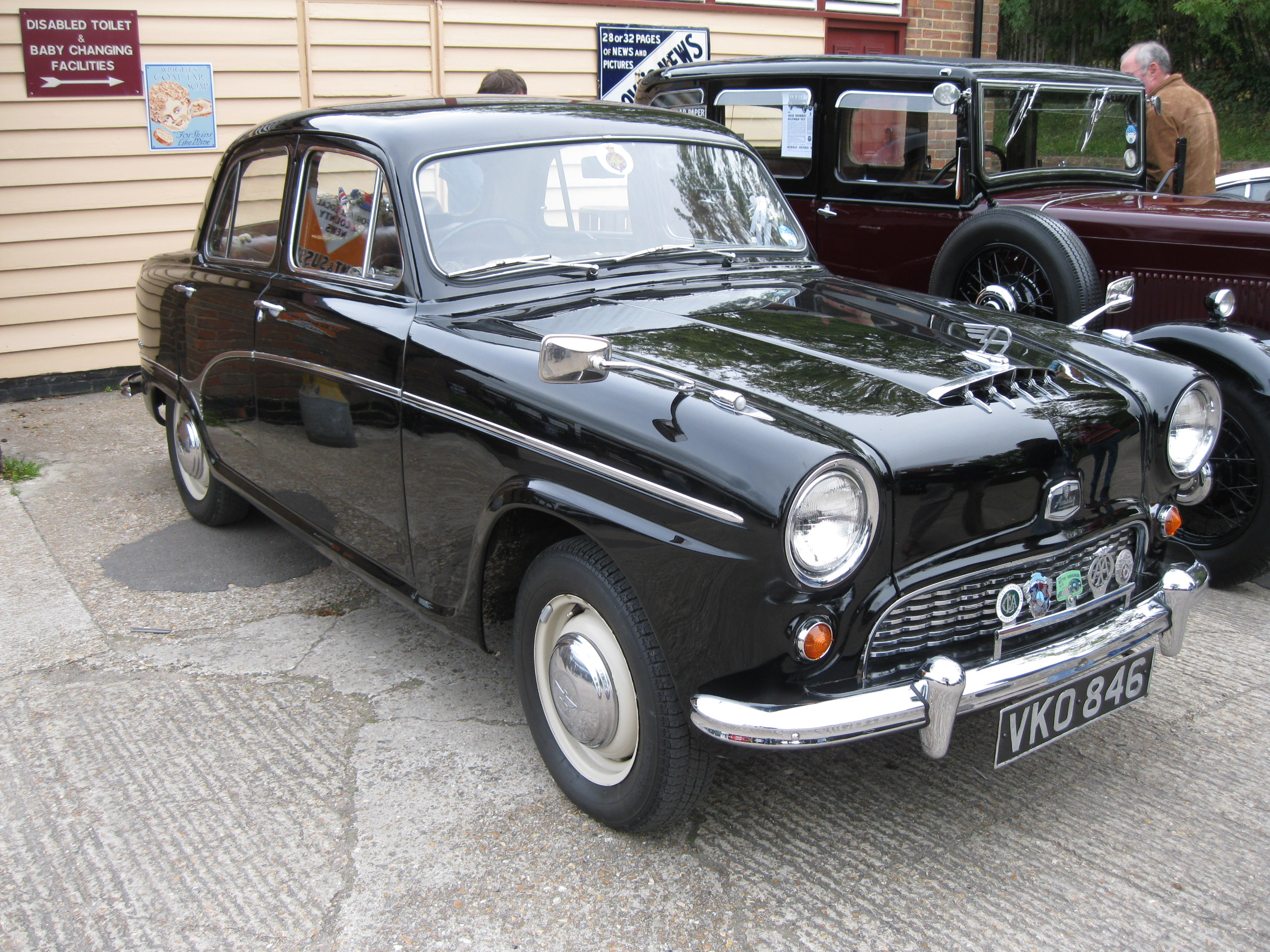
- Austin A90 Six Westminster

Overview
- Production: 1954–1956
- Assembly: United Kingdom: Longbridge, England (Longbridge plant); Australia: Sydney (BMC Australia)

Body and chassis
- Body style: 4-door saloon
- Layout: FR layout

Powertrain
- Engine: 2.6 L C-Series I6
- Transmission: 4-speed manual overdrive optional from 1955

Dimensions
- Wheelbase: 104 in (2,642 mm)
- Length: 170 in (4,318 mm)
- Width: 64 in (1,626 mm)
- Height: 63.25 in (1,607 mm)

The A90 Six Westminster was introduced at the 1954 London Motor Show at the same time as the small A40/A50 Cambridge saloon range. It used the new BMC C-Series straight-6 engine with single Zenith carburettor which, at 2.6 L (2639 cc), produced 85 hp (63 kW). The suspension is independent at the front using coil springs and wishbones and leaf spring and anti-roll bar on the live axle at the rear. The four-speed transmission has synchromesh on the top three ratios and from 1955 an overdrive unit could be specified.

The interior, with leather trim on the de luxe version and PVC on the standard model, has a split bench front seat arrangement, although individually adjustable, which if necessary could seat three people abreast. When only two are carried there are, on the de luxe model, fold down centre armrests at the side of each seat. The de luxe model also has a central fold down armrest in the rear. The handbrake control is under the dash on the right hand side of the steering column which also carries the gear change lever. A heater is fitted as standard on the de luxe model but optional on the standard version. The Austin Motor Company also produced a brochure for an A90 Six Westminster police car which featured a floor gearchange.

The British Motor magazine tested a Westminster de luxe saloon in 1955 recording a top speed of 85.7 mph (137.9 km/h) and acceleration from 0–60 mph (97 km/h) in 18.9 seconds and a fuel consumption of 20.2 miles per imperial gallon (14.0 L/100 km; 16.8 mpg_{‑US}). The test car cost £834 including taxes.

The A90 designation had previously been carried by the 1948–52 Austin Atlantic. 25,532 A90 Six Westminsters were built.

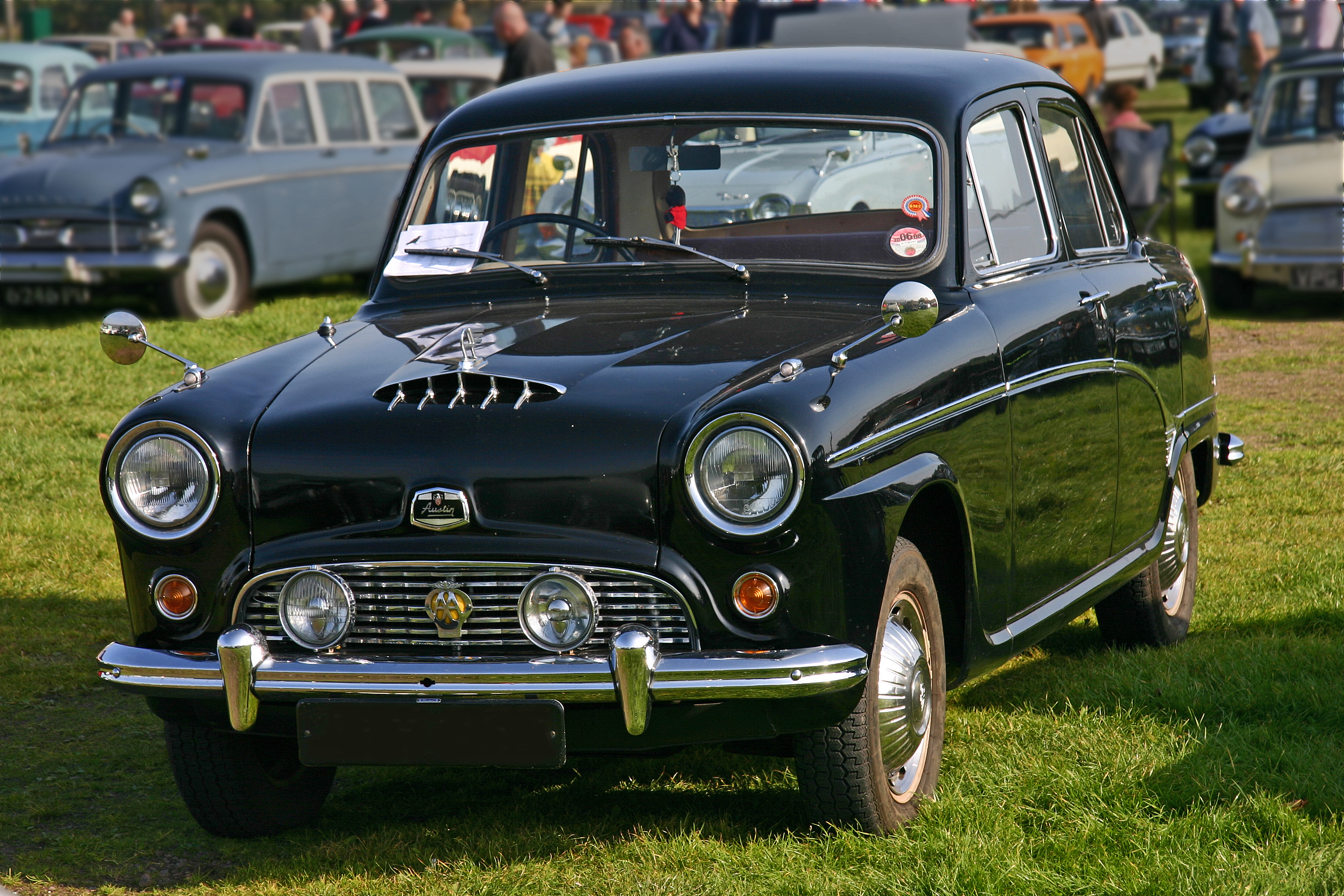
A90 Westminster

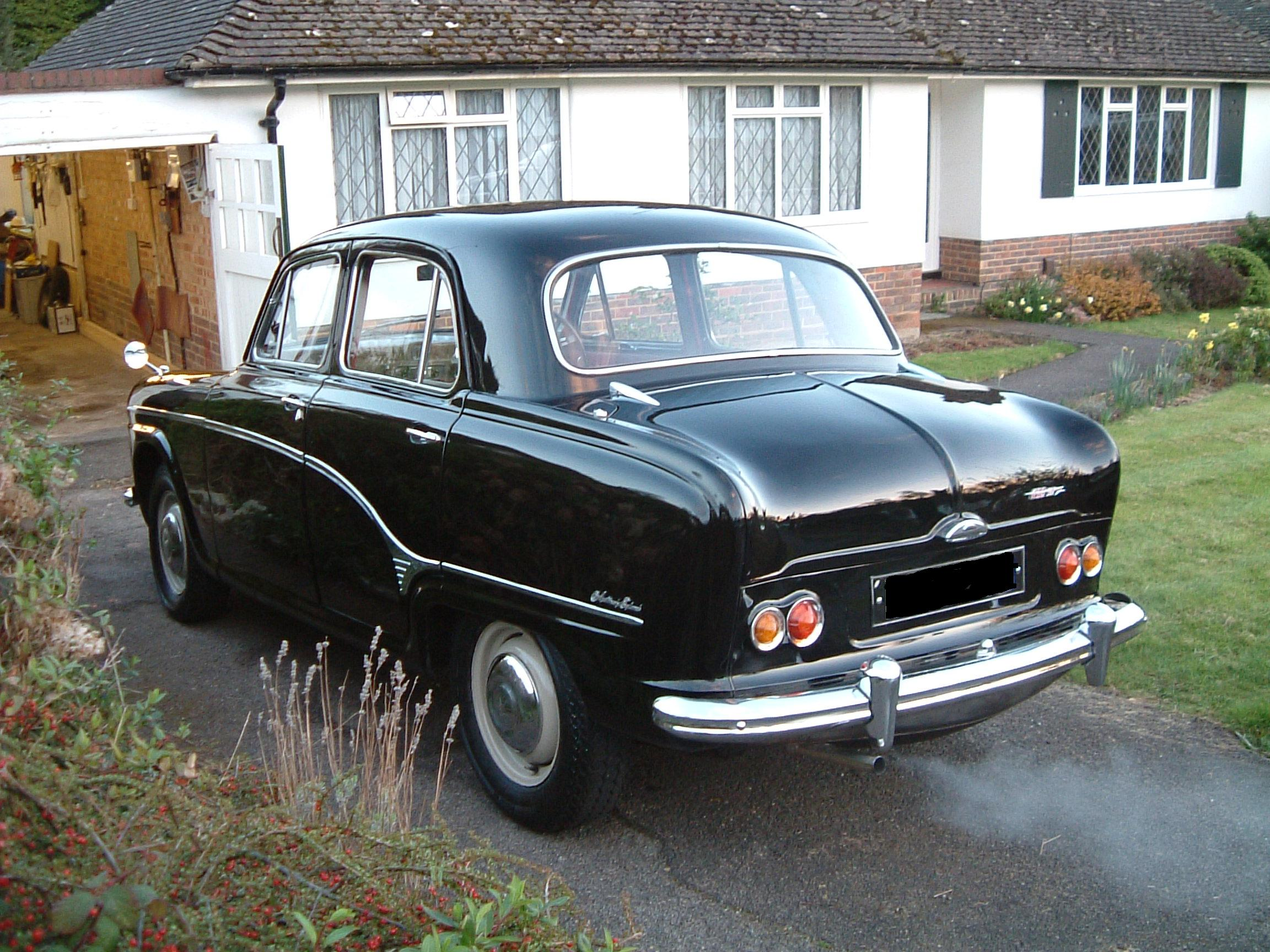

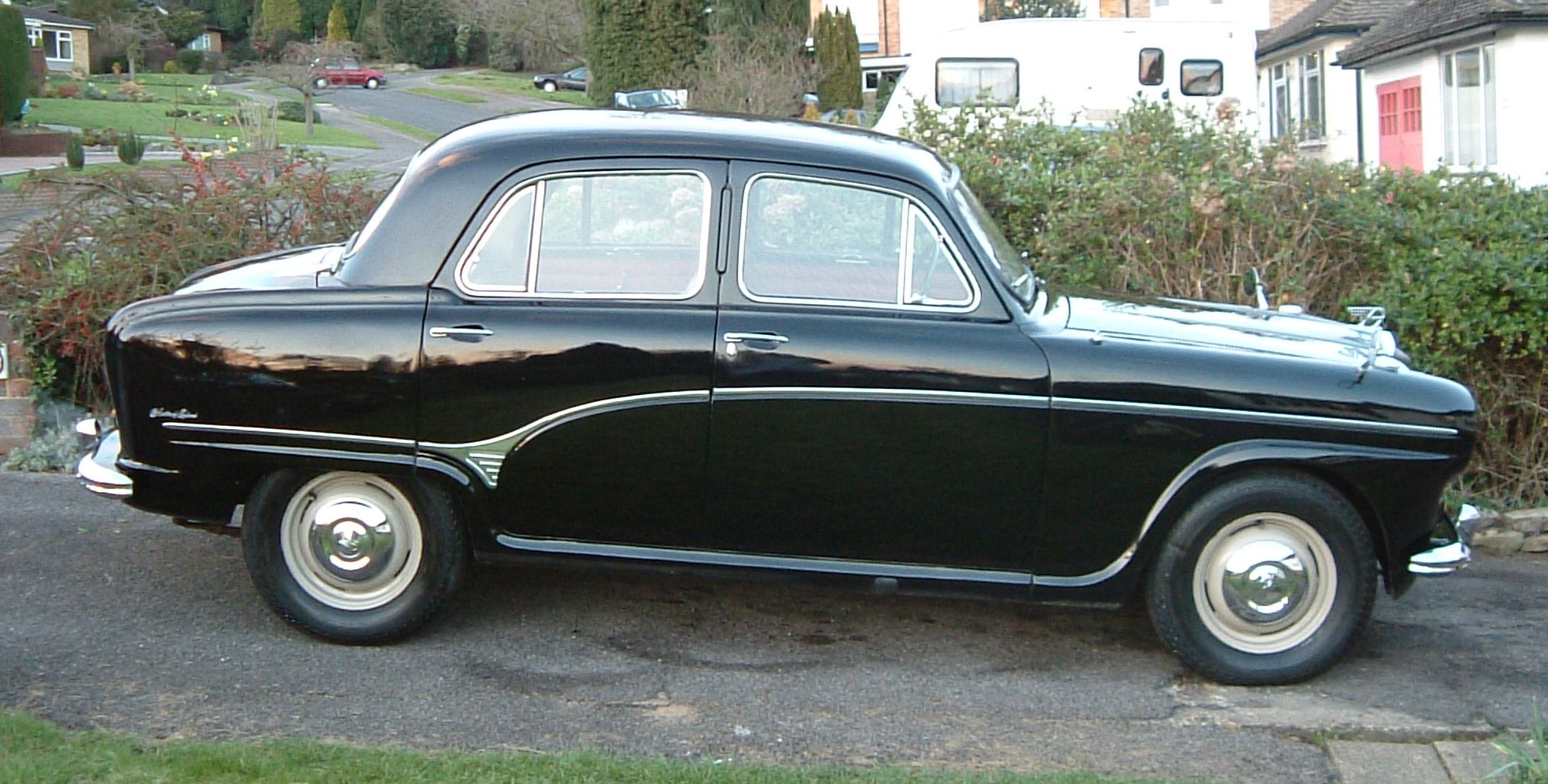

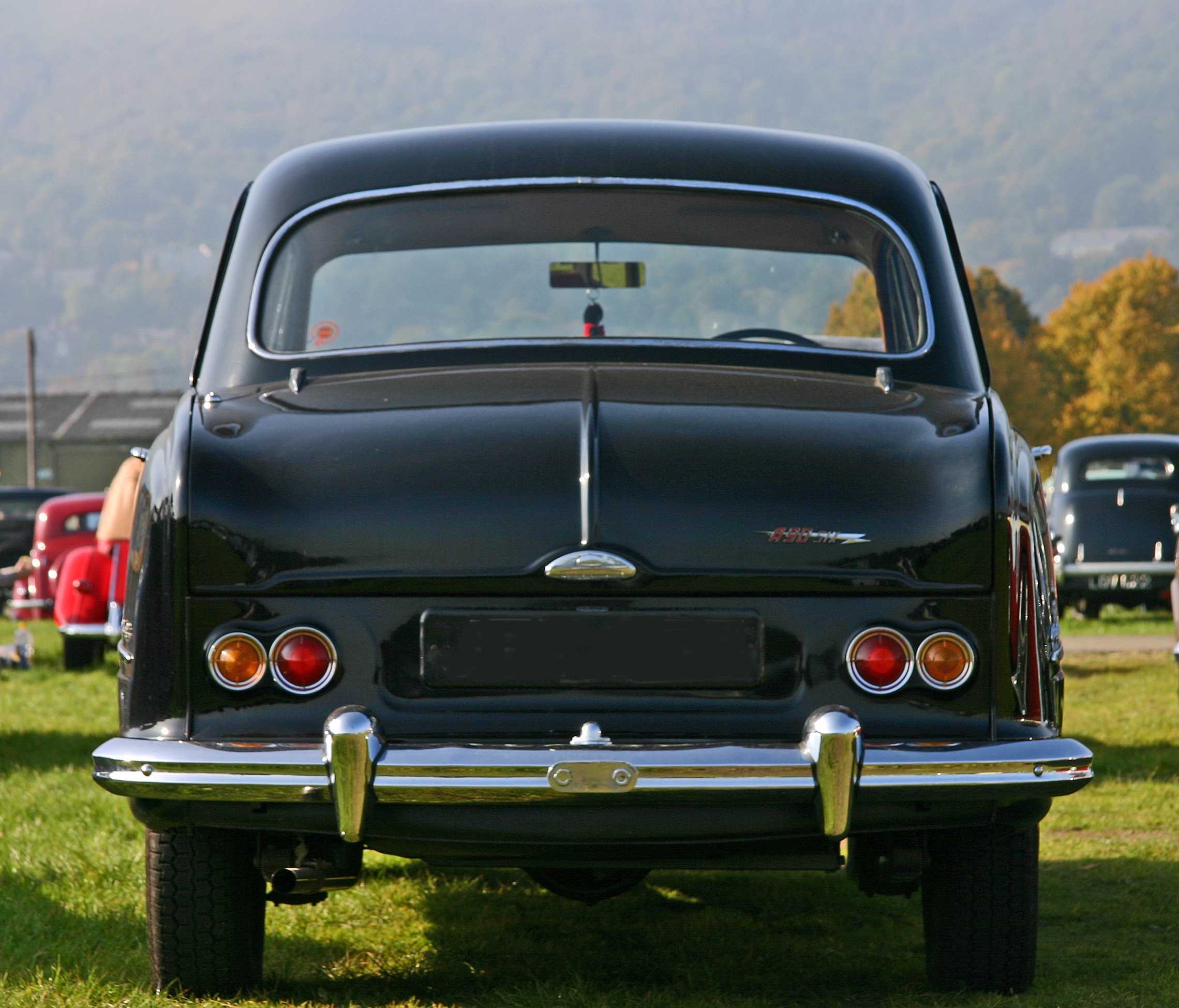
'cow hips' tail

== A95/A105 ==
A95/A105
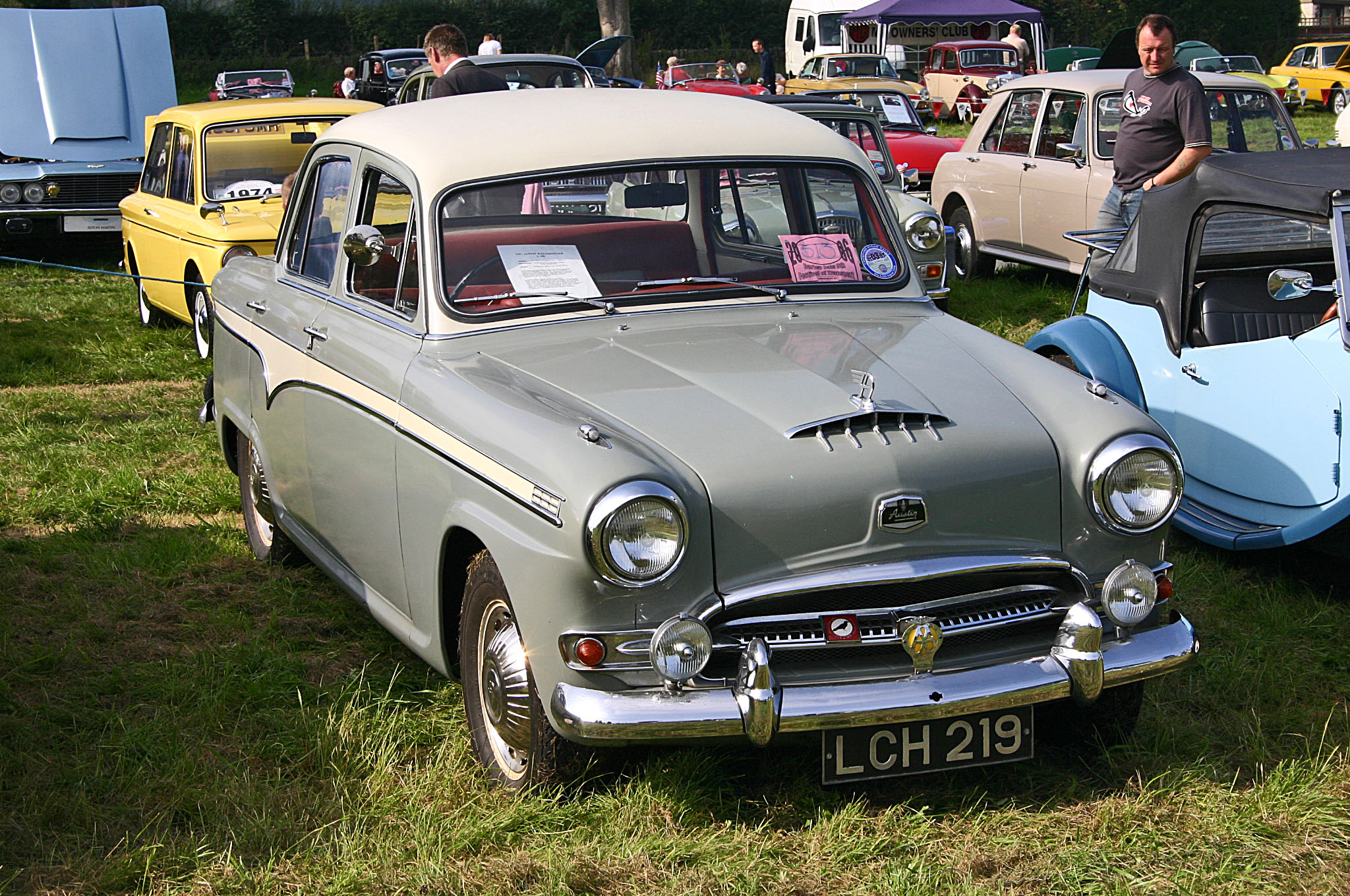
- Austin A105 Westminster saloon

Overview
- Production: 1956–1959
- Assembly: United Kingdom: Longbridge, England; Australia: Sydney (BMC Australia)

Body and chassis
- Body style: 4-door saloon 4-door estate (A95)
- Layout: FR layout
- Related: Morris Marshal

Powertrain
- Engine: 2.6 L C-Series I6

Dimensions
- Wheelbase: 104 in (2,642 mm); 106 in (2,692 mm) from May 1956
- Length: 170 in (4,318 mm); 181 in (4,597 mm) from May 1956
- Width: 64 in (1,626 mm)
- Height: 61 in (1,549 mm)

In May 1956, for a brief period only, a derivative of the A90 Six Westminster was announced which was a short boot version of the A105 and had the twin SU carburettor/102 hp version of the 2.6-litre C series engine with overdrive as standard. In October 1956 the A105 received the longer wheelbase with overdrive as standard and automatic transmission as an option. Twin fog lights, heater and wheel trims were standard although a radio was still an option. Two tone paint and white wall tyres were introduced for visual effect. Very few short boot versions of the A105 were produced and they are now quite rare.

The A90 was updated for autumn 1956 as the A95. Along with more power, the A95 was longer and now offered an estate model. Overdrive and an automatic transmission were new as well, something of a novelty in British cars of the time.

Both the A95 and A105 were produced together until 1959. 28,065 A95s and 6,770 A105s were built.

The Westminster name was dropped from the sales literature for the A95 and the A105 although, oddly, the drivers' handbooks still used the name Westminster to title the illustration of the saloon. The estate version was named Countryman. Nevertheless, most enthusiasts still refer to them as Westminsters.

A badge-engineered version of the A95 with different grille, trim, and badges and a bench front seat was assembled and sold in Australia as the Morris Marshal from 1957 until 1960.

An A105 saloon with overdrive tested by the British magazine The Motor in 1956 had a top speed of 96.3 mph (155.0 km/h) and could accelerate from 0–60 mph (97 km/h) in 15.4 seconds. A fuel consumption of 22.0 miles per imperial gallon (12.8 L/100 km; 18.3 mpg_{‑US}) was recorded. The test car cost £1109 including taxes.

In popular culture, the Austin A95 has a degree of infamy for being the vehicle that Thich Quang Duc rode in to the site in Saigon where he proceeded to immolate himself in protest of the religious persecution of the Ngo Dinh Diem administration in South Vietnam. The blue A95 sedan which he was transported in is clearly visible in the background of the famous photograph of the burning monk, and the car itself remains on display at the Thien Mu pagoda in Huế. Later, the debut studio album of Rage Against the Machine featured the image on its cover artwork, once again cementing the A95's inextricable link to one of the most important photographs ever captured in the entire history of photojournalism.

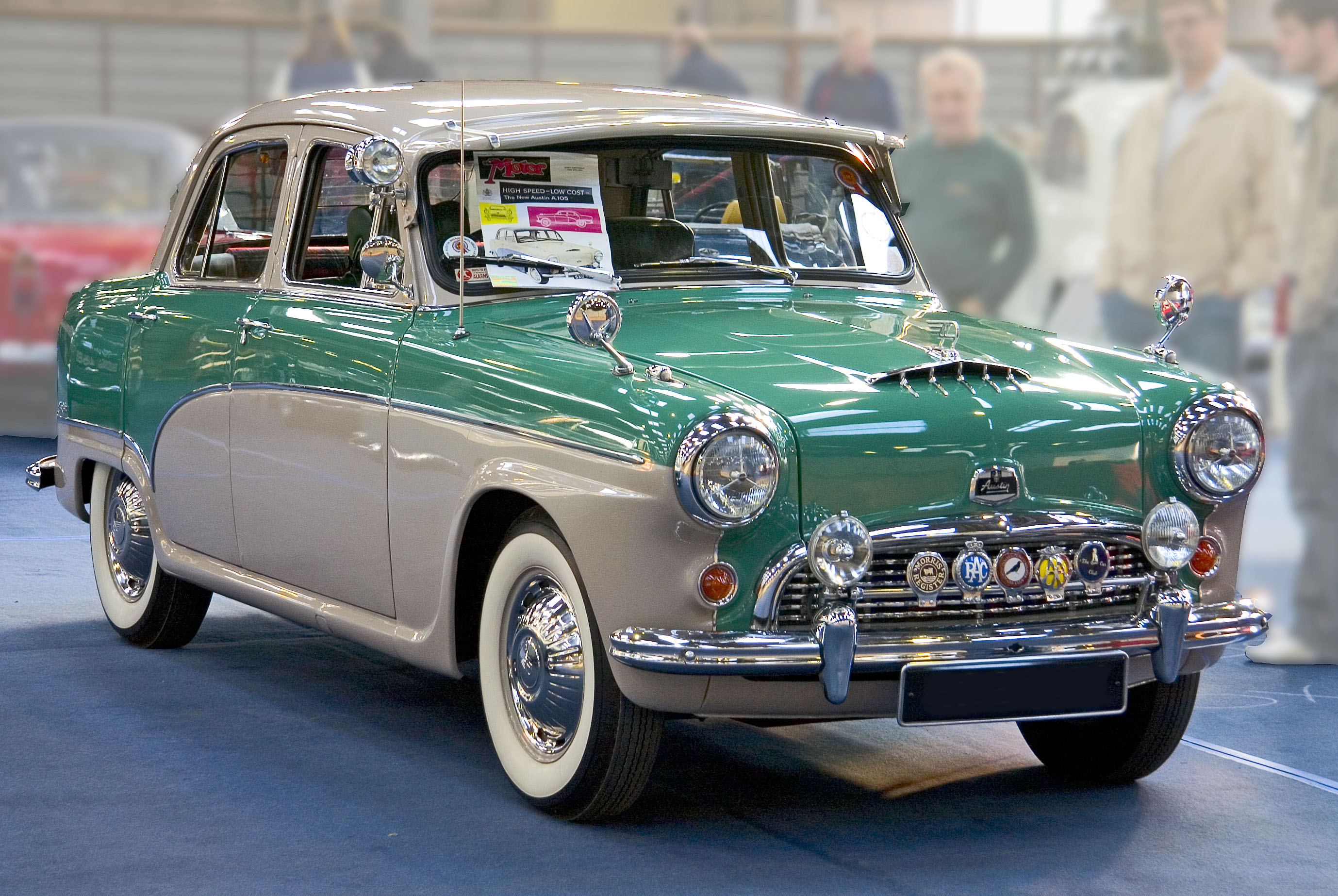
A105 first model

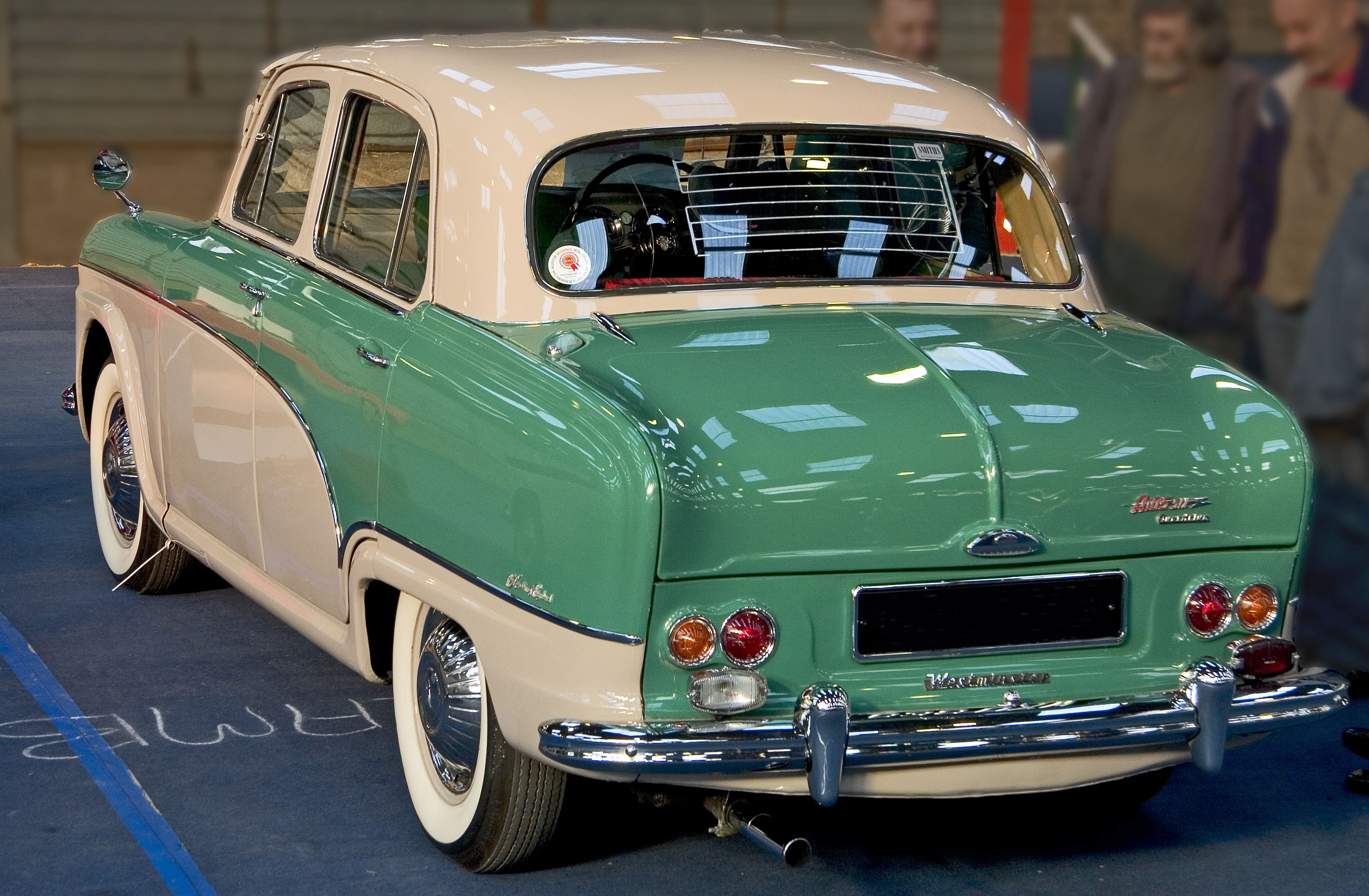
A105 'cow hips' model

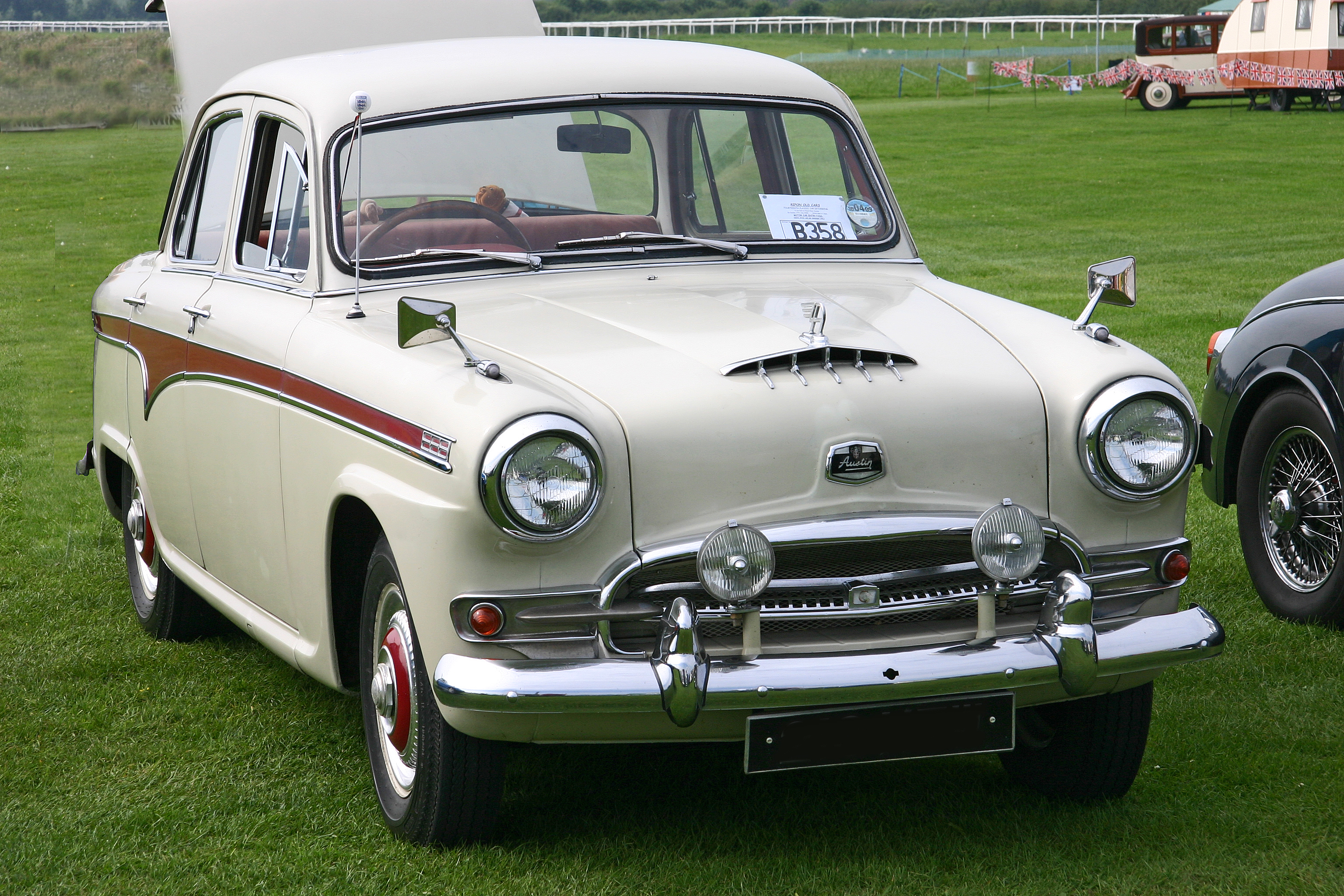
Austin A95

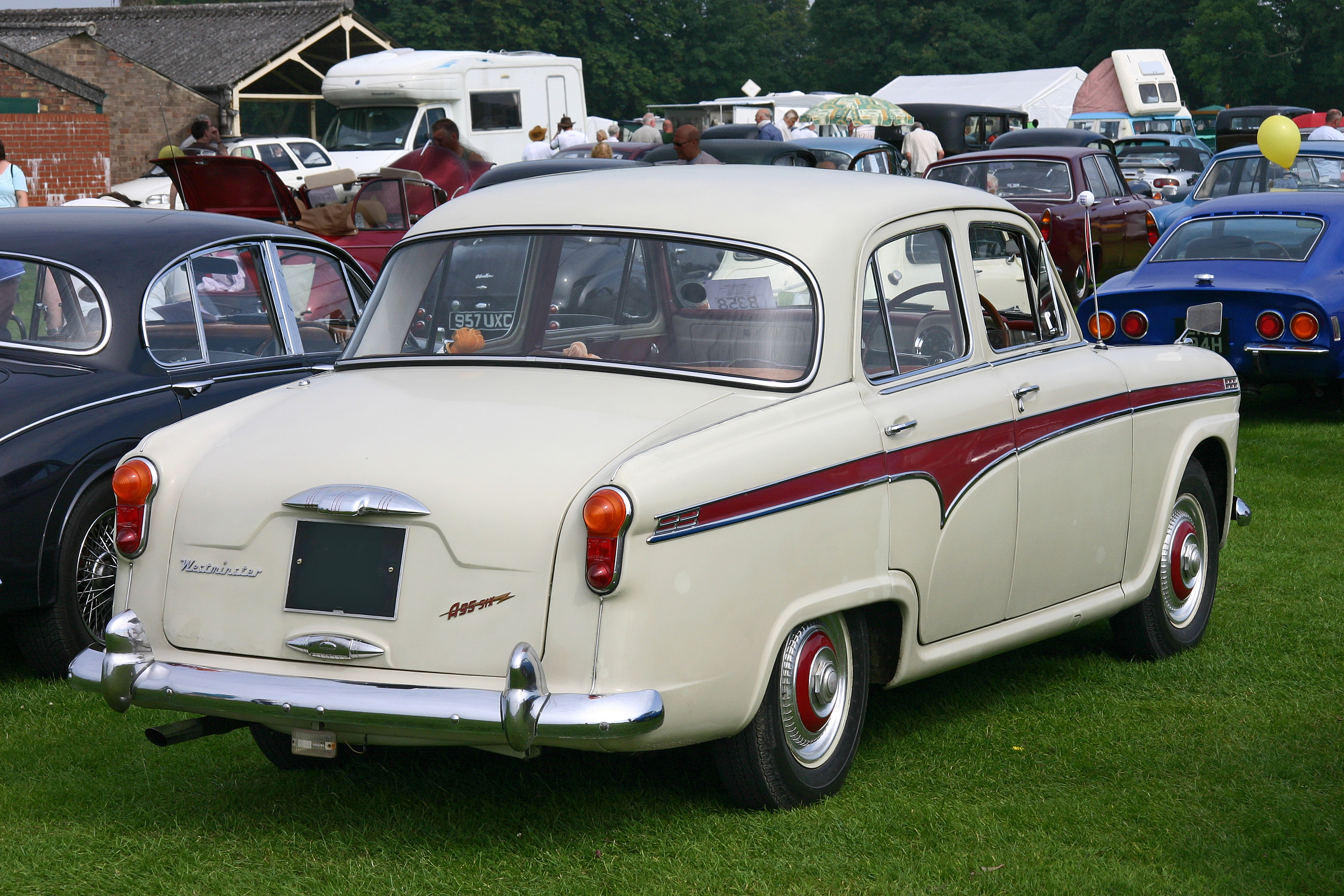
Long boot for A95

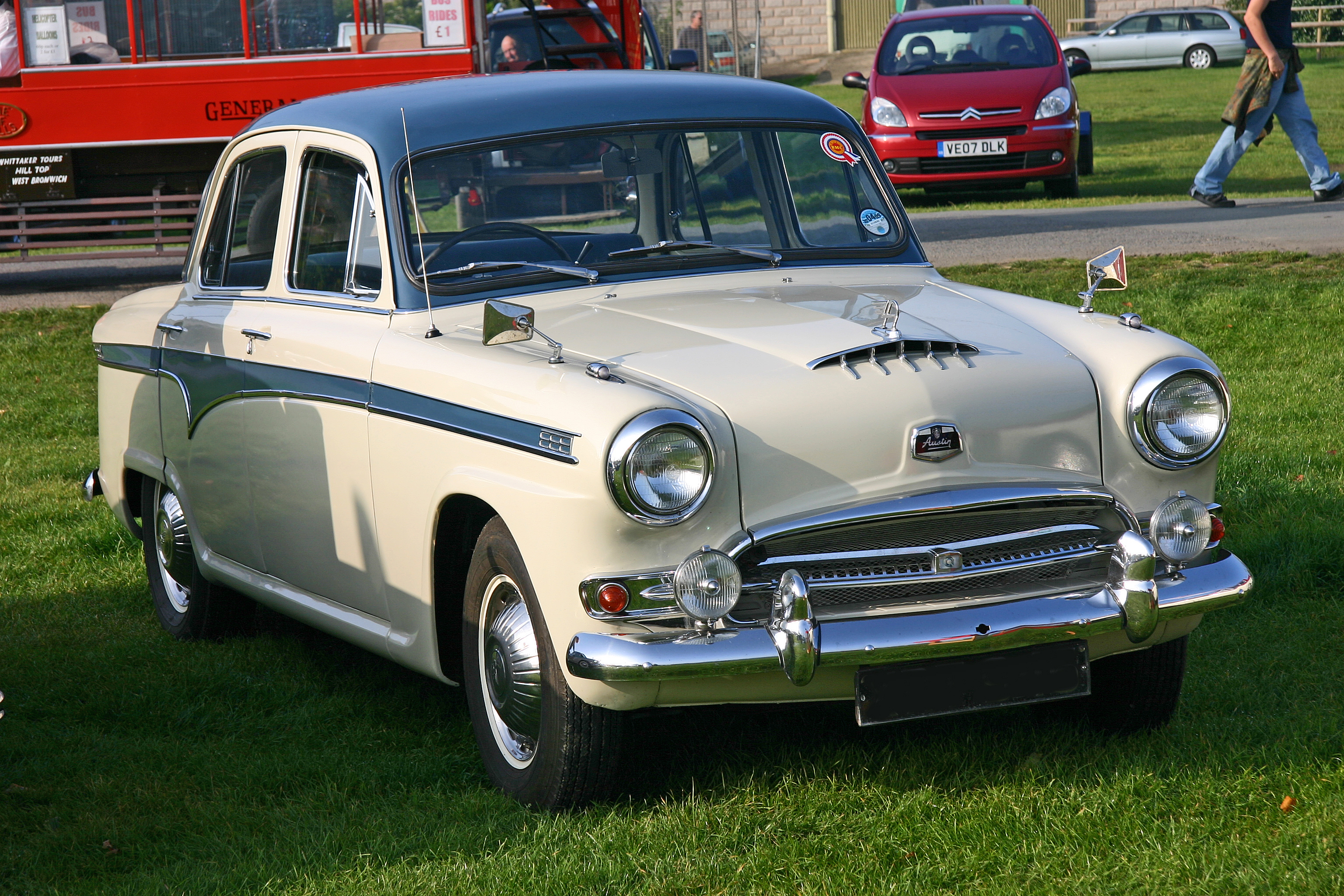
A105 revised

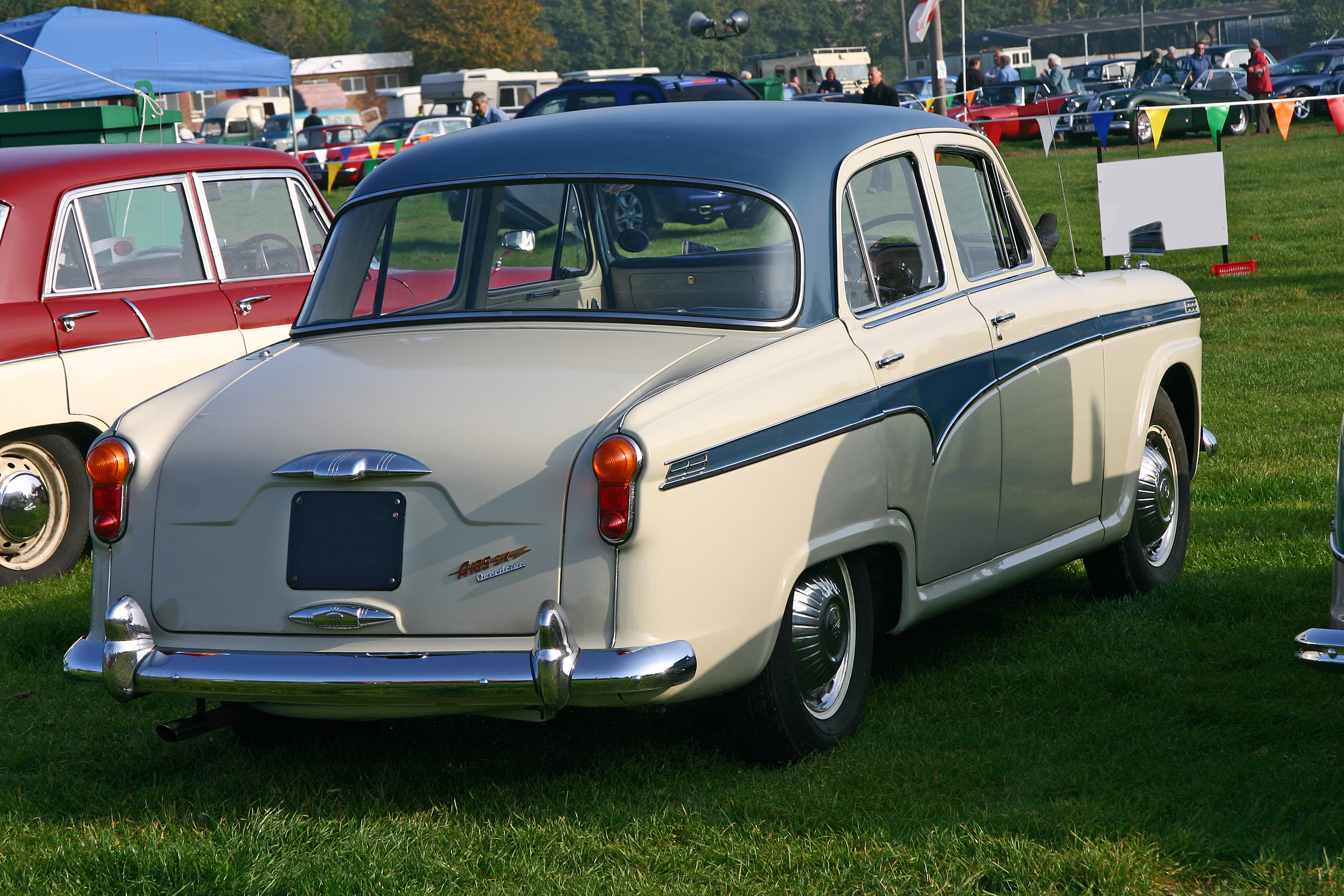
Long boot A105

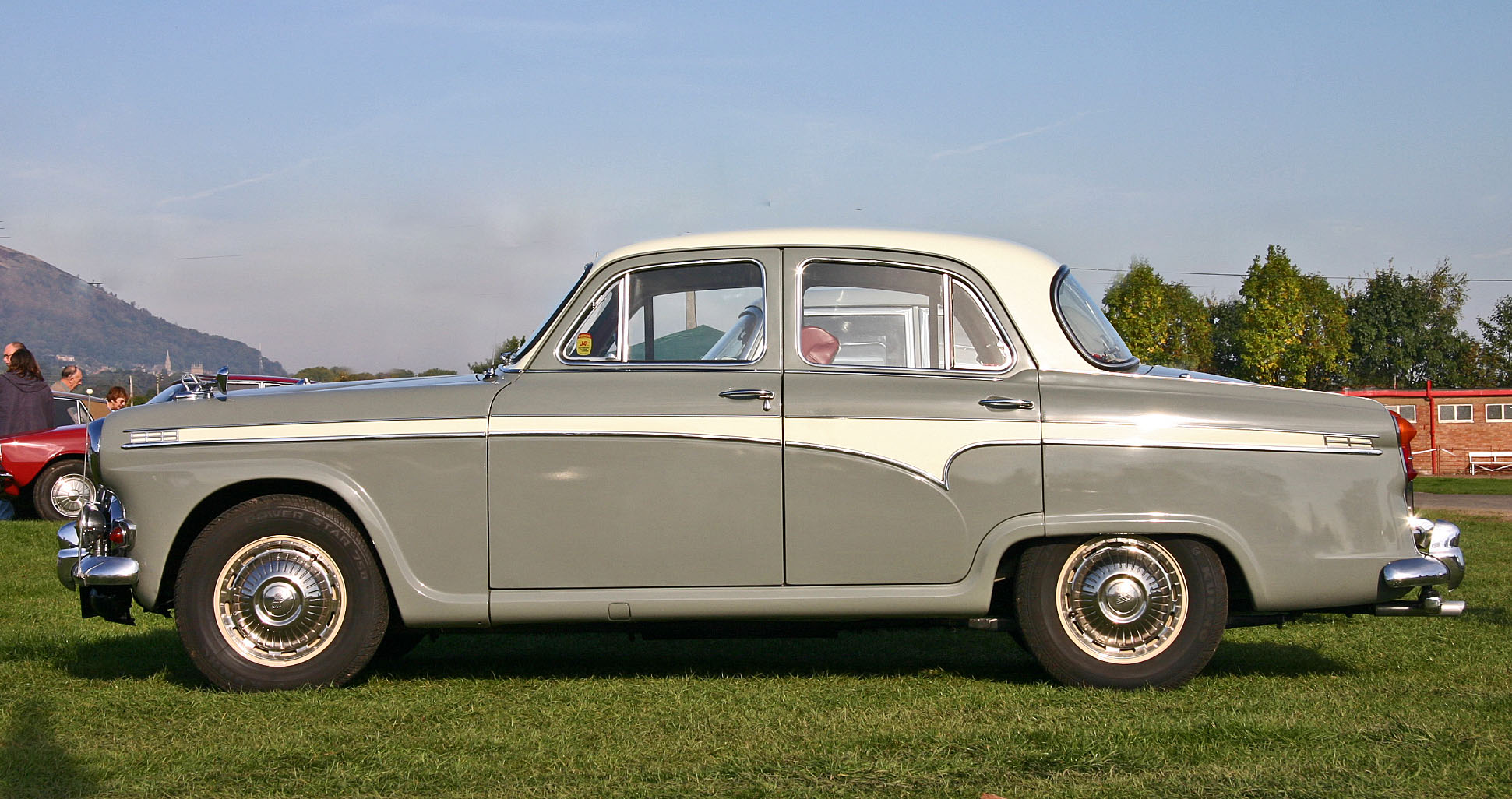
Austin A105. Longer body from 1956

== Austin A105 Vanden Plas ==
The A105 was the first mass-produced Austin family car to be specially upgraded by coachbuilder Vanden Plas, following the success of the large A135 Austin Princess limousine. This was done after a personal request from Leonard Lord in 1957. Changes included significant new interior fittings, and a grey stripe bearing the "Princess" crown on the side of the body; most bodies were in sombre colours such as black or maroon.

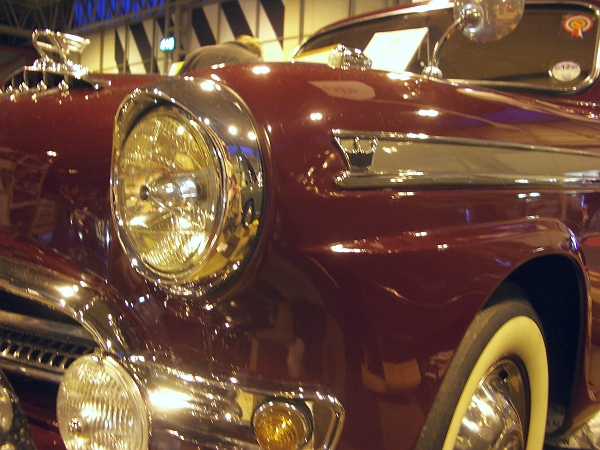
A105 Vanden Plas

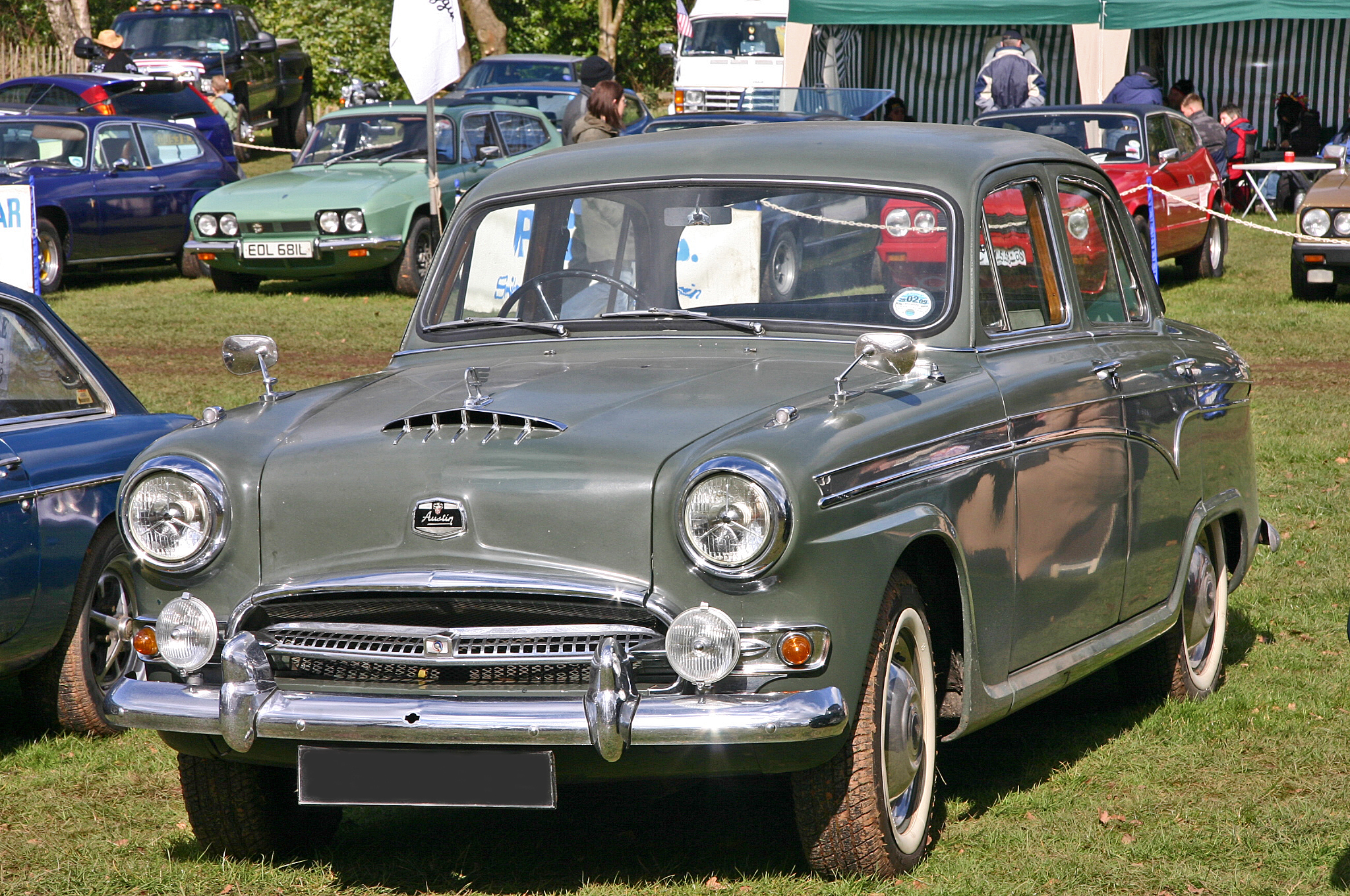
A105 Vanden Plas front

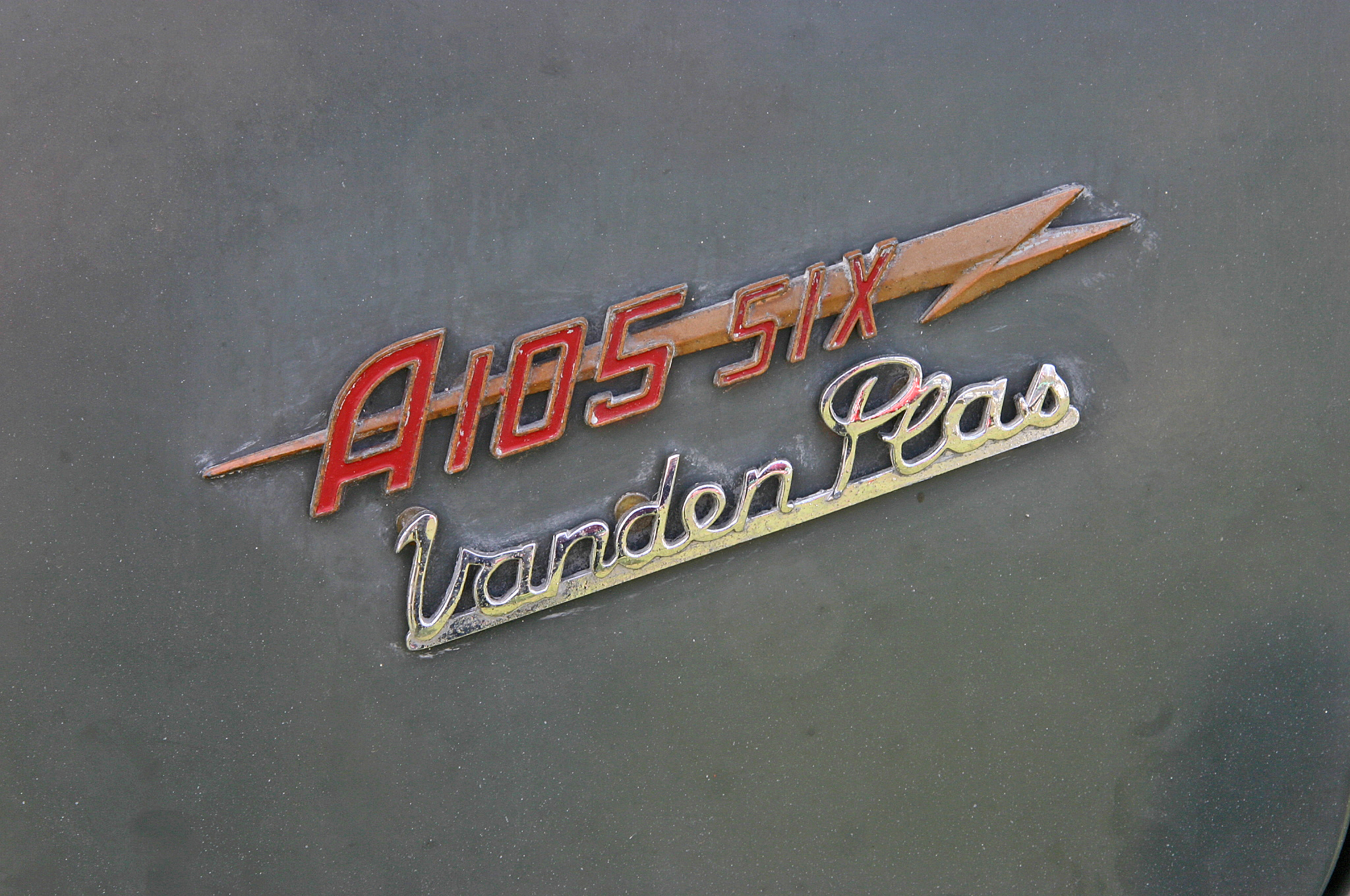
A105 Vanden Plas boot badging

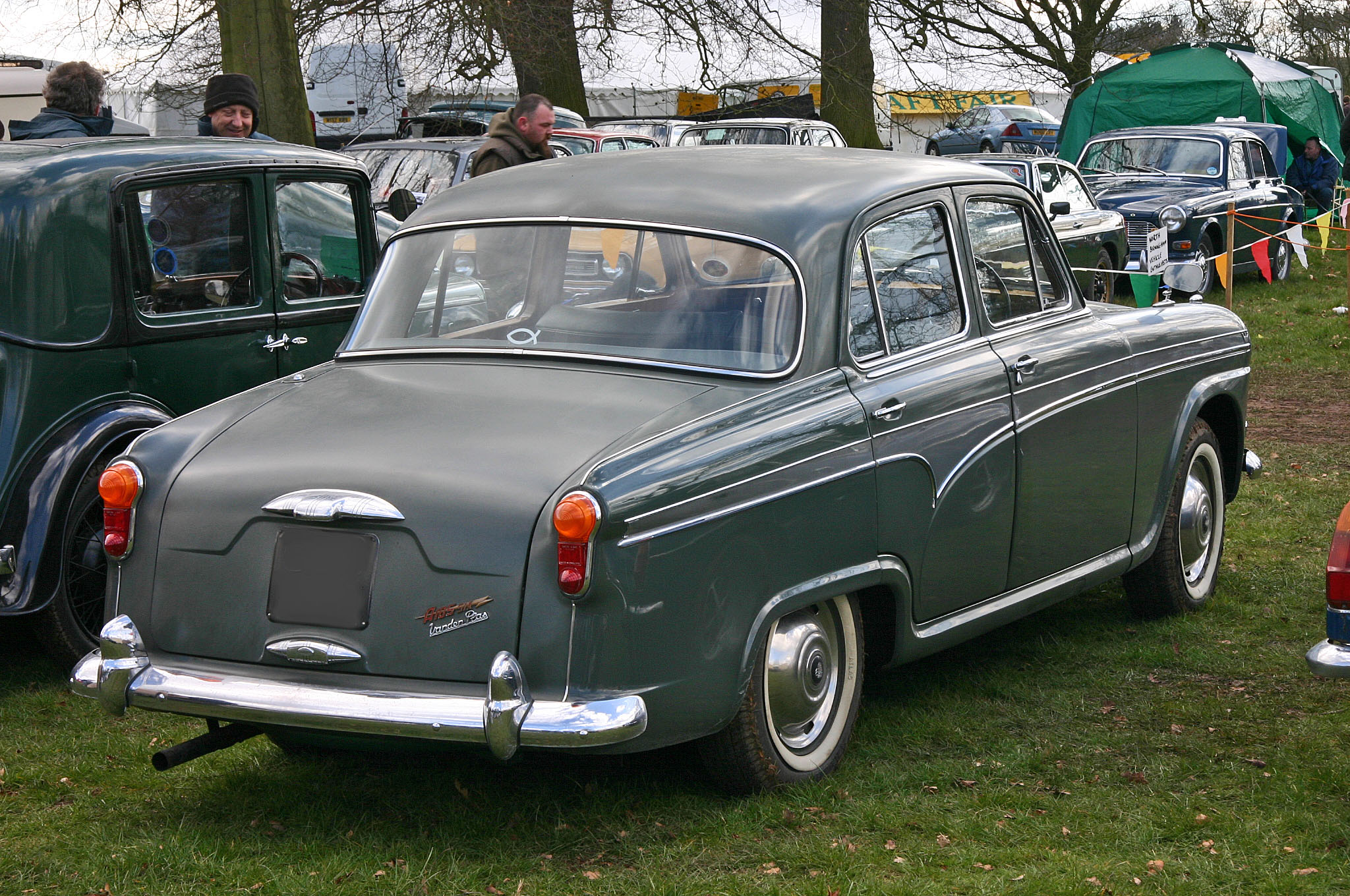
A105 Vanden Plas looks like any A105

== A99 ==
A99
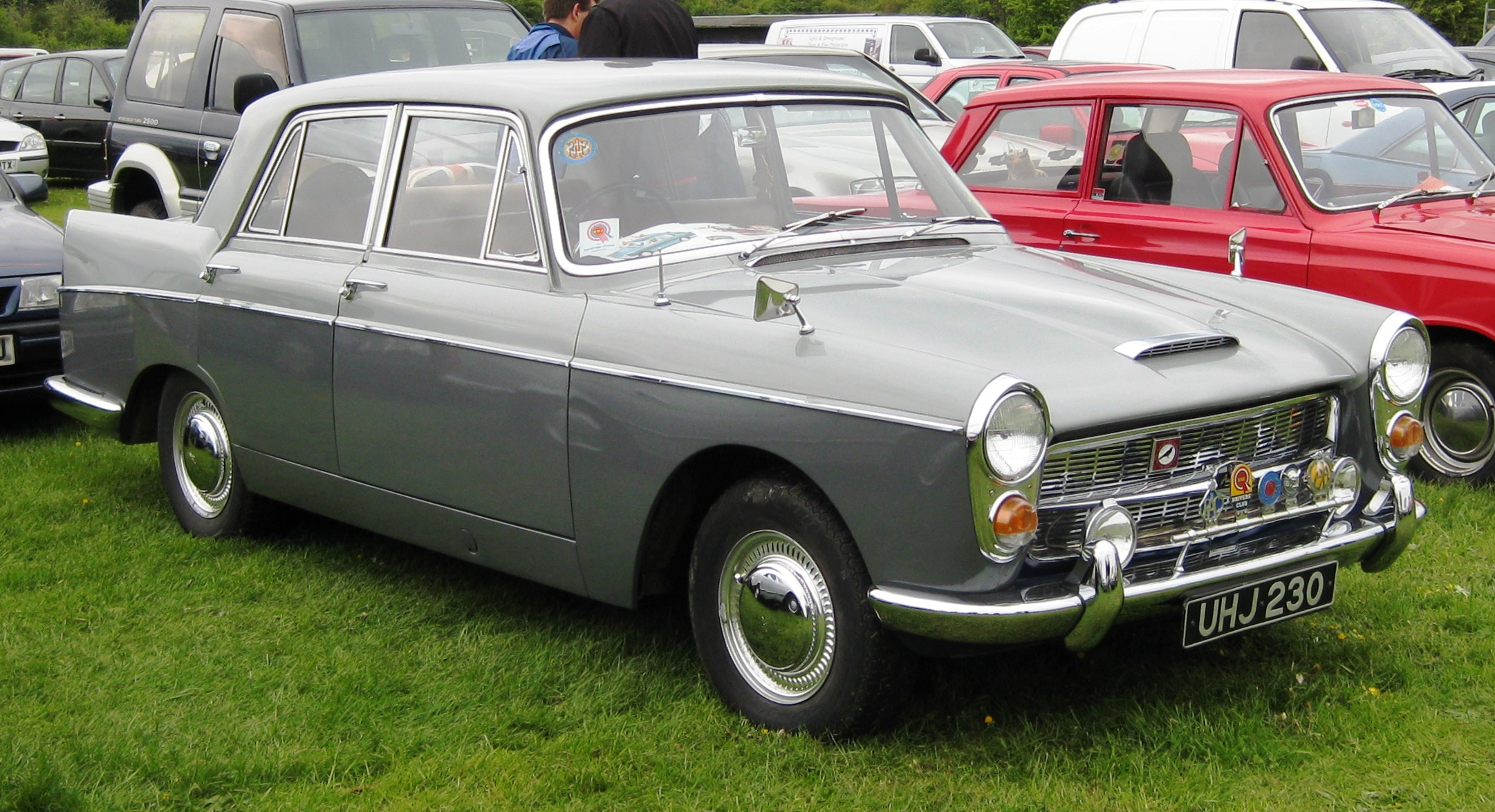

Overview
- Production: 1959–1961
- Assembly: United Kingdom: Longbridge, England; Australia: Sydney (BMC Australia)
- Designer: Pinin Farina

Body and chassis
- Body style: 4-door saloon
- Layout: FR layout
- Related: Wolseley 6/99; Princess 3 Litre; Vanden Plas Princess 3-litre

Powertrain
- Engine: 2.9 L C-Series I6

Dimensions
- Wheelbase: 108 in (2,743 mm)
- Length: 188 in (4,775 mm)
- Width: 68 in (1,727 mm)
- Height: 60 in (1,524 mm)

The A99 Westminster appeared in 1959 with new Pinin Farina-designed bodywork. Pininfarina had also re-styled Austin's compact A40 and mid-sized A55 Cambridge ranges the year before. A very similarly styled bodyshell was also used for the Peugeot 404. It appears that this design, which firstly influenced the Austin and then the Peugeot, was based on the Lancia Flaminia, also designed by Battista Farina earlier. Under the bonnet was the 2.9 L (2912 cc) C-Series straight-6 engine with twin SU carburettors from the Austin-Healey 3000. This engine produced 103 hp (77 kW) in Westminster tune. A three-speed all-synchromesh manual gearbox with a Borg-Warner overdrive unit was fitted as standard, or a Borg-Warner automatic transmission as an option. Power-assisted Lockheed brakes with 10.75 in (273 mm) discs on the front wheels were also new.

An A99 saloon with automatic transmission was tested by the British magazine The Motor in 1960 and they recorded a top speed of 98.1 mph (157.9 km/h), acceleration from 0–60 mph (97 km/h) in 17.9 seconds and a fuel consumption of 23.0 miles per imperial gallon (12.3 L/100 km; 19.2 mpg_{‑US}). The test car cost £1219 including taxes. The manual car cost £1148.

A specially trimmed A99 was sold as the Princess 3-Litre, (note, not an "Austin" Princess – Austin was removed from Princess badging in August 1957 on the larger Princess IV) and later under the Vanden Plas marque as the Vanden Plas Princess. A Wolseley version, the 6/99, was also produced. Production ended in 1961 with the introduction of the larger A110. 15,162 A99s were built.

== A110 ==
A110
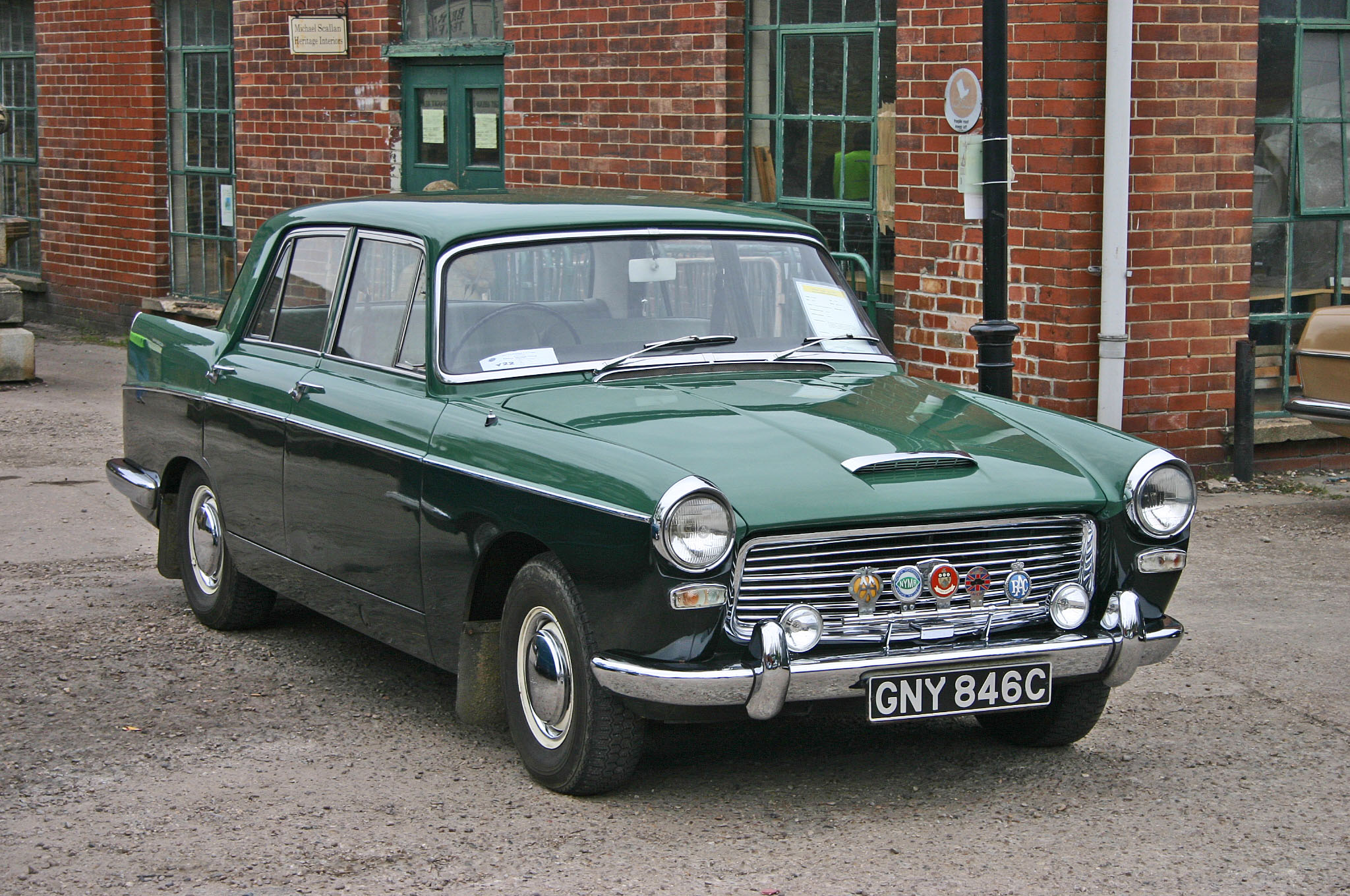

Overview
- Production: 1961–1968
- Assembly: United Kingdom: Longbridge, England

Body and chassis
- Body style: 4-door saloon
- Layout: FR layout
- Related: Wolseley 6/110; Vanden Plas Princess 3-litre Vanden Plas Princess 4-Litre R

Powertrain
- Engine: 2.9 L C-Series I6
- Transmission: 4-speed manual: synchromesh on top 3 ratios Borg Warner 3-speed automatic

Dimensions
- Wheelbase: 110 in (2,794 mm)
- Length: 188 in (4,775 mm)
- Width: 68 in (1,727 mm)

The final major update arrived in 1961 with the A110 Westminster. This version had an extended (by 2 in/51 mm) wheelbase, which allowed more space in the rear compartment as well as improving the roadholding, a floor-mounted gear lever. 13 in wheels were substituted in 1964's Mark II models. Wolseley produced a 6/110 version, and there was a Vanden Plas Princess Mark II with the C-Series engine, now uprated to 120 hp (89 kW). The same basic body was also used for a Rolls-Royce-engined Vanden Plas Princess, and the body even formed part of a prototype Bentley.

The Westminster range was finally replaced by the Austin 3-Litre in 1968. 26,105 A110s were built.

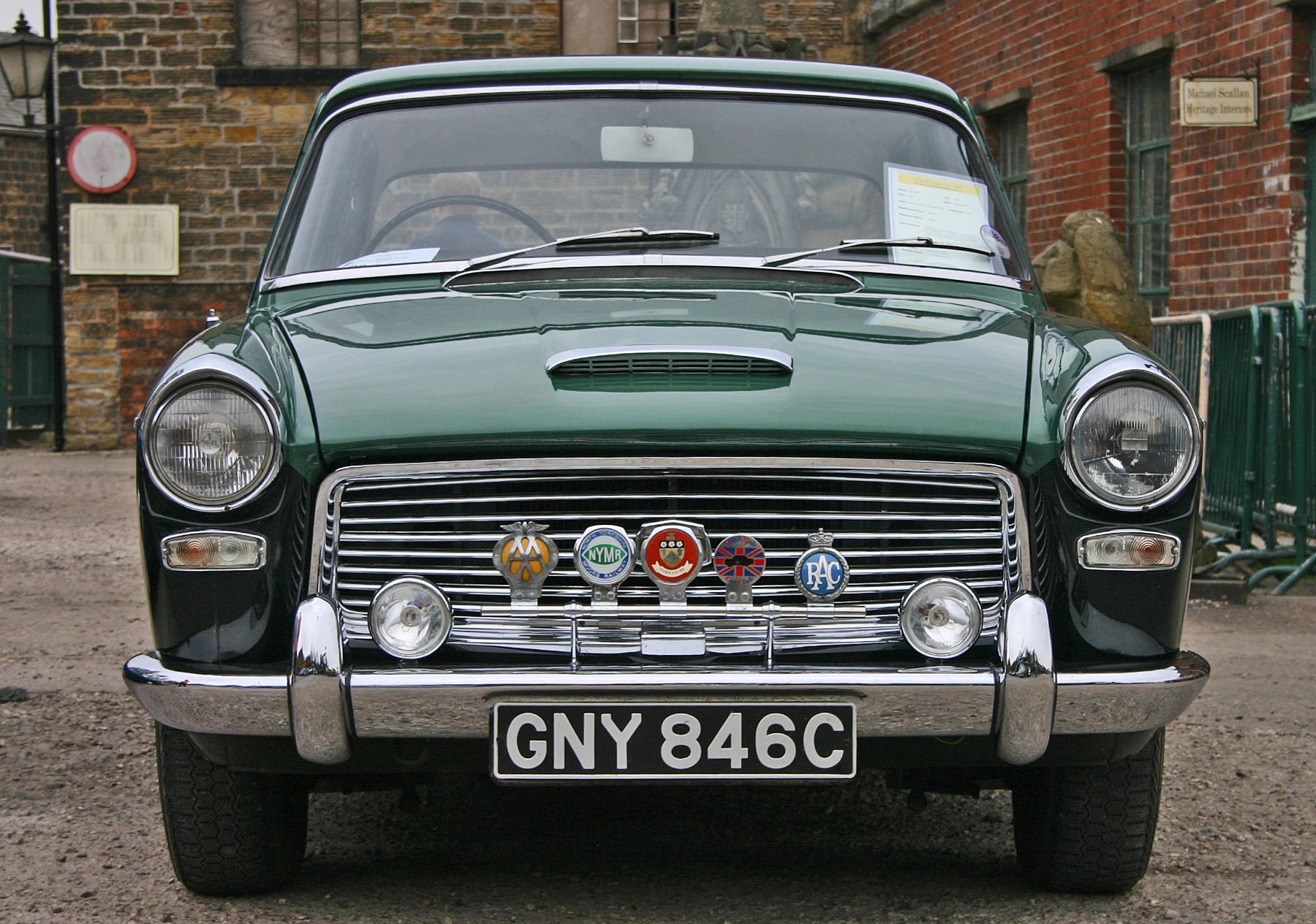
Austin A110 Westminster Mark II – the biggest "Farina" Austin

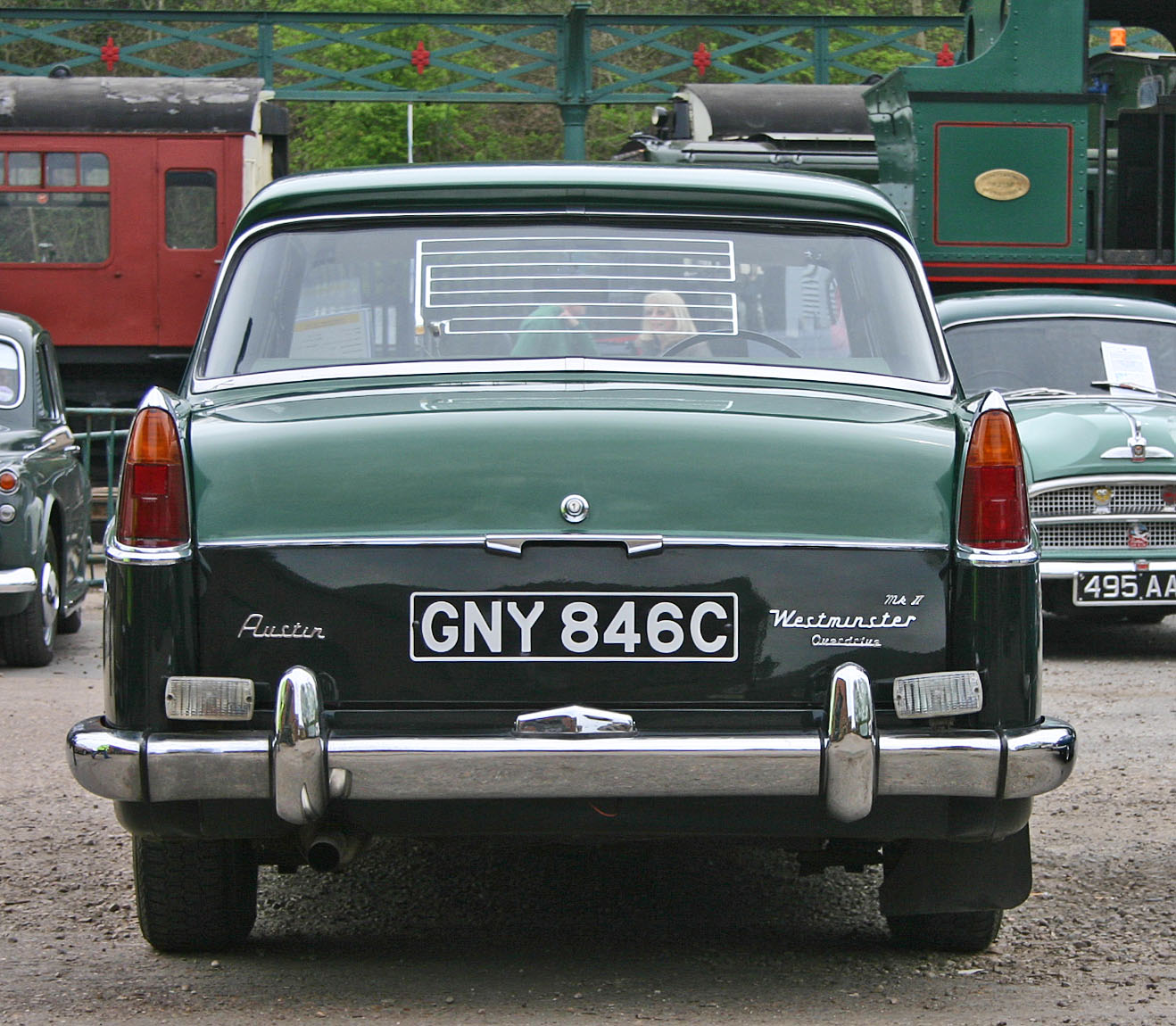

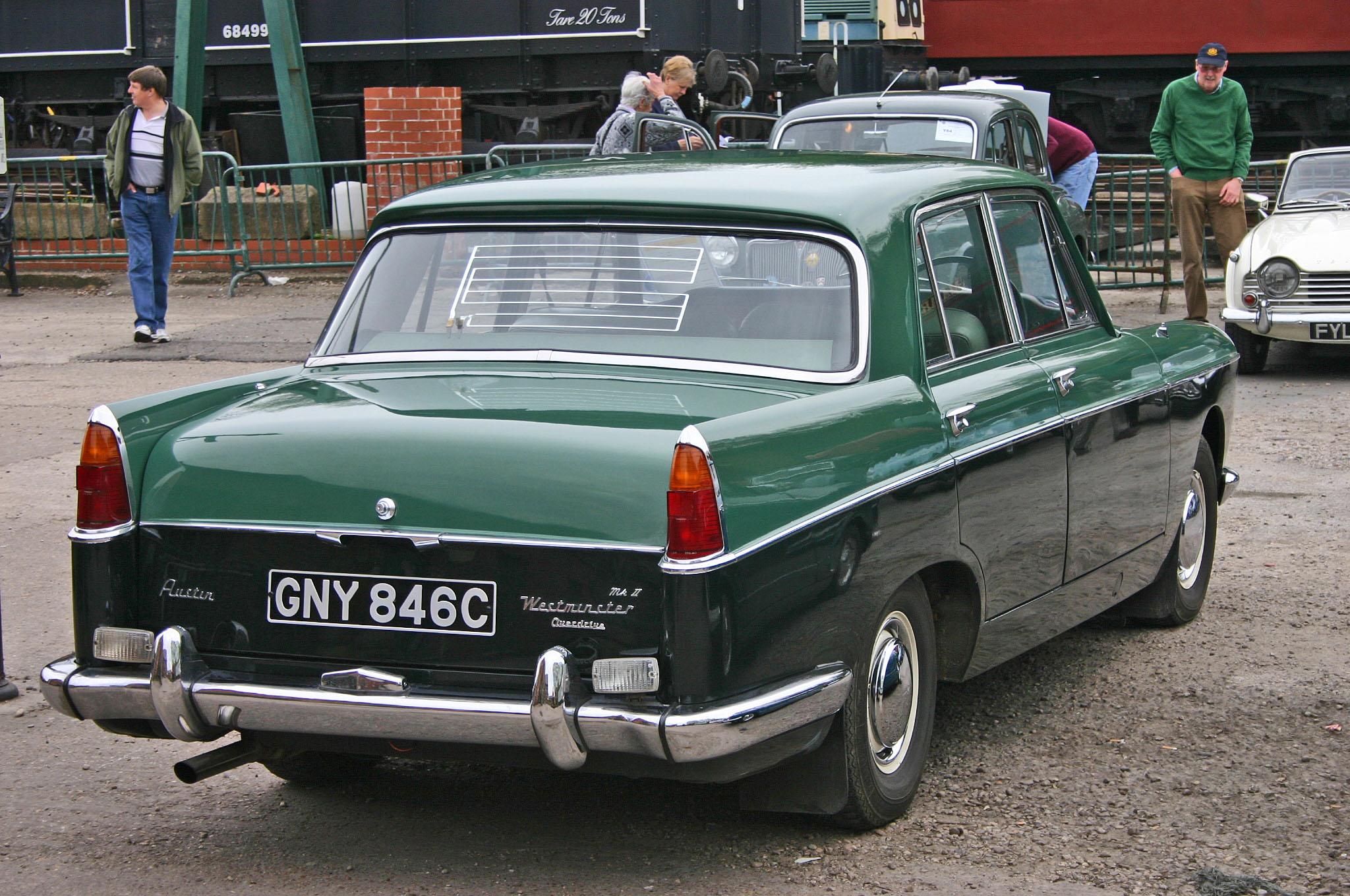

== Scale models and die-cast ==
- Meccano Dinky Toys; No. 176 (production 1958–1963), Austin A105 Westminster, approximately O scale (1:44).

== See also ==
- Austin Princess
