= Austin Princess =

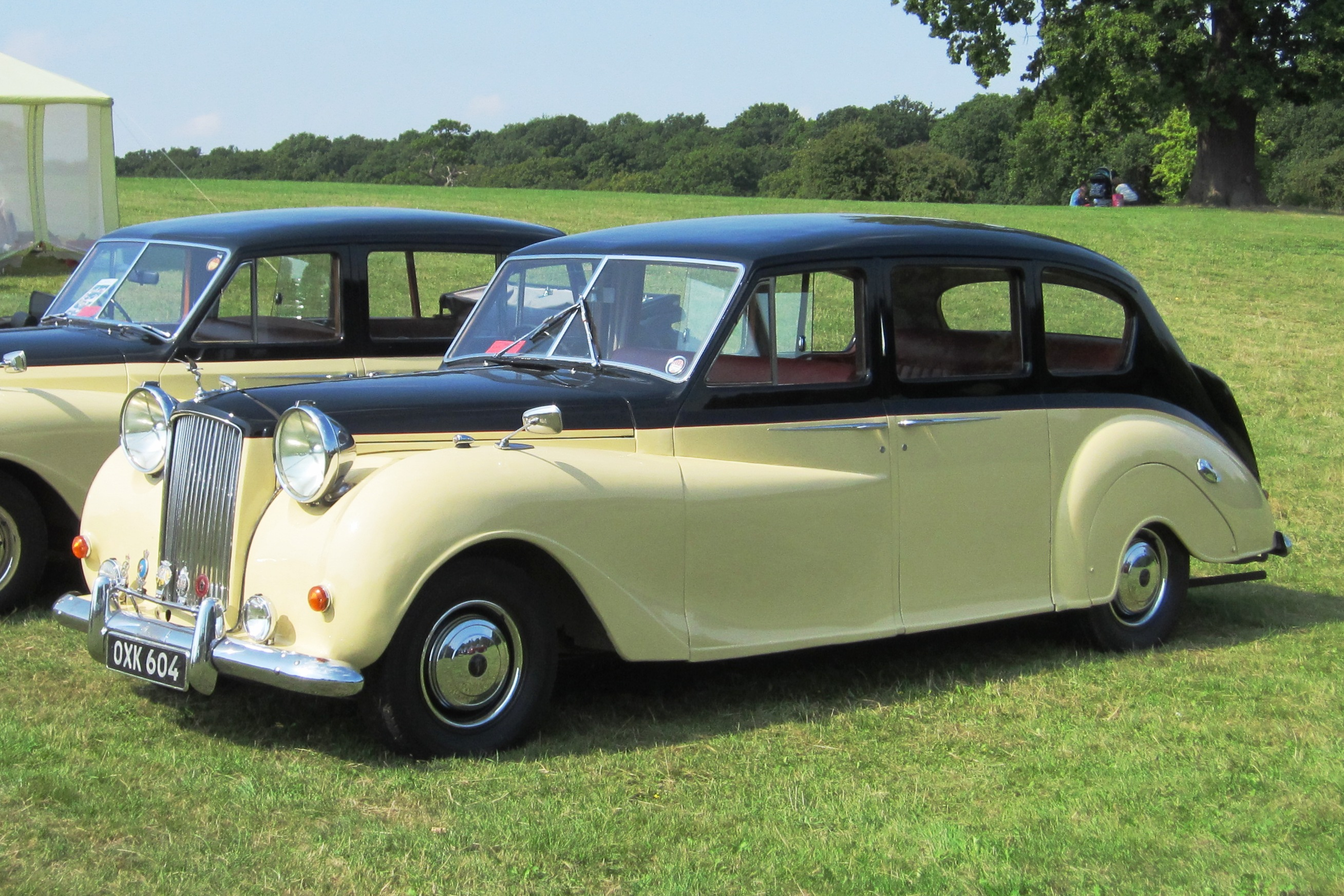
- Austin Princess III 3995cc, registered March 1954. This car is not completely representative, having special "bespoke" headlights.

Overview
- Manufacturer: Austin/Vanden Plas (BMC)
- Also called: Princess (1957–1960); Vanden Plas Princess (1960–1968)
- Production: 1947–1968

Body and chassis
- Class: Full-size luxury car
- Body style: 4-door saloon 4-door limousine
- Related: Austin Sheerline

Chronology
- Predecessor: Austin 28 Ranelagh
- Successor: Daimler DS420

The Austin Princess is a series of large luxury cars that were made by Austin and its subsidiary Vanden Plas from 1947 to 1968. The cars were also marketed under the Princess and Vanden Plas marque names.

The Princess name was also used as follows:

- From October 1959, the name Princess was used on a deluxe version of BMC's full-sized executive cars badged as an Austin Westminster, Vanden Plas Princess and Wolseley 6/99-6/110
- From October 1962, Princess was used on a deluxe version of the Austin/Morris 1300.
- From September 1975, Princess was used as a name for mass-produced family cars in Leyland's 1800/2200 former Austin/Morris/Wolseley range.

== Naming ==
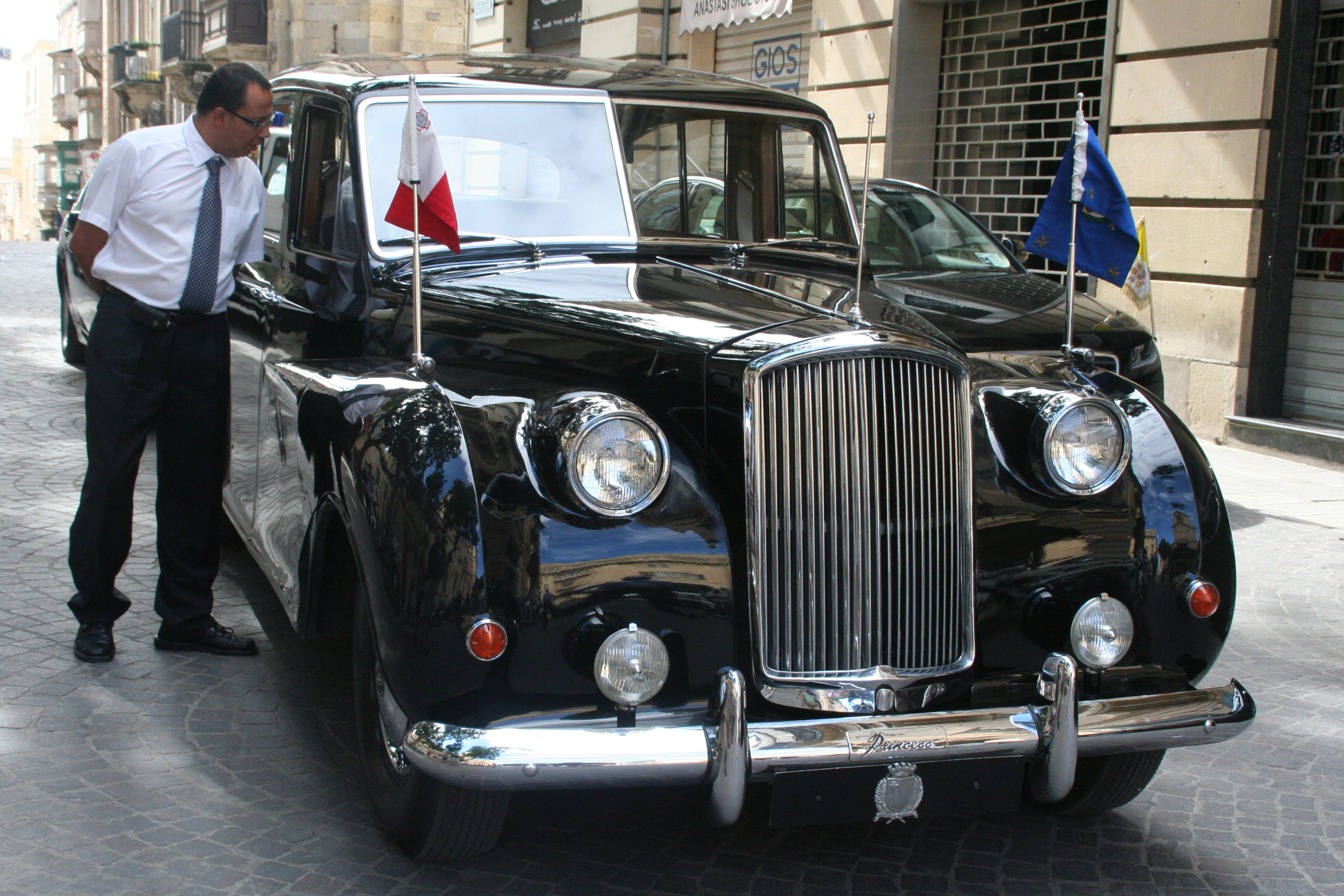
State car of the President of Malta

The first Austin Princess A120 was launched in 1947 as the most expensive flagship model in the Austin range at the same time as the A110 Austin Sheerline (designed during the war) which body was built on the same chassis at Longbridge, the A110 produced 10 less horsepower being fitted with a single carburettor. Both cars always had bodies that were massive and heavy in appearance. The Princess (model code A120) featured a body by the coachbuilder Vanden Plas and was a large saloon or limousine. The car was offered with two distinct interiors. The "DM" or limousine type had a sliding glass partition between the driver and rear passengers plus picnic tables, and the "DS" was the saloon. The saloons were successful as a top-executive car, many Princesses (and Sheerlines, for that matter) were bought for civic ceremonial duties or by hire companies as limousines for hire. The standard saloon weighed almost two tons, was 16 ft 9 inches long and 6 feet 1¼ inches wide on a 10-foot 1¼-inch (the short) wheelbase.

The Princess model was updated over the years through Mark I (A120), Mark II (A135) and Mark III versions, the largest variation being the introduction of the long-wheelbase version in 1952 with a longer body and seven seats: apart from that the bodywork and running gear hardly changed, nor did the D-Series 4-litre straight-6 engine. The radiator was fairly upright in old-fashioned style and the car had separate front wings, but these cars were always more modern in style than the equivalent-sized Bentley Mark VI or Rolls-Royce Silver Cloud and, for the saloon, the price was just a little more than two-thirds of the Rolls-Royce.

From August 1957 the Austin part of the badging was dropped so it could be sold by Nuffield dealerships as "Princess". From May 1960, the Vanden Plas name was added in front of "Princess".

== Austin Princess I, II and III ==
Austin A120-135 Princess I, II and III
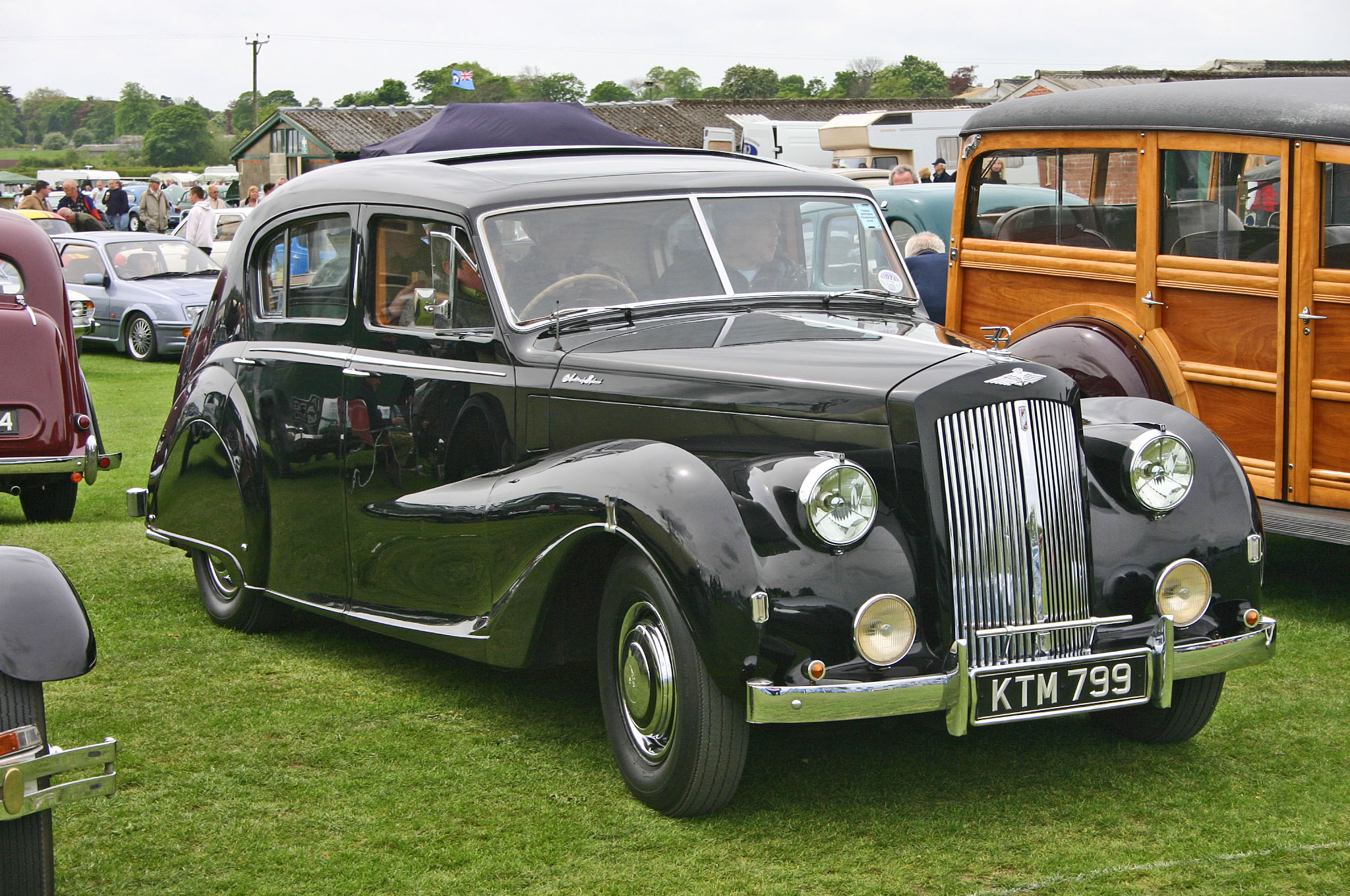
- Austin A135 Princess II (DS3)

Overview
- Manufacturer: Austin (BMC)
- Production: Princess 1: 1947–1950; DM2 (SWB limousine): 57; DS2 (SWB Saloon): 743; Princess II: 1950–1953; DM3 (SWB limo): Unknown; DS3 (SWB Saloon): Unknown; Princess III: 1953–1956; DM5 (SWB limousine): 51; DS5 (SWB Saloon): 299

Powertrain
- Engine: Austin D-Series 3460cc and 3991cc 6-cylinder

Dimensions
- Wheelbase: 132 in (3,353 mm)(long-wheelbase)
- Length: 215 in (5,461 mm)(long-wheelbase)
- Width: 74 in (1,880 mm)
- Height: 70 in (1,778 mm)

In 1947, Austin produced two virtually identical chassis, one for the A110 (later A125) Sheerline, built entirely by Austin at their Longbridge factory and the A120 (later A135) chassis used by Vanden Plas to produce the Princess at their Kingsbury works (North London). Although Vanden Plas was by now wholly owned by Austin and much of the running gear and instrumentation was the same in the two cars, the Princess was the Austin flagship, with a higher specification leather, wool and burr walnut interior.

The original Princess was powered by a 3.5-litre straight-six engine. This was enlarged to a 4.0-litre unit without further modifications. The Princess was often built to order. Customers could specify the colour required and a range of different setups were available. These included triple or single carburettors and twin or single exhaust systems. Whilst the sportier multiple carb version performed better, it achieved only 12 to 14 mpg. The single carburettor version gave slightly better fuel consumption. Performance was good for a car of its size, with a top speed of 90 mph (140 km/h) and acceleration from 0 to 60 mph in 20 seconds. In 1950, the Limousine version was introduced. The chassis length and passenger area were enlarged to enable a pair of drop down seats to be mounted on the rear of the front seats and a glass division was standard.

These early cars are now extremely rare, especially the saloon versions. Many of the saloons were converted for use as taxis in the late 1950s, fitted with Perkins diesel engines for better economy. The 3993cc 6-cylinder engine was also fitted, as a petrol option seldom taken up, to the Austin and Morris normal-control (i.e. "bonneted") WEK and WFK commercial vehicles.

During the life of this model (in 1952), Austin became part of the British Motor Corporation (BMC).

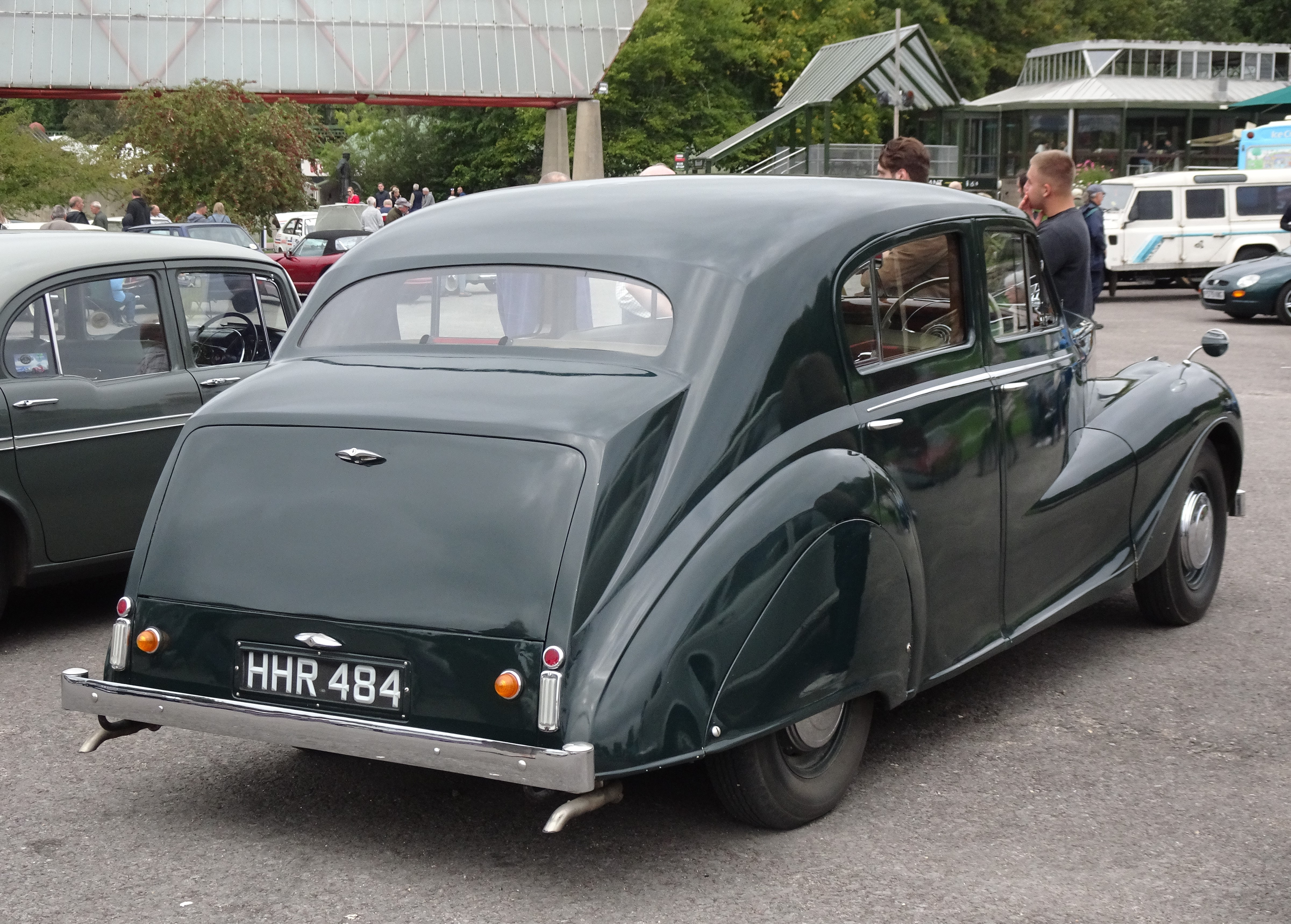
Austin A135 Princess II (DS3)

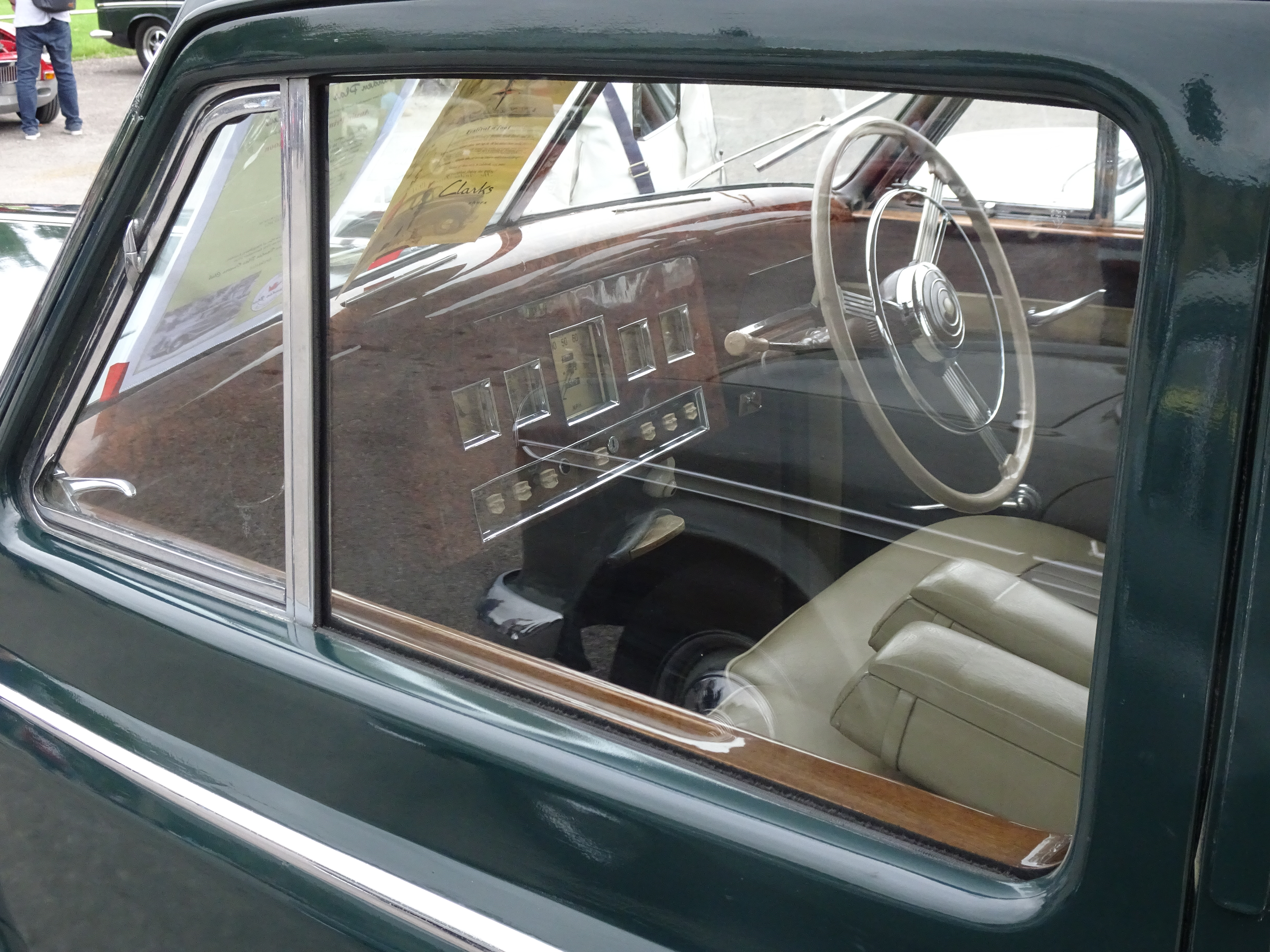
Austin A135 Princess II (DS3) interior

== Austin Princess IV and Princess IV ==
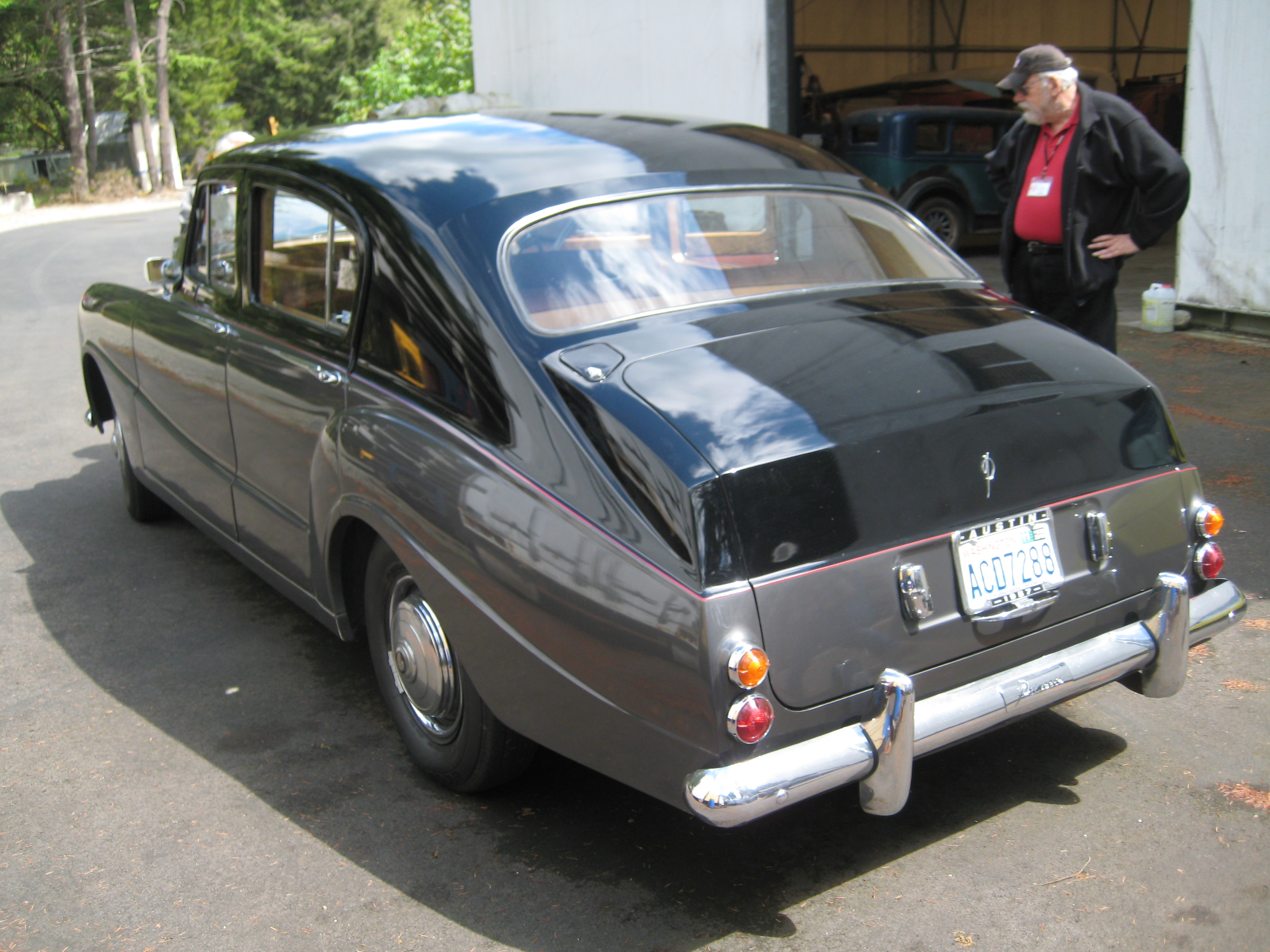
Princess IV rear view

Austin Princess IV (1956–57) Princess IV (1957–1959)
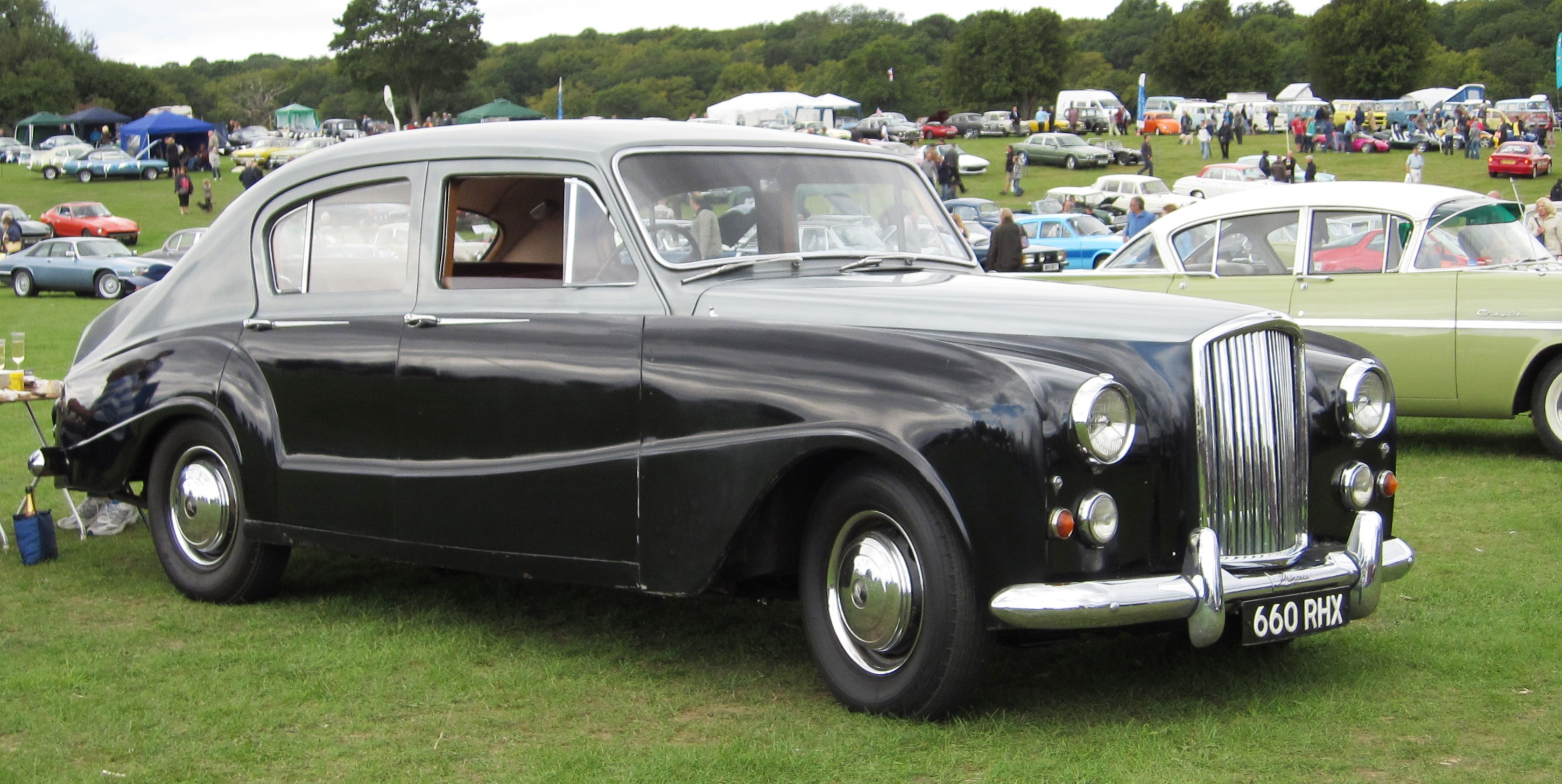
- 1958 Princess IV

Overview
- Manufacturer: Vanden Plas (BMC)
- Production: 1956–1959; DS7 Saloon: 175; DM7 Limousine: 24

Body and chassis
- Class: Full-size luxury car
- Body style: 4-door saloon

Powertrain
- Engine: Austin D-Series 3991cc 6-cylinder
- Transmission: 4-speed automatic

Dimensions
- Wheelbase: 121 3/4 in (3,092 mm)
- Length: 201 in (5.11 m)
- Width: 73 3/4 in (1.87 m)
- Height: 65 3/4 in (1.67 m)
- Kerb weight: 39¾ Cwt 4,452–4,452 lb (2,019–2,019 kg)

Chronology
- Predecessor: Princess 125 and 135
- Successor: none

The Austin Princess IV was introduced in 1956. Offered in Saloon (DS7) and Touring Limousine (DM7) models, this replacement for the former Sheerline and A135 only stayed in the catalogue until 1959; 199 were built.

The engine was the Austin D-Series straight six with redesigned cylinder head and was fitted with twin SU HD6 carburettors. The power output was 150 bhp. A GM Hydramatic automatic gearbox and Girling power-assisted steering were fitted as standard.

The luxurious interior now featured redesigned dashboard with instruments directly in front of the driver rather than in the centre.

The last A135 Mark 3 had been priced at five times the price of an Austin A30. The new IV had to be priced at 6.5 times the price of an Austin A30, at which price there was almost no demand. The name was shortened in August 1957 when the car lost its "Austin" designation, now being branded simply as the Princess IV so it might be sold by either Morris or Austin dealers. The Times tested the Princess IV and reported on it at some length in early February 1959.

The Princess IV was discontinued in 1959 and replaced in the catalogue by a much smaller model, the Princess 3-litre, which retailed at little more than 40 per cent of the Mark IV's price. This was an upgraded version of the Pininfarina-designed Austin A99 Westminster.

A Princess IV was road tested by The Autocar magazine on 3 October 1958, as No.1703 in the series. The engine was rated at 150 bhp (gross) and it returned a maximum speed of 98.7 mph, under the test conditions prevailing.

== Austin Princess, Princess and Vanden Plas Princess Long Wheelbase Limousine (or Saloon) ==
Austin Princess Princess Vanden Plas Princess
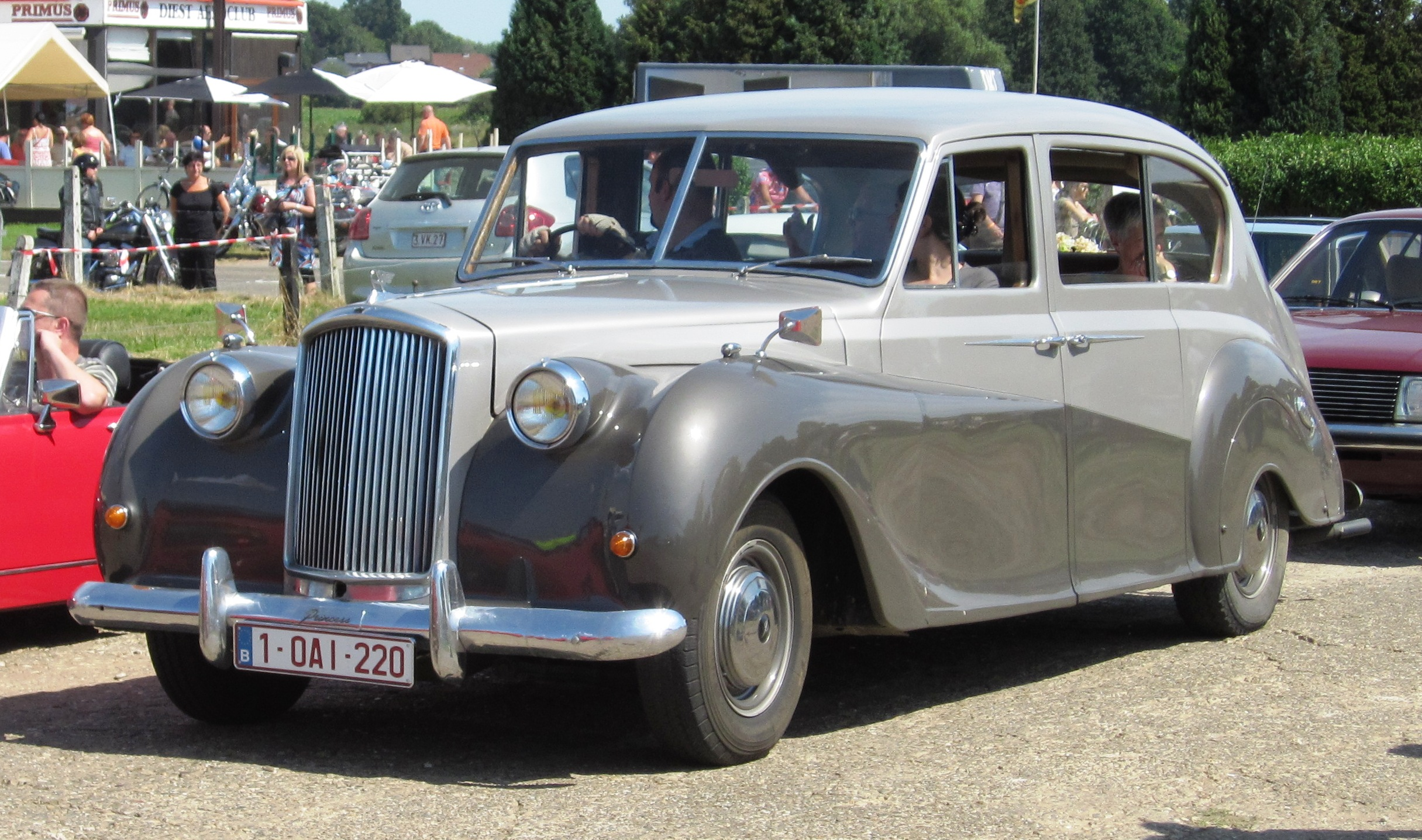

Overview
- Production: 1952–1968; DM4 Limousine: 3,238; DM4 Landaulette: 18; DS6 Saloon: 88

Body and chassis
- Related: Austin Sheerline

Powertrain
- Engine: Austin D-Series 3991cc 6-cylinder

Dimensions
- Wheelbase: 132 in (3.35 m) long-wheelbase
- Length: 215 in (5.46 m) long-wheelbase
- Width: 73 in (1.85 m)
- Height: 70 in (1.78 m)

Chronology
- Successor: Daimler DS420

The Austin A135 Princess Long Wheelbase Saloon (DS6) and Limousine (DM4) were introduced in 1952. The GM Hydramatic 4-speed automatic transmission and Hydrosteer power steering from Princess IV were fitted from 1956 as options. The marque name was changed from Austin to Princess in August 1957, and then to Vanden Plas from July 1960. The long wheelbase models continued to be built by hand in limited numbers as the Vanden Plas Princess 4-litre Limousine, until 1968. All now being parts of British Leyland, the Jaguar Mark X-based Daimler DS420 was initially produced at the Vanden Plas works in Kingsbury, North London then replaced the Vanden Plas Princess within the new, slightly rationalised range. This had been foreseen in 1966 when British Motor Holdings (BMH) had brought BMC and Jaguar together, and stopped development at Vanden Plas of the potential successor car. The limousine was luxuriously appointed with much polished wood, optional mohair rugs and radio with controls in the armrest. Among the long list of available extras were monograms and a flagstaff. The driving compartment was separated from the rear of the car by a division with an optional telephone for the passengers to communicate with the driver. The driving seat was finished in leather and the rear seats were usually trimmed in 'West of England' cloth, the usual arrangement on many luxury cars of the time. Though not as durable as leather, cloth was considered kinder to passengers' clothes. To increase seating capacity two occasional seats could be folded out of the floor.

The car had independent coil suspension at the front with semi elliptic leaf springs and anti-roll bar at the rear. The cam and peg type steering gear had optional power assistance.

An Austin A135 Princess Long-wheelbase Limousine tested by The Motor magazine in 1953 had a top speed of 79 mph (127 km/h) and could accelerate from 0-60 mph (97 km/h) in 23.3 seconds. A fuel consumption of 15.1 miles per imperial gallon (18.7 L/100 km; 12.6 mpg_{‑US}) was recorded. The test car cost £2480 including taxes.

An automatic Limousine was tested by the British magazine The Motor in 1962 and had a top speed of 86.2 mph (138.7 km/h) and could accelerate from 0-60 mph (97 km/h) in 23.5 seconds. A fuel consumption of 15.8 miles per imperial gallon (17.9 L/100 km; 13.2 mpg_{‑US}) was recorded. The test car cost £3,473 including taxes.

== Popular culture ==
At the height of Beatlemania, Austin Princess limousines were the Beatles' preferred mode of transport. According to their chauffeur/roadie, Mal Evans, the Princess was chosen because the wide coach doors opened allowing the Beatles to dive into the car to escape crowds of fans.

John Lennon owned a 1956 Austin Princess Hearse which he bought secondhand from a mortuary in 1971 to use as his personal limousine for a few years. The hearse was famously used by Lennon and Yoko Ono in the 1972 promotional film Imagine that accompanied the album. Shortly after filming he customized the hearse by adding five airline seats in the rear of the hearse, (complete with ashtray arms).

A 1964 Austin Princess was used during the state funeral of Winston Churchill, carrying his coffin through London from Festival Pier to Waterloo Station. The hearse survives and has been restored and put back into funeral service.

On March 20, 1974, Princess Anne was returning to Buckingham Palace from a film premiere in a 1969 Austin Vanden Plas Princess Limousine when a lone gunman attempted to kidnap her. Several shots were fired into the car causing the Princess' bodyguard and chauffeur to both be shot and injured, but Princess Anne was fortunately unharmed despite being manhandled by the assailant. (This particular Austin Vanden Plas Princess was one of the last Princess limousines to roll off the production line in 1969 and delivered to the Royal Mews in 1972. As they went out of production, two were put aside for the use of junior members of the Royal Family for official engagements.)

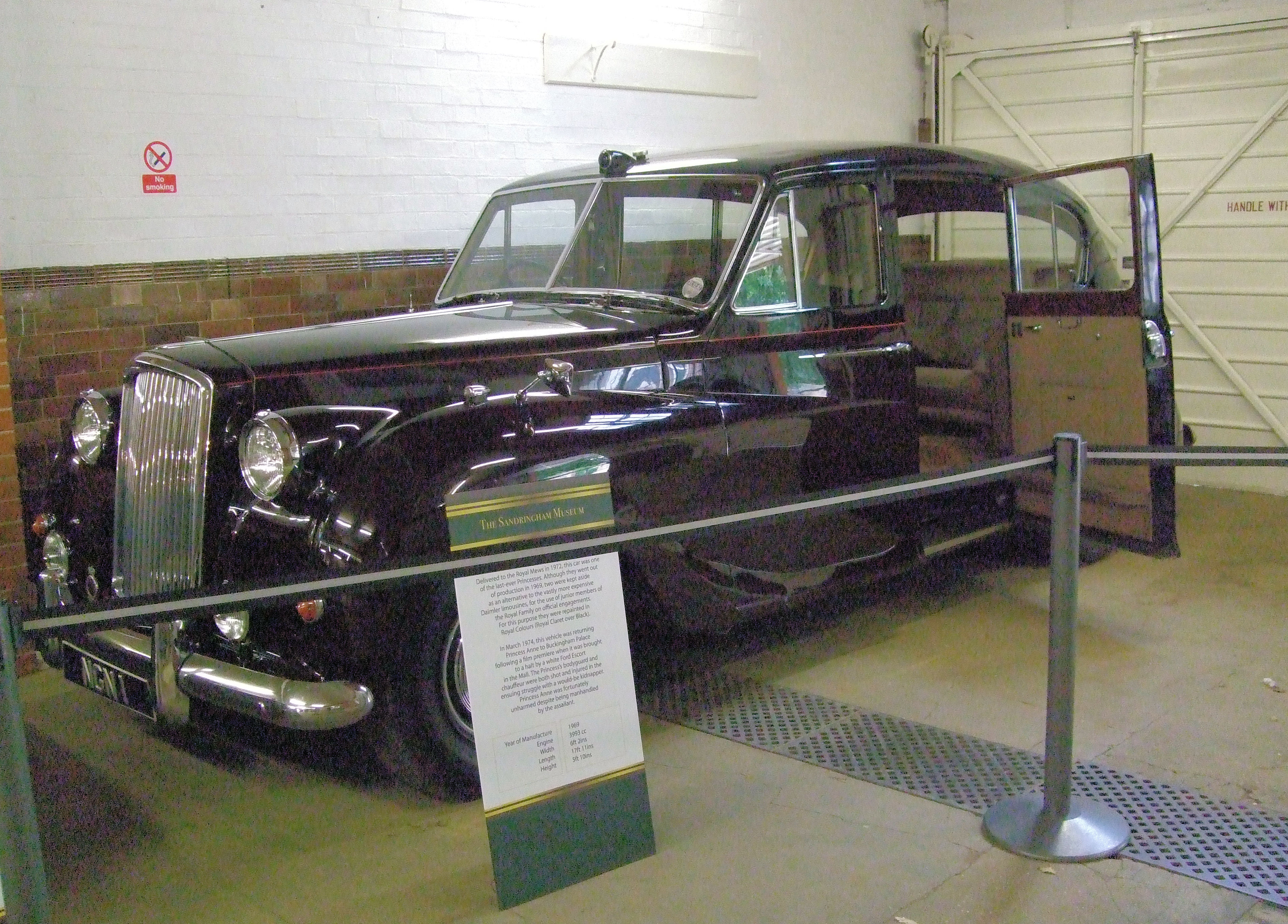
1969 Princess at Sandringham House

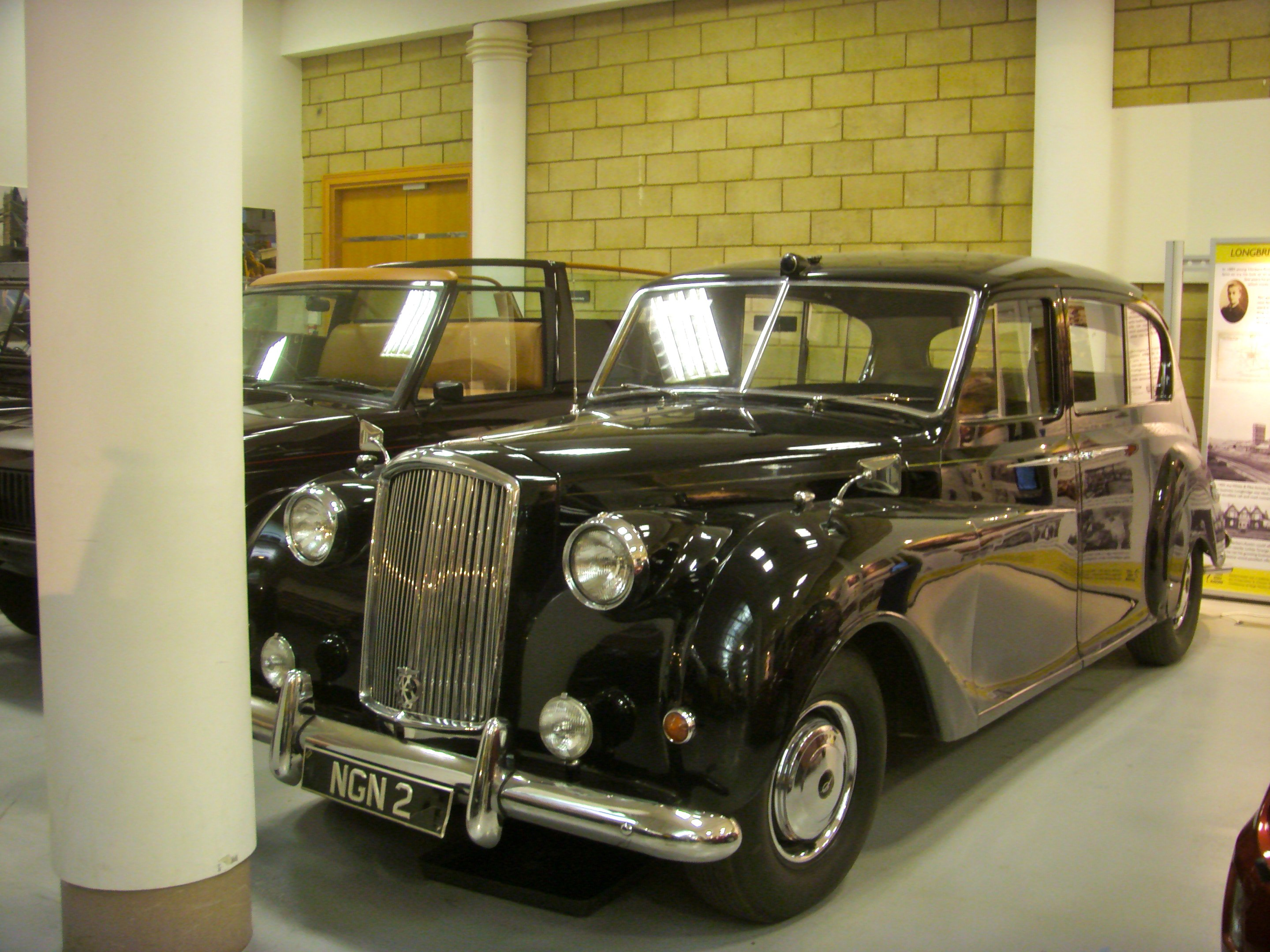
1969 Princess at the British Motor Museum

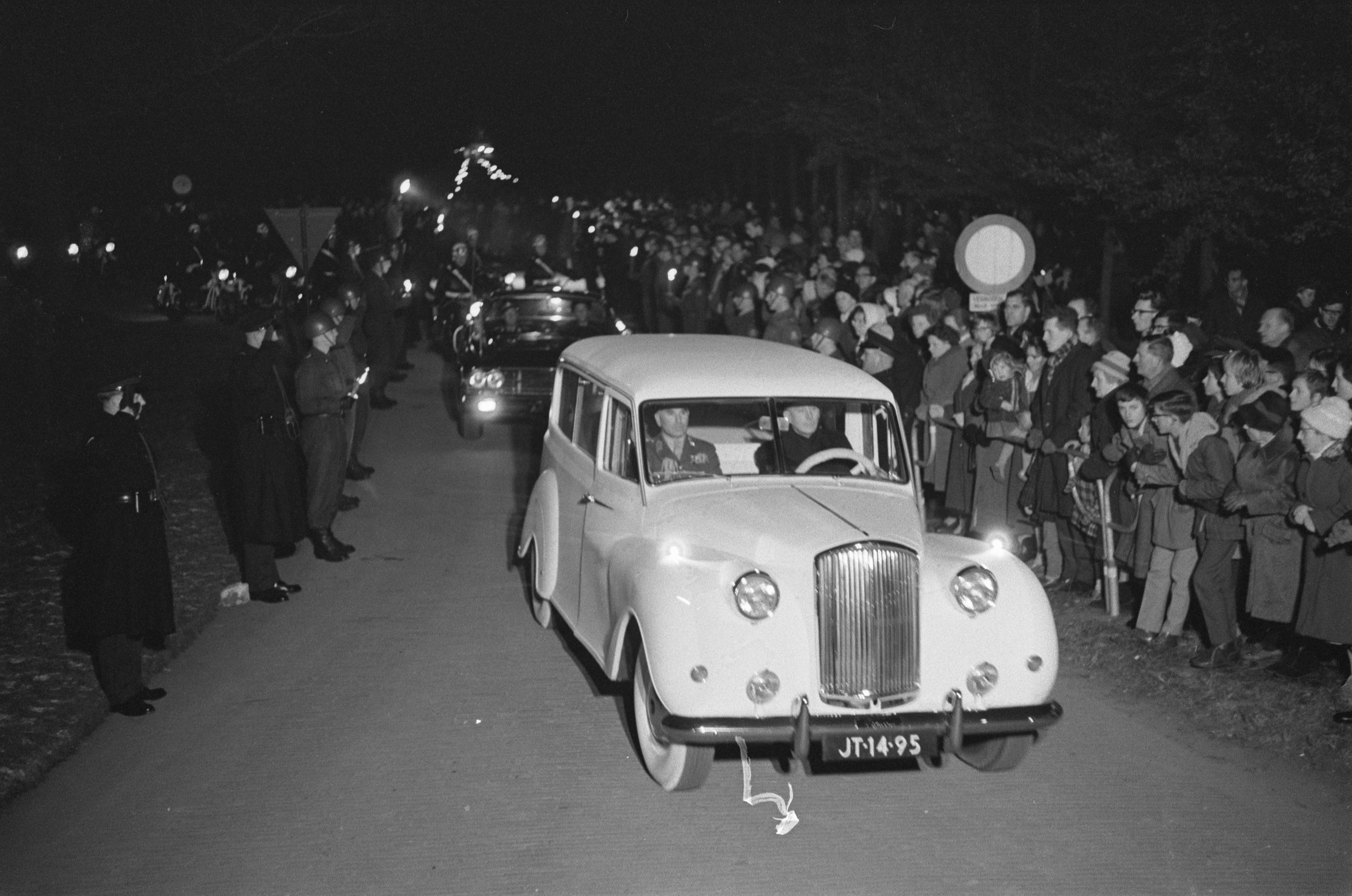
Funeral of Queen Wilhelmina of the Netherlands 1962

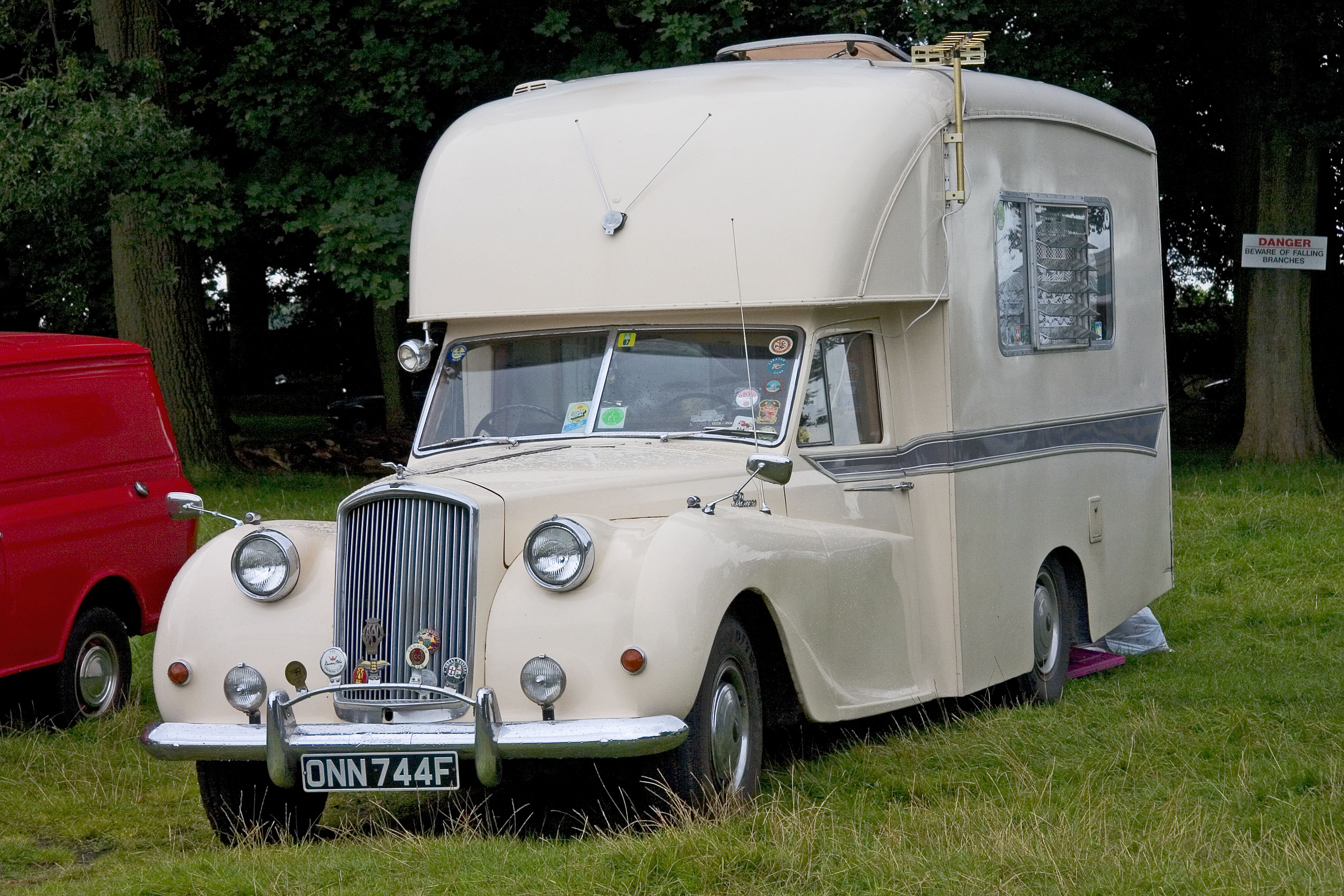
Princess DM4 motorhome conversion

== Vanden Plas Princess 1100/1275/1300 ==
The Vanden Plas Princess 1100 was launched in 1963 as a luxury variant of the BMC ADO16. Production of the Princess 1100 and subsequent 1275 and 1300 models ended in 1974 with 43,741 examples produced.

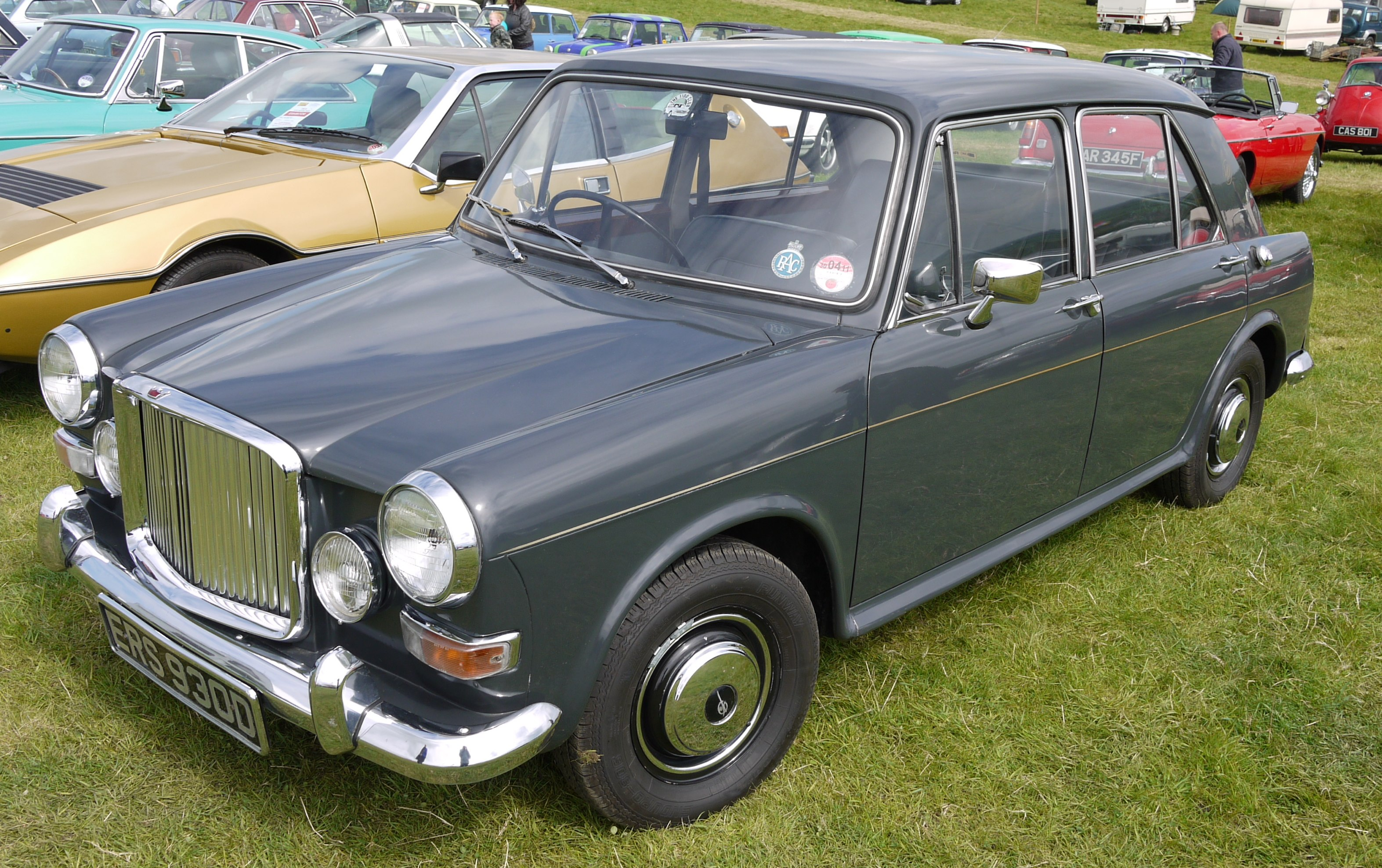
Vanden Plas Princess 1100

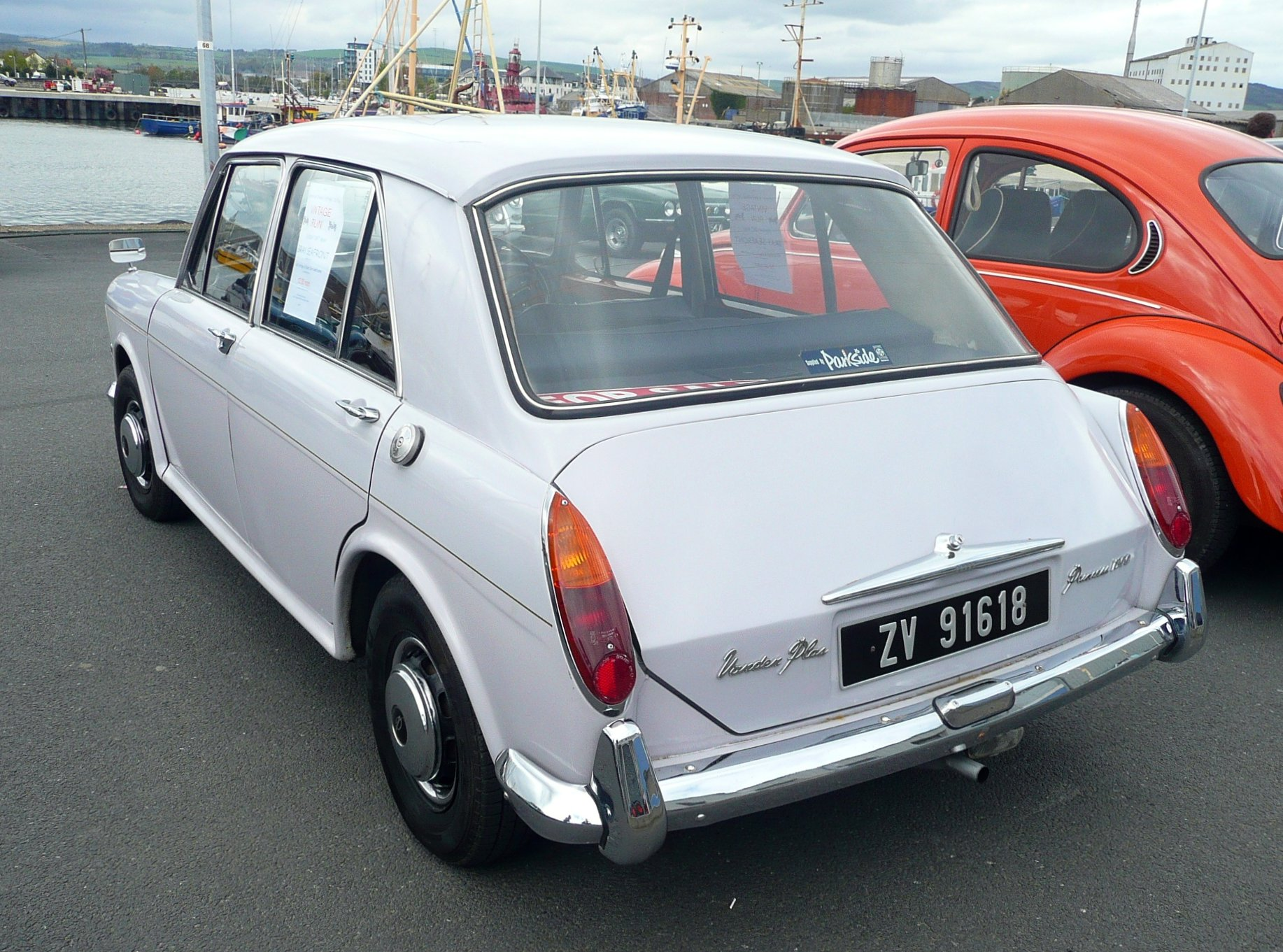
Vanden Plas Princess 1300

== Princess (ADO71) ==
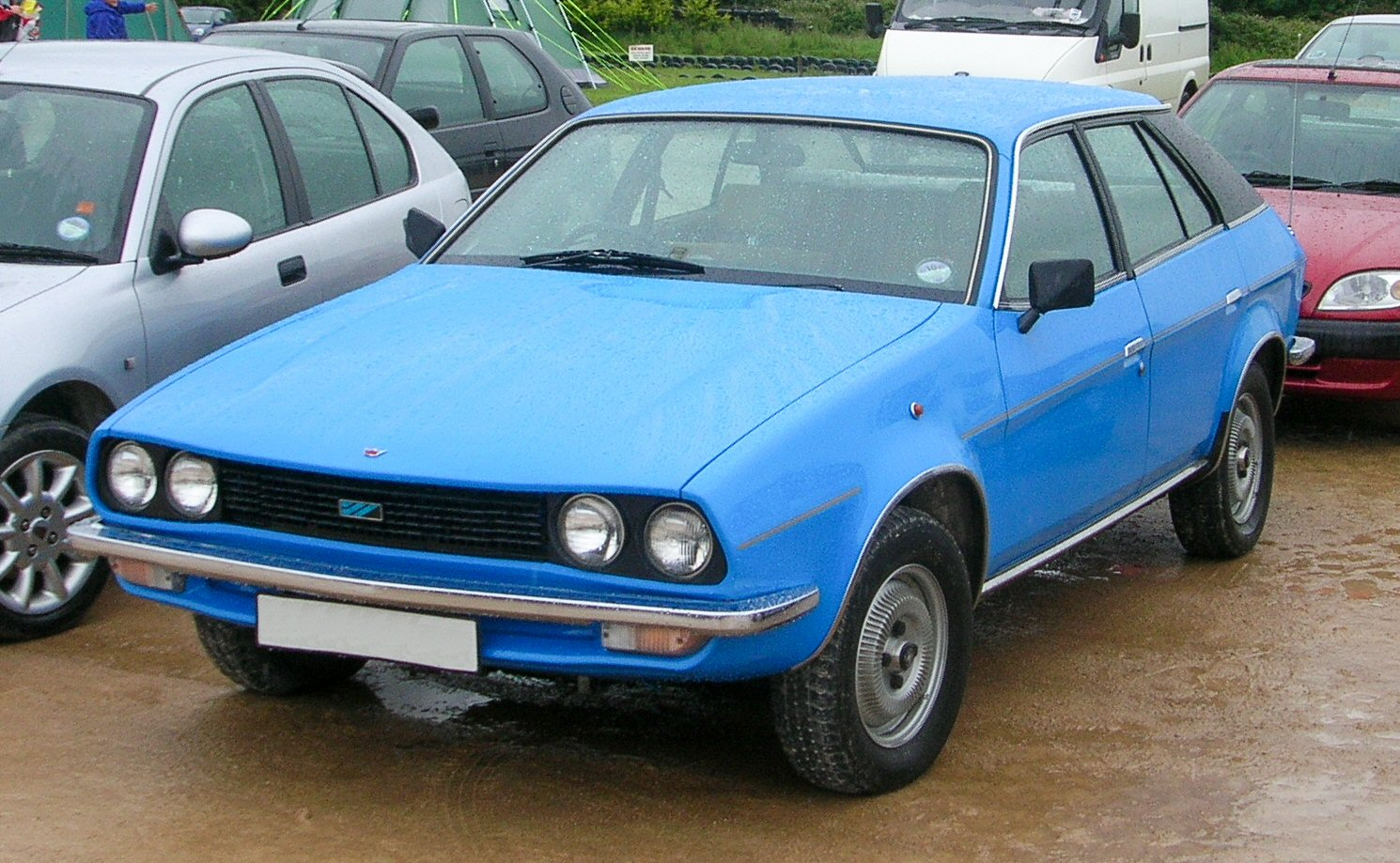
Princess 2 HL of 1979

The final use of the "Princess" name was for the Princess 1800 / 2200 of 1975–78 and the Princess 2 1700 / 2000 / 2200 of 1978–81. This was not badged as an Austin on the home market (although it was badged as such in New Zealand), but was sometimes confused with one because for the first year of its life it was marketed (variously) as the Austin, Morris, and Wolseley 18–22 Series. It was succeeded by the Austin Ambassador in 1982 and thus marked the end of the Princess marque, although the Vanden Plas name continued as the most luxurious trim level in the Rover SD1 range.
