= Daimler DS420 =

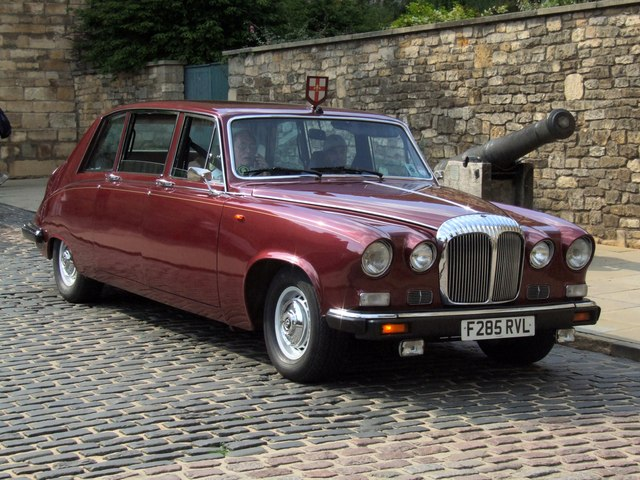
- Lincoln's mayoral transport from 1989 to 1996

Overview
- Manufacturer: The Jaguar Company Limited (Jaguar Cars)
- Also called: Daimler Limousine
- Production: 1968–1992; 4,141 (limousines) & 903 (chassis only)
- Assembly: United Kingdom: Kingsbury, England (1968–1979); United Kingdom: Coventry, England (from 1979)

Body and chassis
- Class: Luxury car
- Body style: Limousine
- Related: Jaguar Mark X

Powertrain
- Engine: 4235 cc Jaguar XK straight-six
- Transmission: 3-speed automatic: • BorgWarner Model 8 • BorgWarner Model 12 • GM Turbo-Hydramatic 400

Dimensions
- Wheelbase: 358 cm (141 in)
- Length: 574 cm (226 inches)
- Width: 197 cm (77.56 inches)
- Height: 161 cm (63.39 inches)
- Kerb weight: 2133 kg (4702 pounds)

Chronology
- Predecessor: Daimler DR450 and Vanden Plas Princess limousines
- Successor: None

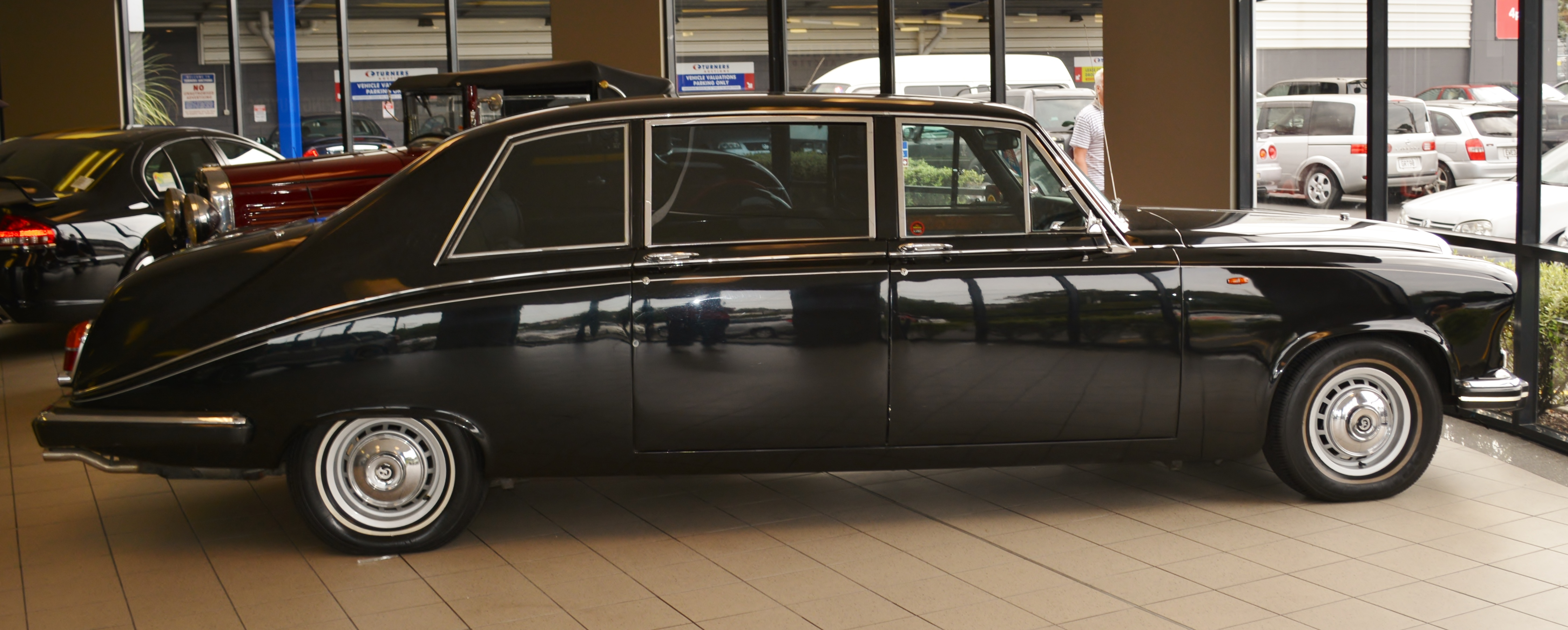
Manufactured 1988

The Daimler DS420, also known as the Daimler Limousine, is a limousine made by the Daimler Company between 1968 and 1992. The car was designed for official use and it was popular with chauffeur services, hoteliers and undertakers. It was used as an official state car in many countries. No other limousine model has been delivered to more reigning monarchs than the DS420, and the car is still used by the royal houses of the United Kingdom, Sweden, Denmark, and Luxembourg.

== Origins ==
The Daimler Company was purchased by Jaguar Cars in 1960, which itself was bought by the British Motor Corporation (BMC) in 1966 and became part of the larger British Leyland conglomerate in 1968. BMC and Jaguar each had their own limousines before merging operations: the Vanden Plas Princess and the Daimler DR450, respectively. Rather than build two competing products, they decided to consolidate limousine production to a single model under the Daimler marque. Most of the engineering of the DS420 would be carried out by Jaguar, the new model to share parts such as the engine, gearbox, and suspension with the Jaguar 420G. Production of the DS420 was announced in June 1968, with the cars being built at the Vanden Plas works in Kingsbury. The short designation DS420 was in accordance with earlier Daimler designations where the first letter stood for Daimler, the second letter was part of an alphabetical sequence (i.e. the predecessor was "DR", thus the successor was "DS"), and "420" referred to the 4.2-litre (260 cu in) displacement of the XK engine.

== Description ==
The DS420 was built on the floorpan of Jaguar's 420G flagship model with the Jaguar wheelbase extended 21 in (533 mm). The front styling was like the contemporary Daimler Sovereign with the traditional Daimler fluted grille and the headlights of the Jaguar 420G. The new limousine also shared the 420G's twin ten-US-gallon (38 L) fuel tanks set in each of the rear wings, each with its own electric SU pump selected by a dashboard-mounted switch.

The driver sat on a fixed full-width bench seat in a relatively upright position with no more allowance for the driver's size or shape than 2.75 inches (7 cm) of telescopic adjustment to the column of the low-set steering wheel. The passengers were seated behind a bulkhead with a sliding window that separated them from the driver's compartment. Three of the six passengers sat facing forward on a bench seat over 6 feet (1.8 m) in width, while the other three sat on occasional folding seats.

In comparison to a Rolls-Royce Phantom VI, the DS420's wheelbase was 4 inches (10 cm) shorter, its body 12 inches (30 cm) shorter, it was approximately 350 kilograms (770 lb) lighter, and its engine had only about two-thirds the displacement of the Rolls-Royce V8. As such, the Daimler was less expensive than a Rolls-Royce, less than half the price of the long-wheelbase Silver Wraith II.

== Production ==
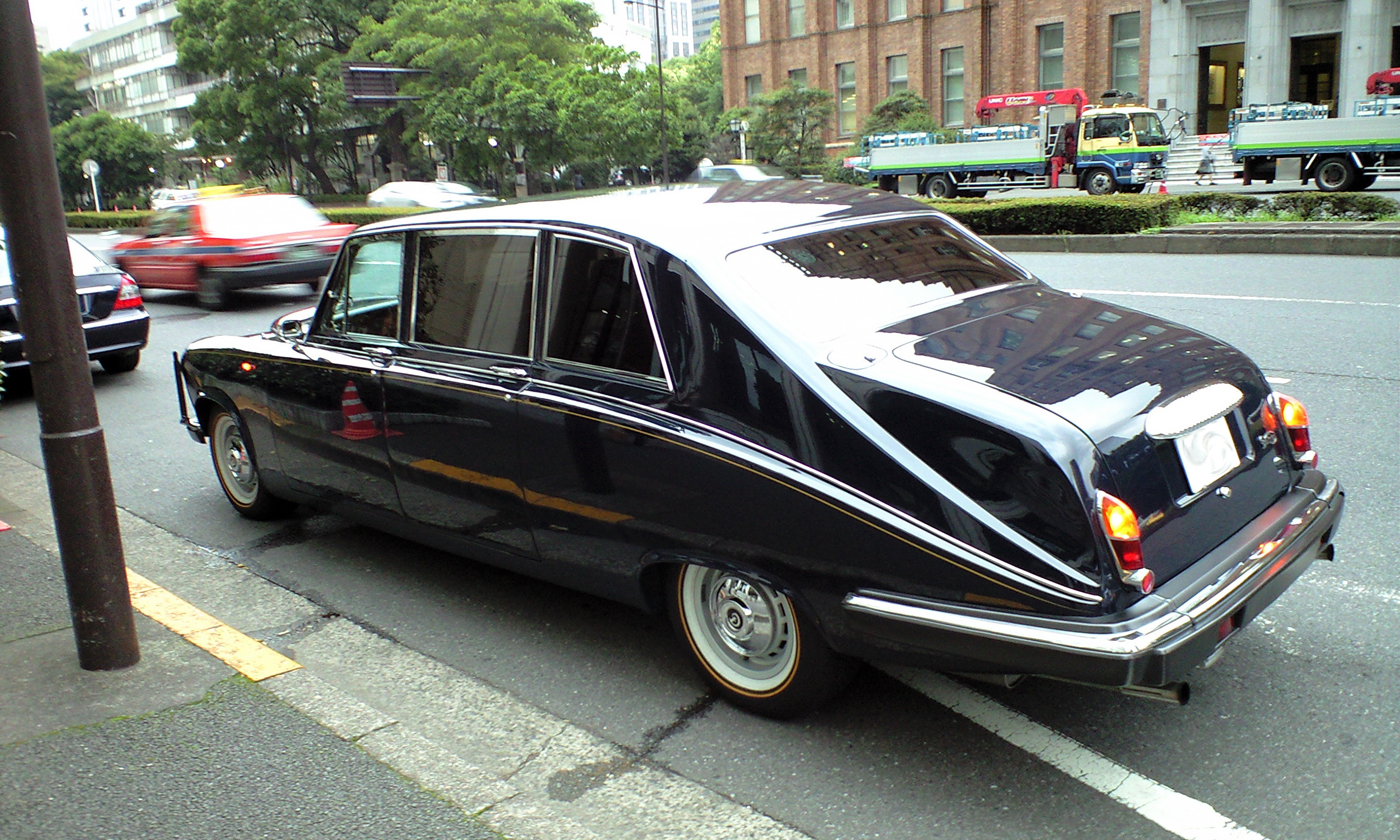
Daimler DS420 (Japan)

Originally, the cars were built at the Vanden Plas works in Kingsbury Lane, London, from body shells made by Park Sheet Metal Company, assembling panels supplied by Motor Panels of Coventry, and by Pressed Steel Fisher. Early limousines bore the "Daimler Vanden Plas" designation on tread plates and workshop manuals. The Kingsbury plant was closed in 1979 and production moved to Jaguar in Coventry, where it continued until 1992. The move to Coventry also brought the second and most extensive facelift in the car's life, when larger bumpers and a revised rear number-plate frame were fitted.

The previous facelift had occurred in 1972 modernizing the window arrangement for the rear passengers. This involved a change from the previous design's division glass design (split between one vertically sliding portion and one fixed pane) to one single window that could slide up and down. It also addressed the corrosion issue of earlier cars (which was related to the division glass), slightly changed the dimensions of the grille, exterior badge placement, and reduced the amount of woodwork in the interior. The third and final facelift came in 1987, with the change to new, plastic-coated bumpers and minor changes to the interior. This last model, known as the "Mk IV", was produced until 1992, when Jaguar/Daimler ceased production of their last coach-built limousine. The factory also supplied part-bodies to external coach-builders to allow them to construct hearses.

Delivered vehicles varied from very basic models, with manually operated windows, to a model—reportedly produced in 1984 for the use of Jaguar boss John Egan—that was outfitted as a mobile boardroom, complete with a TV, computer, printer, and cocktail cabinet. The DS420 had an extensive list of additional options. Private owners tended to fully option their cars, while the service industry, including the funeral trade and limousine companies, tended to want few options. Until the early 1980s, after their purchase by Hertz, Daimler Hire was one of the largest clients. Daimler Hire cars were offered as limousine transportation, as well as for state and official use. Most Daimler Hire cars were well equipped with options, including electric division window, air conditioning, matching leather interiors, and the bonnet flag mount for ceremonial use.

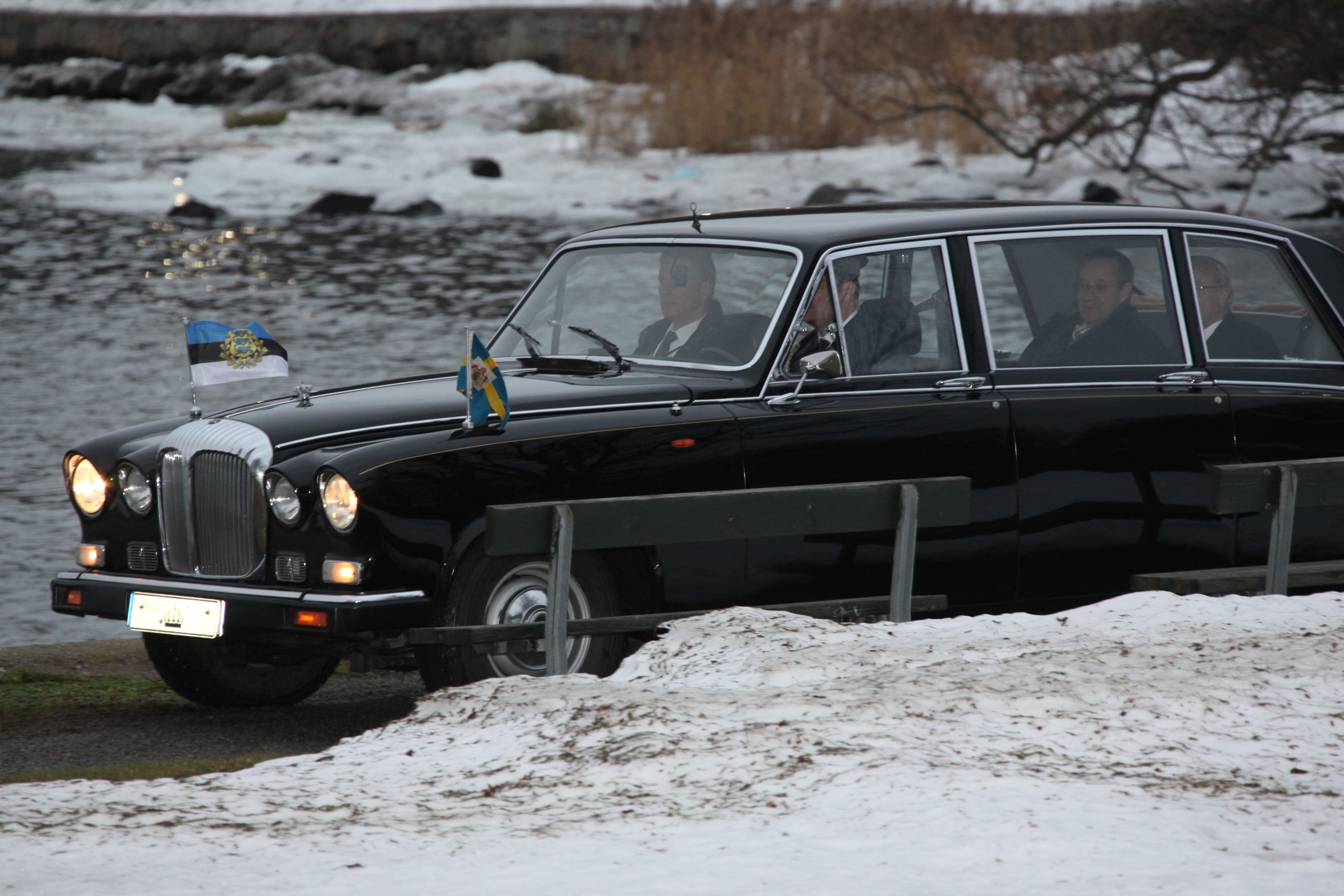
Swedish state car at a state visit from Estonia in Sweden January 2011

The DS420 had a fascia very similar to contemporary Mark X and 420G Jaguars retaining the old-fashioned steering column and pencil-thin steering wheel. Two cars were built in landaulette bodywork by the factory. Apparently neither have survived.

By 1992, the DS420 was the only model in the Jaguar range still using the XK engine, along with other parts of the drive train and suspension; and, although the car still appealed to its traditional customers, production was no longer economical. The last DS420, registered L420 YAC, was built in Browns Lane towards the end of 1992 and is the last production car built to have an XK engine installed. This is in the care of the Jaguar Daimler Heritage Trust. No direct replacement was produced by Jaguar, although coach builders have adapted the Daimler version of the XJ6.

== Customers ==
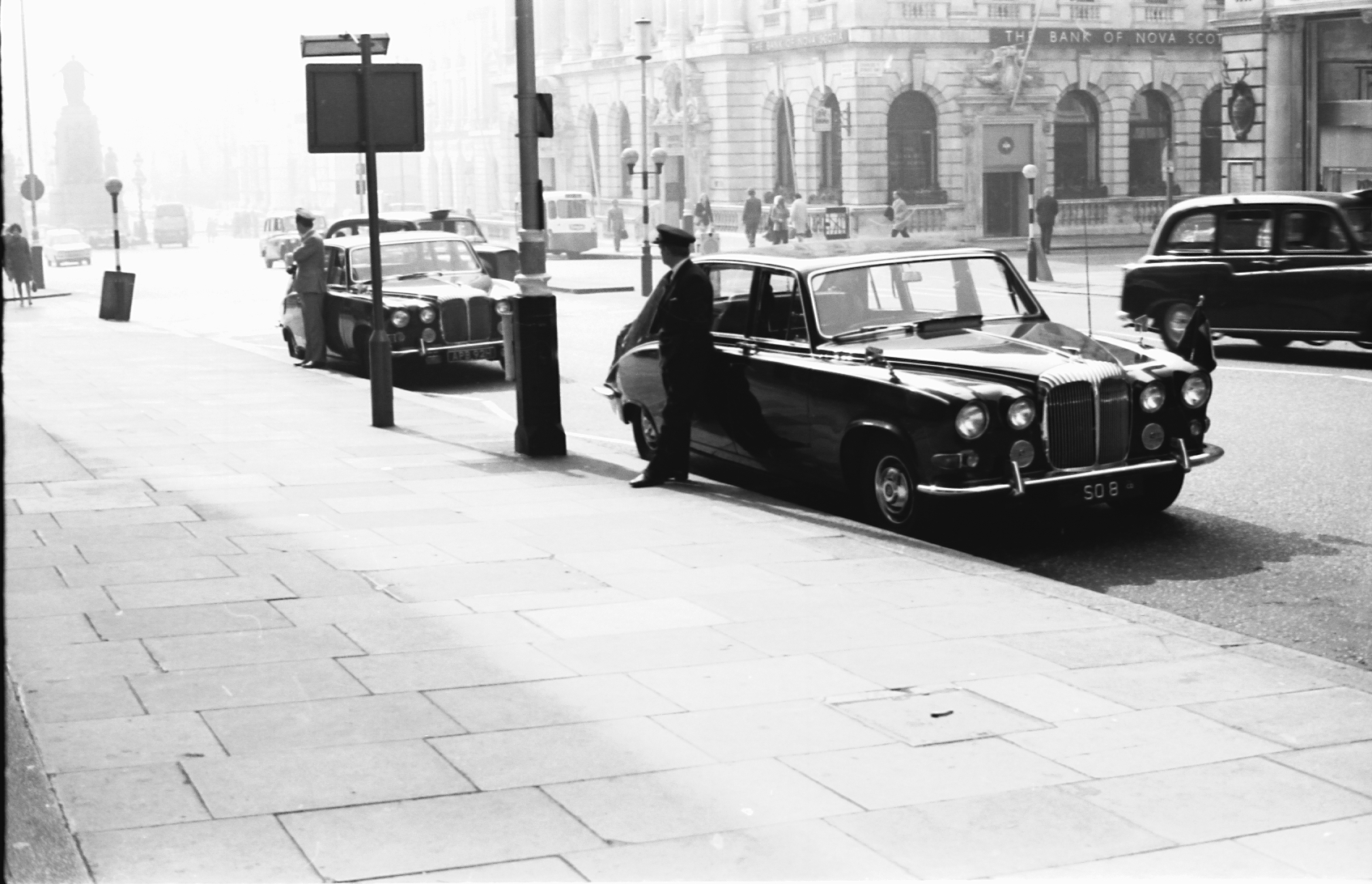
Westminster 1974, showing pre-facelift features

The Daimler DS420 is widely used among the funeral trade, serving as both the executive car for mourning relatives and the hearse, after customization, for the deceased. The most prominent funeral with a Daimler Limousine and hearse was that of Diana, the Princess of Wales in 1997. Diana's coffin was transported in a 1985 Daimler hearse from RAF Northolt to St. James Palace for a lying in state. Her two sisters followed in a 1992 Daimler Limousine belonging to Elizabeth II.

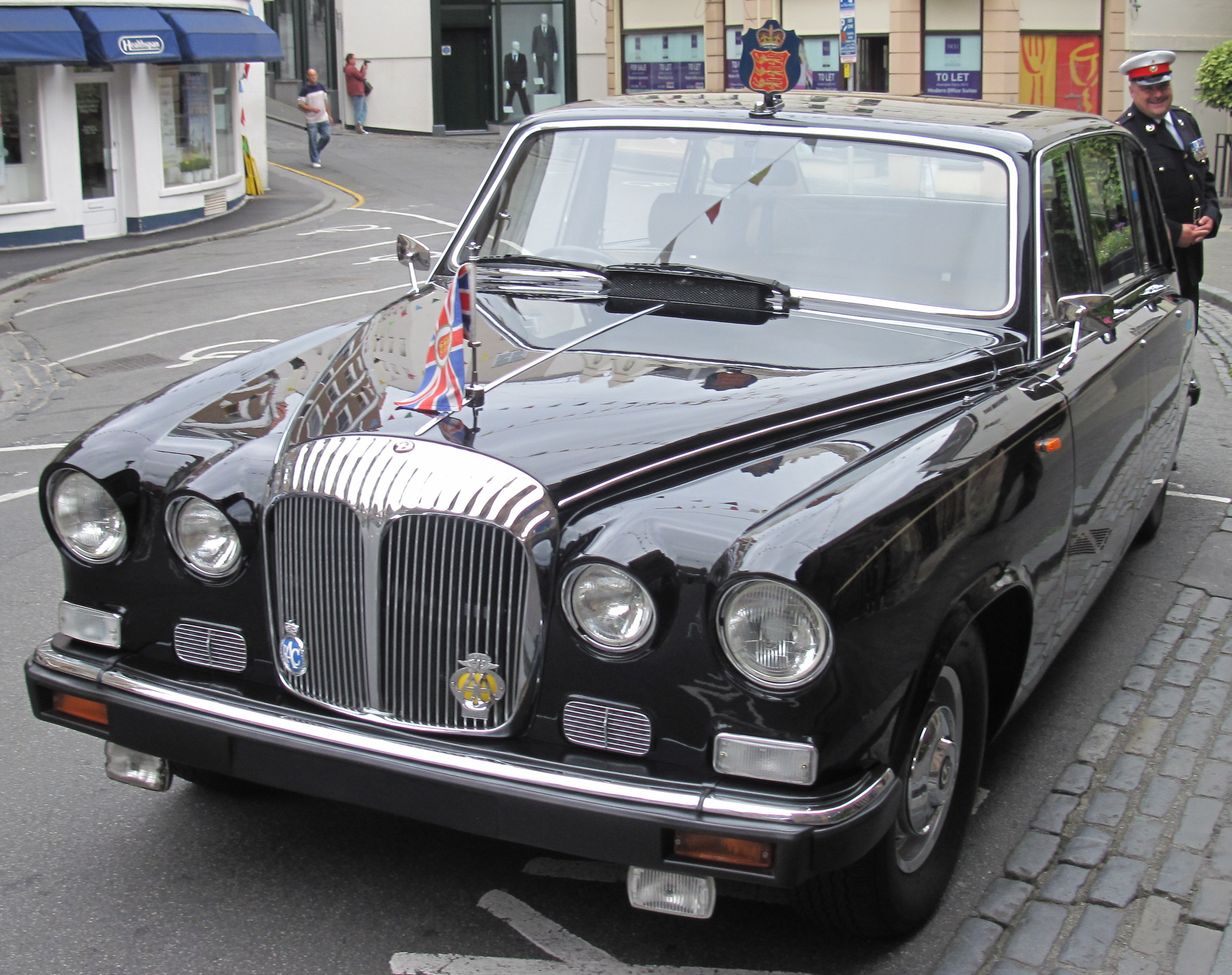
Lieutenant Governor of Guernsey limousine

The limousines have also been used to transport representatives of the Monarch worldwide, as well as diplomatic missions in London, including governors of Hong Kong, the High Commissioner of New Zealand, the Governor of Tasmania, and the Governor of Guernsey. A Daimler Limousine still serves the Lieutenant Governor of Jersey. Diplomatic missions that have used the DS420 include Jordan, Oman, Portugal, and Spain. The DS420 was also the choice of other governments who were looking for an appropriate car to transport dignitaries during state visits or for use by their own officials on formal occasions, such governments including those of Australia and New Zealand.

The vehicles were also used by hotels that provided them to their guests for transportation. The Regent Hotel in Hong Kong (today known as the InterContinental Hong Kong) had, over the years, no less than 22 in service for its guests.

== Royal tradition ==
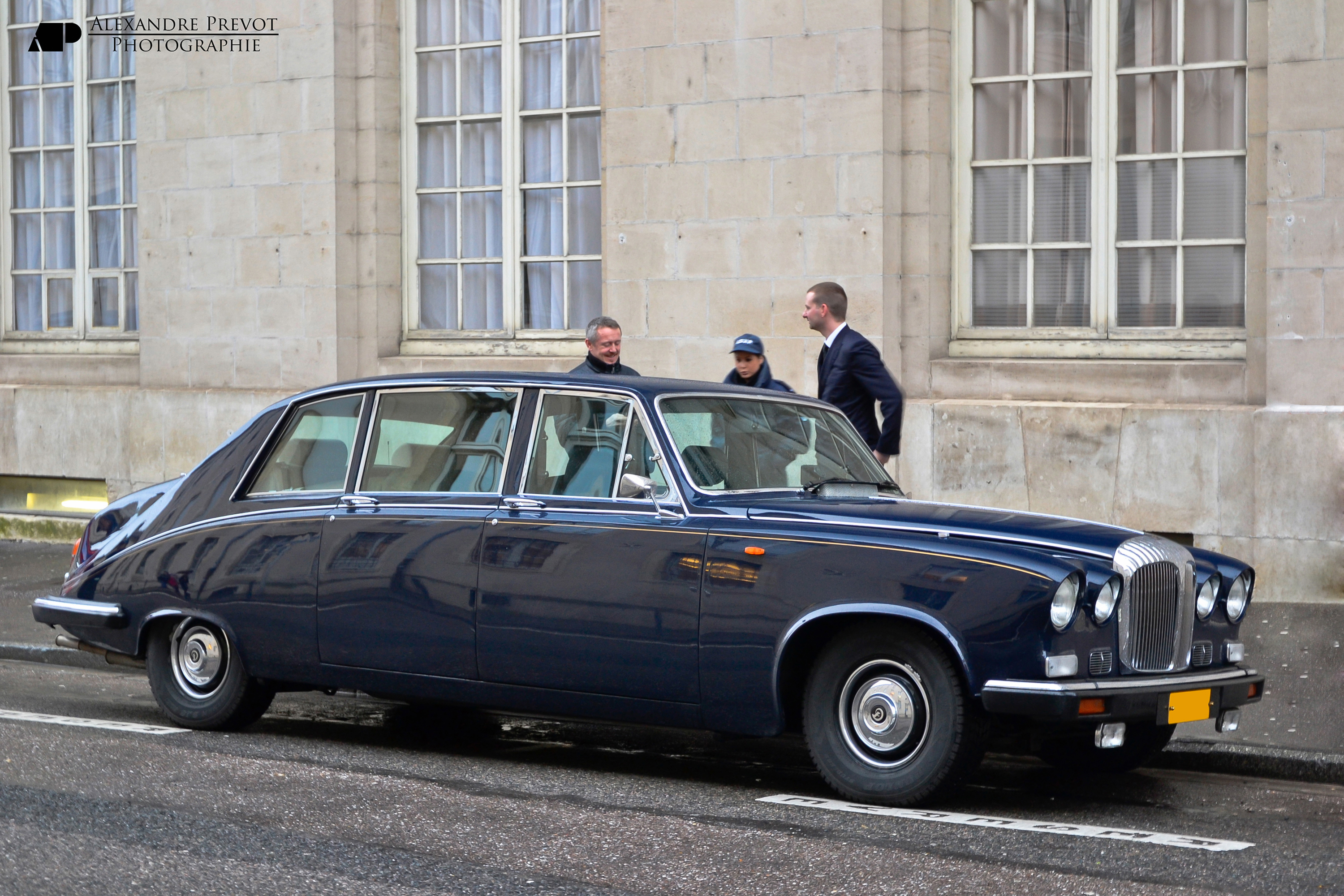
State car of Luxembourg at a royal family wedding in Nancy on 28 December 2018

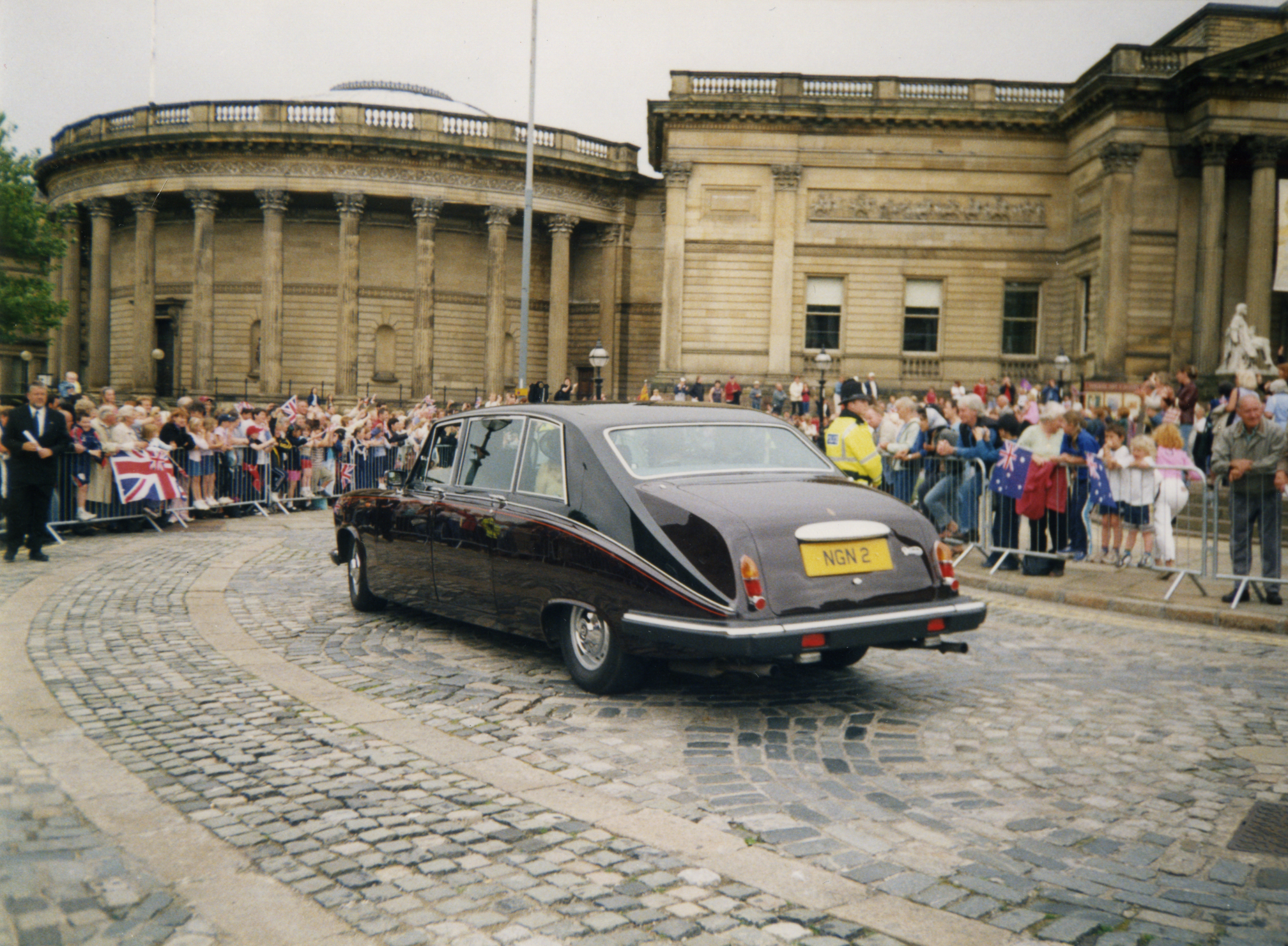
Royal visit to Liverpool c. 1990s - one of five Limousines delivered to Queen Elizabeth II

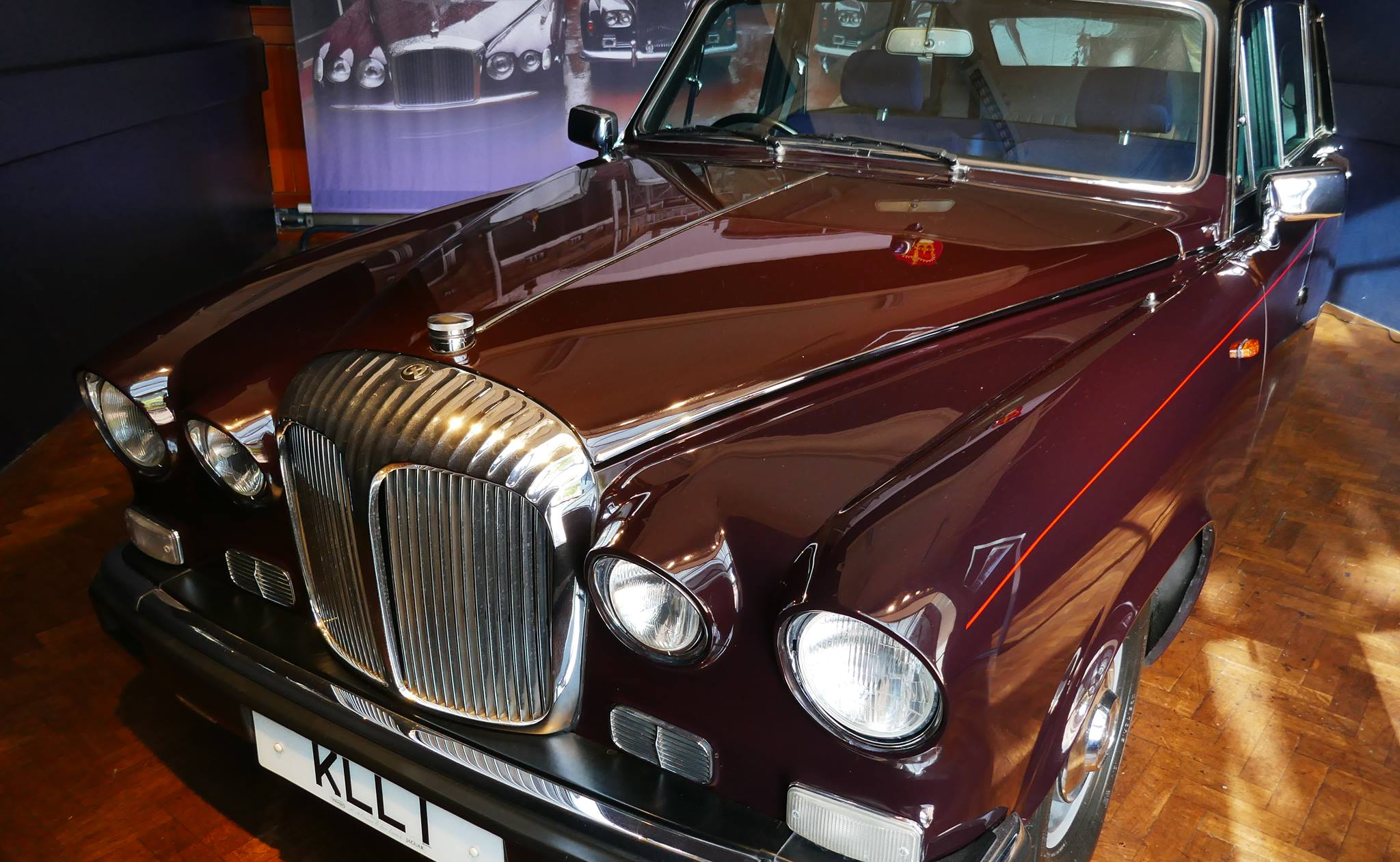
A 1992 Daimler DS420 semi-state limousine garaged at the Royal Mews, Buckingham Palace, London.

Daimler has delivered automobiles to all five monarchs of the United Kingdom since 1901. Prince Philip opened the door to Rolls-Royce with an order for a private car, a Rolls-Royce Phantom IV, which was delivered in 1950 and became part of the official fleet in 1952 when Princess Elizabeth became Queen. Daimler was challenged by the next generation of Rolls–Royce cars, whose Phantom V was more successful, with orders from five reigning monarchs—Queen Elizabeth II of the United Kingdom, King Hussein of Jordan, Emperor Hirohito of Japan, Hakim Isa ibn Salman Al Khalifa of Bahrain and Emir Sabbah III of Kuwait—while the Daimler DR450 was delivered to King Bhumibol Adulyadej of Thailand and King Hussein of Jordan. The Daimler Straight Eight (DE36) was a favourite among reigning monarchs, including King Bhumibol Adulyadej of Thailand, King Mohammed Zahir of Afghanistan, Emperor Haile Selassie of Ethiopia, Queen Wilhelmina of the Netherlands and Prince Rainier of Monaco.

William Lyons launched the Daimler DS420 in the same year as the Rolls-Royce Phantom VI. The new Daimler was to re-establish Daimler supremacy with royal courts, starting with King Frederik IX of Denmark, who would experience the very first Daimler Limousine, a pre-production demonstrator on his visit to London in April 1968 and who later ordered a black production model, delivered in March 1970. After the death of King Frederik IX, this car served his successor Queen Margrethe II, the dowager Queen Ingrid, and Crown Prince Frederik at his 2004 wedding to Crown Princess Mary. In 2008, the Daimler would again serve in the same role at the wedding of Prince Joachim and Princess Marie, whom the Limousine then served subsequently. This first DS420 Limousine delivered to a monarch is still with the Queen's fleet and thus has served the Danish court for almost half a century. Following the death of her father King Frederik IX in 1972, both his daughter and successor, Queen Margrethe II of Denmark and Dowager Queen Ingrid wanted the use of the Daimler; and so another DS420 was ordered, which was delivered in 1974. It was the same as the first except for a small change in the layout of the rear side windows. Queen Ingrid opted for the newer car and used it both privately and for official duties.

Prince Rainier III of Monaco also took delivery of a DS420 in 1970. His DS420 had exterior two-tone paint of "silk" (a mixture of gold, silver, and pale green) over black, the same as his previous car, a Rolls-Royce. The Daimler carried a blue bullet-lamp on the roof and served the prince as state car until his death in 2005. The limousine is on display in Monaco's Automobile Museum, which was founded by the Prince in Monte Carlo.

Another owner of the DS420 was Queen Elizabeth the Queen Mother, who visited the Vanden Plas factory to supervise customizing to her specifications. Between 1970 and her death in 2002, no less than five separate DS420s served her (delivered in 1970, 1978, 1983, 1986, and 1992). They were all painted in the royal colours of "Black over Royal Claret", had a blue bullet-lamp on the roof, and carried the Registration "NLT 1" or, later, "NLT2". It was the wish of the Queen Mother that after her death her final DS420 should be given to the Jaguar Daimler Heritage Trust (JDHT), which today maintains the limousine (with new registration K123 EYL) at the museum at Gaydon, or takes it to rallies.

King Hussein of Jordan ordered a Daimler Limousine in 1970. It was painted in the colour "Sand" and served various duties, including bringing King Abdullah II to school when he was young. The Limousine today is on display at the Royal Automobile Museum at Amman.

Grand Duke Jean of Luxembourg ordered a Daimler DS420 in 1970, as his new state car, taking delivery in 1971. The Limousine was painted "Westminster Blue" and served him until 1988, when he replaced it with a new DS420 in the same colour. As of 2025, it was still sometimes used by his successor, Grand Duke Henri, most notably during state visits.

In January 1972, Sultan Qaboos of Oman took delivery two cars of identical configuration, in black paint and with black leather in the front compartment and fawn West-of-England cloth in the rear compartment.

In 1977, King Yahya Petra of Malaysia took delivery of a Daimler Limousine in the second half of 1977.

He was followed by Sultan Hassanal Bolkiah of Brunei who had his 1981 Limousine based and registered in England where he has several retreats.

In 1984, there were eight orders by reigning monarchs, the record of the Straight Eight was already broken. One important customer was still without a DS420, until Queen Elizabeth II placed her first order for a Daimler Limousine. Her DS420 was to serve mostly as transport for her son Prince Charles and his spouse. As with the models supplied to the Queen Mother, it was painted black over royal claret and carried a blue bullet lamp.

By 1986, the time was ripe for the third order from the Danish court to replace one of the two limousines in frequent use, but it was to replace the newer, not the older car—most likely for sentimental reasons, allowing dowager Queen Ingrid to continue with the Daimler her husband King Frederik IX had ordered. Queen Margrethe II had the new DS420 painted "Westminster Blue".

1987 saw the 35-year anniversary of the reign of Queen Elizabeth II and a welcome occasion for the rejuvenation of her fleet of cars. The two Vanden Plas Princess Limousines were discontinued, as was the Rolls-Royce Phantom IV Landaulet. Both manufacturers were allowed to deliver a new model to the Royal Mews—Rolls-Royce delivered a Phantom VI with standard limousine body, and Daimler a DS420 Limousine with the facelift introduced the same year. The 1987 Daimler Limousine (chassis nr. 200970) served Prince Charles, Diana, Princess of Wales and their sons Prince William and Prince Harry, for whom the occasional seats seemed tailor-made. The most frequent user was Sarah Ferguson, the Duchess of York, during official engagements. The Queen used it for less formal occasions that did not necessitate the use of a state car. Who was using the Daimler Limousine could be determined by the flag shield carried on the roof behind the blue bullet lamp: the Queen would mount her personal flag shield, such as during her visit to Snettisham in 1992. Other members of the royal family could display their personal flag shields as well but regularly used the flag shield with the vice-regal crown, which is also mounted when other dignitaries are being transported, such as the private secretaries, the ladies-in-waiting, the mistress of the robes, or the spouses of foreign heads of state, accompanied by Prince Philip, following the state car. The 1987 Daimler Limousine was the first example of the latest generation to be supplied to a royal court. The revised layout was to generate further orders from reigning monarchs.

In 1950, at the Swedish court, a Daimler 4-litre Hooper Limousine was elected to serve as a state car. By 1987, a modern alternative was sought after and found in the DS420 Limousine. The black Daimler (chassis nr. 201045) was finished in October 1987 and subsequently handed over to King Carl XVI Gustaf of Sweden. It is still in service, but for lesser official engagements the Swedish King makes use of modern saloons.

In Luxembourg, as well, the revised design prompted a new order. In September 1988, Grand Duke Jean replaced his 1971 Daimler Limousine with another in "Westminster Blue" (chassis nr. 201168).

By this time, Queen Elizabeth II had already been supplied her third DS420 Limousine (chassis nr. 201127), which was delivered in August 1988, to replace the 1984 model. Apart from a small detail in the interior, it had an identical configuration as the 1987 model.

By 1992, this chapter could have ended, because production of the DS420 Limousine was discontinued. Of the four final examples produced, one went to the Jaguar Daimler Heritage Trust, another to the Queen Mother (chassis nr. 201629) and an identically equipped pair to Queen Elizabeth II. (chassis nrs. 201628 and 201630). The Daimler Limousine had survived its rival Rolls-Royce Phantom VI by one year. Both manufacturers had to adhere to new requirements such as crash-tests and emission-regulations. The XK-engine from the 1950s and the chassis from the 1960s were the limiting factors, but not a lack of desire on the part of royalty. Both the two 1992 models and the 1988 model served Queen Elizabeth as semi-state cars and were used at the weddings of Prince Edward, Prince William, Prince Harry, and Princess Eugenie.

Queen Margrethe II of Denmark would have liked one DS420 as well, but where to get one after end of production, when monarchs are not customers on the used-car market. The Danish Queen was lucky to find a pristine example, with almost no mileage on the odometer, that was kept in reserve by a Swedish importer since 1987. It was also in "Westminster Blue", such as was the 1986 model of the Queen. Likely intended as a supplement for the Swedish King, this 1987 Daimler Limousine (chassis nr. 201065) was delivered to the Danish Queen in 1994. This newest model in her fleet was not to become number 1 immediately. The cars of the Danish court have license plates with a crown and a number. The Daimlers had Crown 1, Crown 2, and Crown 5, but in changeable arrangements. At the wedding of Crown Prince Frederik in 2004, the oldest Daimler still carried Crown 1 while the youngest from 1987 had to settle for Crown 5. At a later date they changed registrations, and the 1987 Limousine is now the car for the daily duties of the Queen, despite its age. The Daimler even sometimes replaces the Rolls-Royce Silver Wraith as the state car. The 1986 model with Registration Crown 2 that had served the Crown Prince and his wife on several occasions since 2004 is since 2011 exclusively used by them.

A final change worth mentioning in this context took place in Luxembourg in 2000 when Grand Duke Jean abdicated and his son became Grand Duke Henri of Luxembourg. The Daimler Limousine remained as the state car after the change, and is in service today. It is definitely the Daimler with the greatest variety of registrations. When hosting state visits or at the parade on National Day it carries a plate that simply displays a crown symbol. In "everyday" duty with the Grand Duke, the plate displays a simple "1". At the wedding of the Hereditary Grand Duke Guillaume to Stephanie de Lannoy in October 2012, the plate displayed an orange and a blue stripe, the colors of the House of Weilburg-Nassau. At the wedding of the nephew of the Grand Duke, who belongs to the House of Habsburg, in Nancy later that year, the corresponding colors of black and yellow were displayed. When the Daimler Limousine is driven outside Luxembourg it carries a diplomatic plate.

The Daimler DS420 can claim a special royal record. The rear compartment allows up to six passengers, the occasional seats favouring children. There is no other car that had the honour to carry six members of a reigning royal family at the same time except the Daimler Limousine. Both sons of Queen Margrethe II of Denmark have four children and they can be seen travelling together with their parents in the rear of the Daimlers. On the other hand, royals sometimes can be found in the drivers compartment of the DS420, such as Prince William in August 1999 or Princess Anne leaving Easter Service at Windsor Chapel in 2016.

With orders from no less than ten reigning monarchs, the Daimler DS420 bested not only the Rolls-Royce Phantom VI, which only drew orders from the King of Thailand and the Sultan of Brunei, but all other models produced in automobile history in terms of gubernatorial orders. This highlights this model's significance and importance as a luxury automobile; it is still in use by the state offices of the United Kingdom, Denmark, Sweden, and Luxembourg, despite its production having ended and the discontinuation of the Daimler marque.
