= Mann & Overton =

Mann & Overton Limited owned and operated a motor vehicle dealers business previously known as Mann & Overton's and established 14 May 1901 which came to specialise in the supply and financing of London taxicabs, first Unic then Austin Taxicabs, eventually holding the concession for the Austin taxicab chassis for the whole of the Metropolitan Police Area of London.

Their base was at 177, Battersea Bridge Road, London, SW11 and their distribution area included the provinces. A major part of their operation was funding cars for drivers carried out from 1907 by Mann & Overton Finance Limited (Note: Company #00095510 inc. 1 November 1907) ultimately M&O's major asset, bought by the Lloyds Bowmaker finance group in 1977.

Their non-finance vehicle retail and service operations were bought in 1984 and added to the group owning Carbodies, later known as London Taxis International, which since 2013 is in liquidation following unsustainable warranty claims.

The most popular London taxicabs continue to be built to the essential Mann & Overton design and provided by their firm's successors.

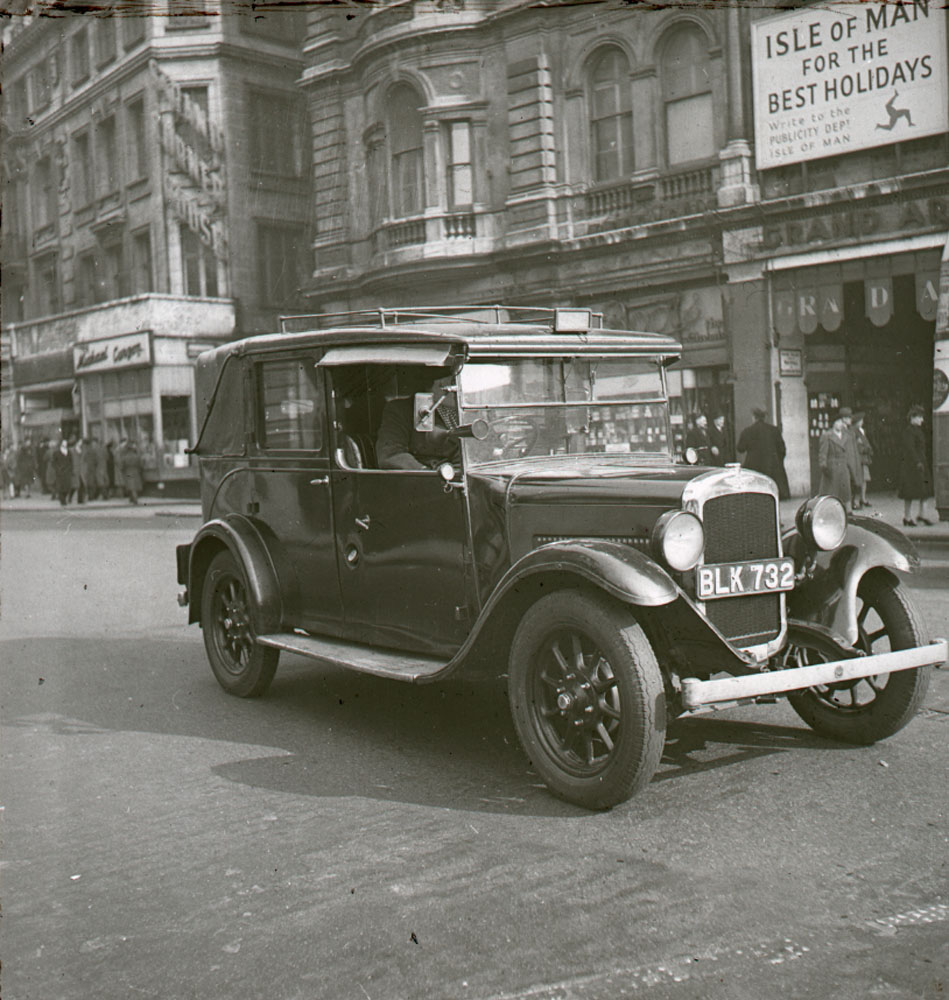
1946

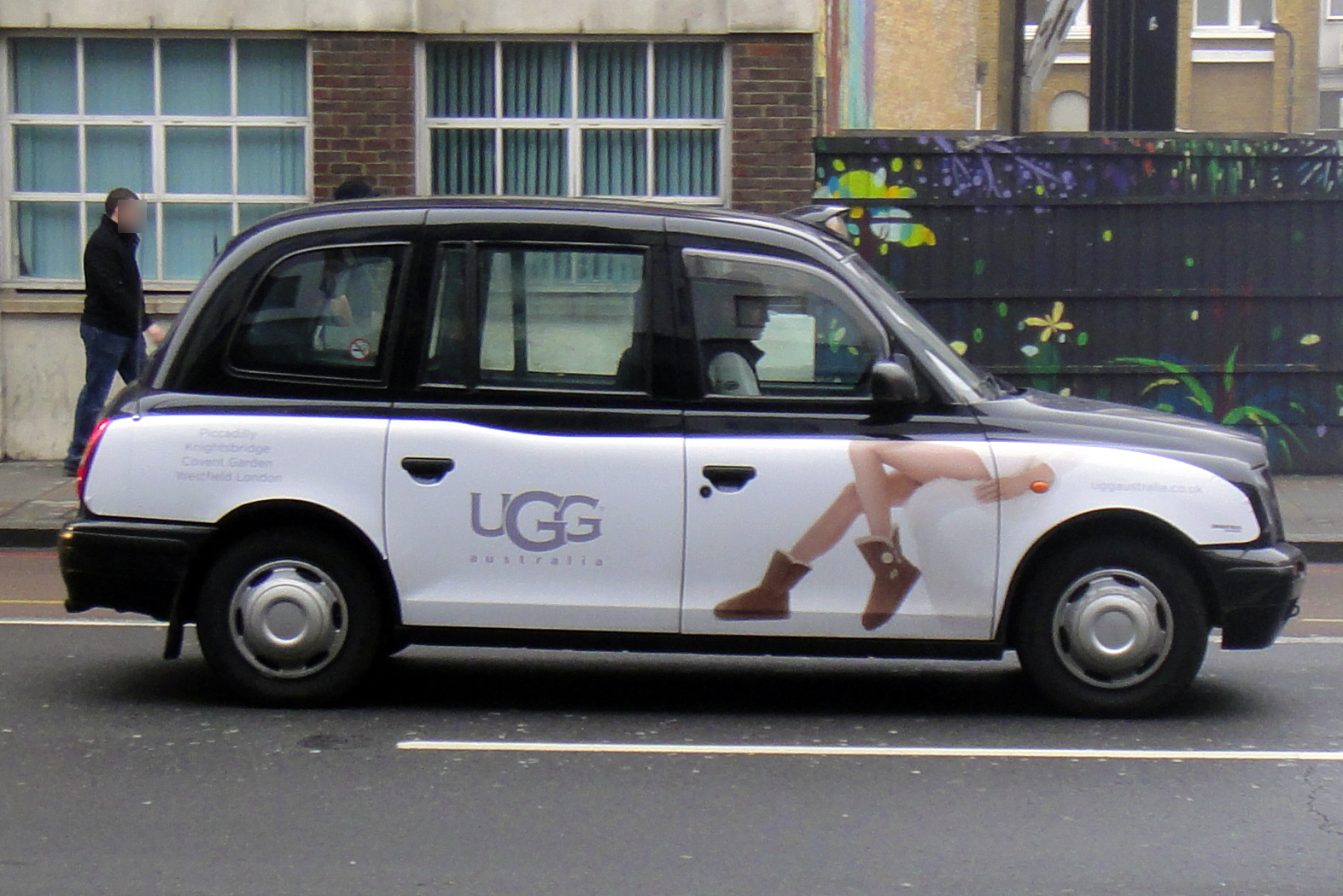
2013 direct descendant

== Founders ==
Directors included: John Thomas Overton, William Overton and Robert Clifton Hills Overton.

== Importers and dealers ==
Mann & Overton's were very active motorcar importers and dealers from their beginning, participating in all significant motor shows in England and Ireland and providing entries in major car trials.

The provision of hire purchase terms to owner-drivers and taxicab investors was an important part of the business— and the reason the business was bought by a banking group in 1977.

== Unic taxicab ==
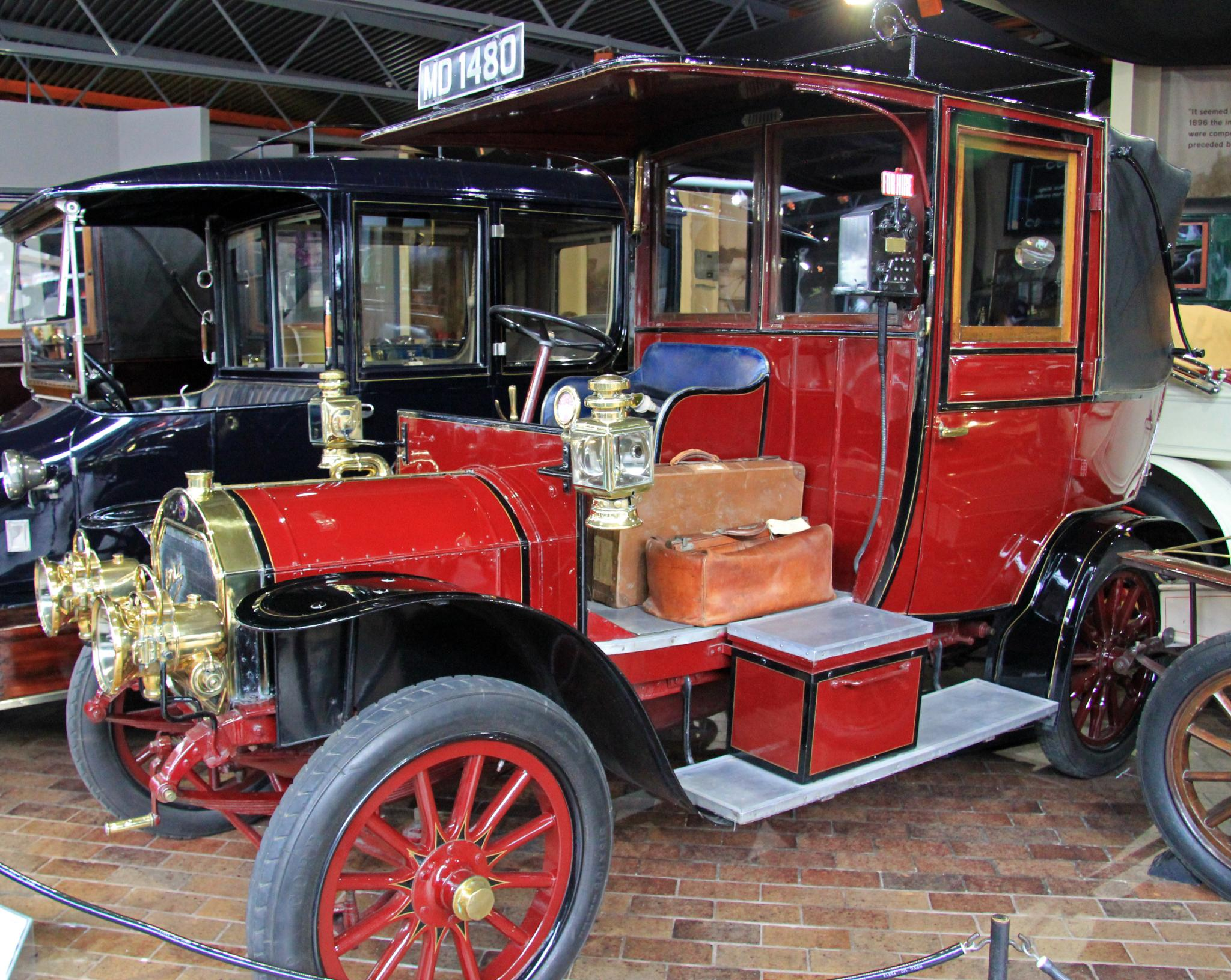
Unic 1906

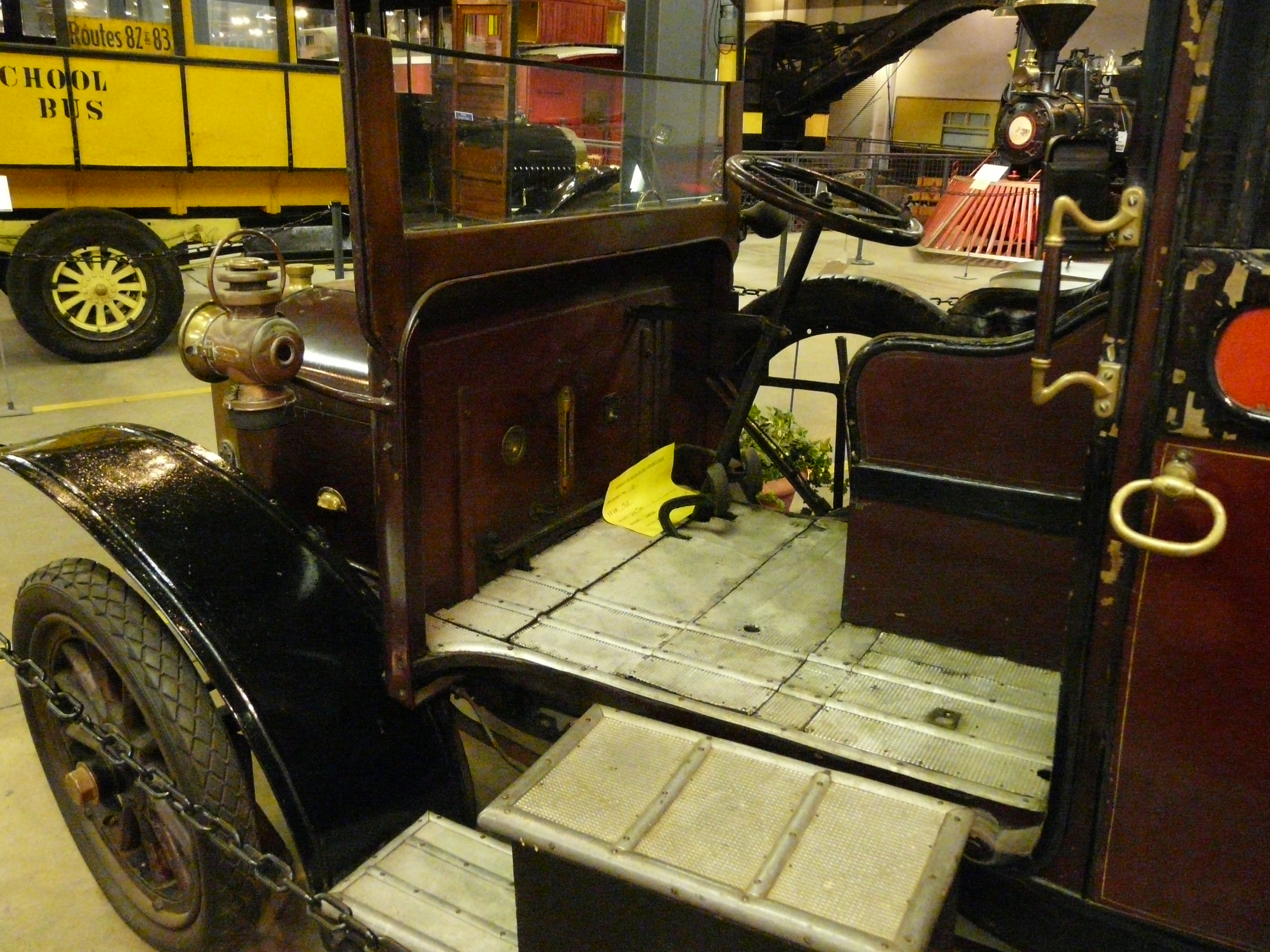
Unic 1909

One of London's original brands of taxicab it was supplied by Mann & Overton Limited who were concessionaires and British distributors of Unic cabs on behalf of the principals in Paris, France. The appearance of these sturdy vehicles changed very little in two decades. In 1924 Mann & Overton supplied nearly 80% of the new cabs licensed in London.

=== The McKenna Duties ===
In 1915 a new tax had been introduced of 33.33% on luxury imports to help fund the war. Relaxed when peace returned these duties were reintroduced in July 1925 and with effect from 1 May 1926 McKenna duties were for the first time imposed on commercial vehicles to protect UK manufacturers from imports. Finally Unic Motors (1928) Limited was established in Cricklewood in North London to assemble French made components to try to reduce the incidence of import duty but the locally assembled taxicabs remained expensive and proved less reliable than the model they replaced.

== Scotland Yard ==
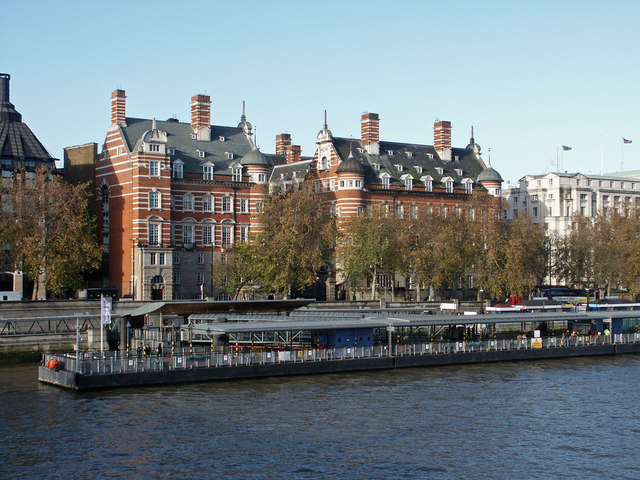
Old headquarters, Metropolitan Police New Scotland Yard 1888-1967

The Public Carriage Office—then under the Metropolitan Police at Scotland Yard but now part of Transport for London (as Taxis and Private Hire)—regulates the design of London's taxicabs. The reason for the lofty appearance was a police regulation stating there must be adequate room for a gentleman wearing a top hat but no-one stipulated what length a gentleman must be from topper to bottom.

Responding to pressure from the London public as well as the industry, in 1927 various design requirements were relaxed. The changes took effect in 1928. Minimum ground clearance went from 10 to 7 inches, four-wheel braking was permitted, the petrol tank no longer need be under the driver's seat and the turning circle was relaxed.

== Austin ==
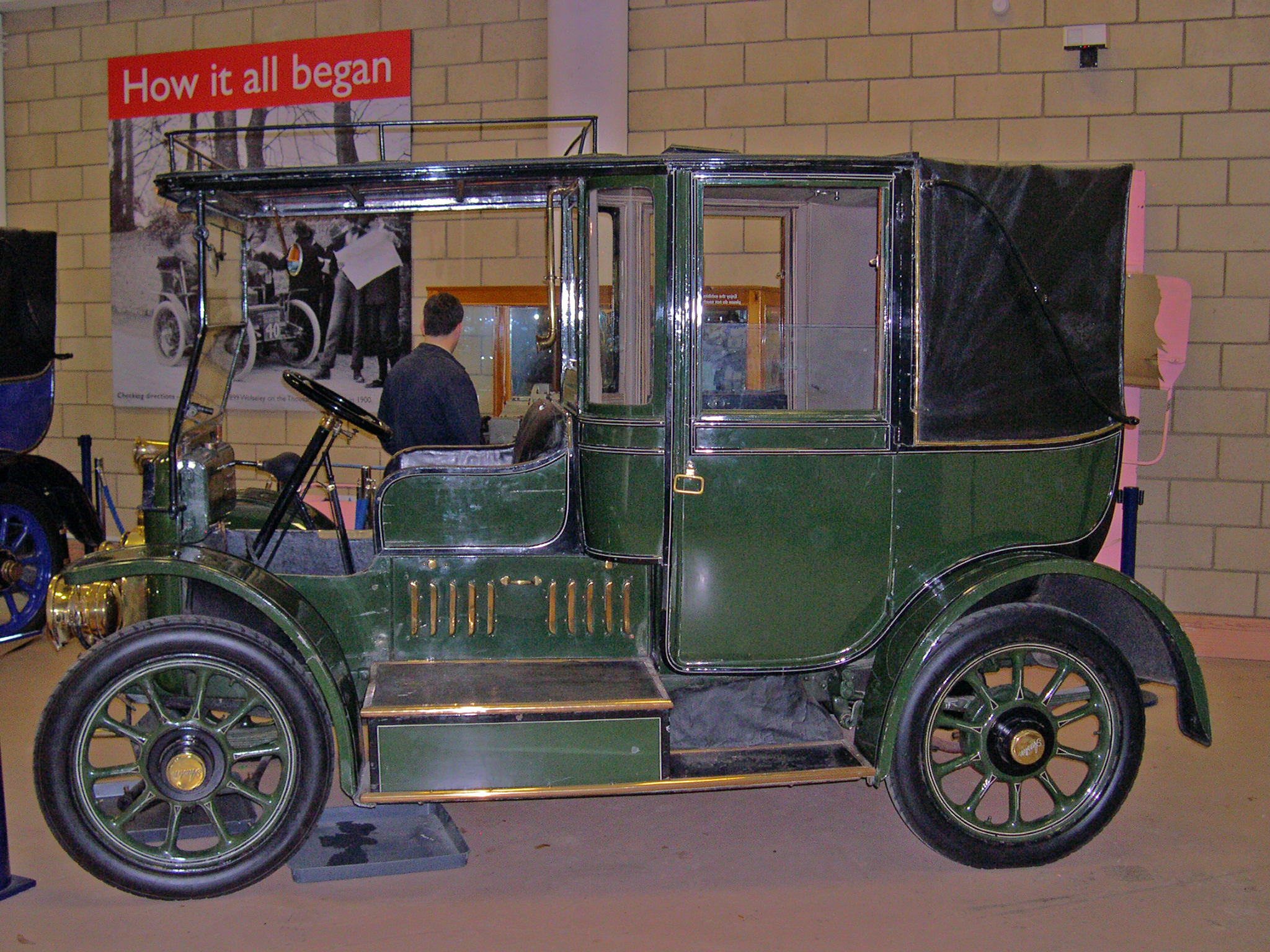
Austin town carriage 1911

The increased import duties obliged Mann & Overton to find an alternative to supplies from Unic. In the light of the new design requirements they managed to persuade Austin to re-enter the taxi market—in spite of Sir Herbert's published opinion: (Note: Prior to the first World War Austin supplied a taxi which complied with the Police regulations and had the driver alongside the engine, a more conventional vehicle replaced it in 1908. Production was not resumed in 1919)

Sir Herbert Austin then spoke of taxicab design. "For many practical reasons," he said, "the engine should be put at the rear for a taxicab operating in congested areas, and this would give a sensible and convenient means of entry and exit and better riding qualities. I look for early development in this direction."

== Mann & Overton's own Taxicabs ==
=== 1929 Upright Grand or High Lot ===
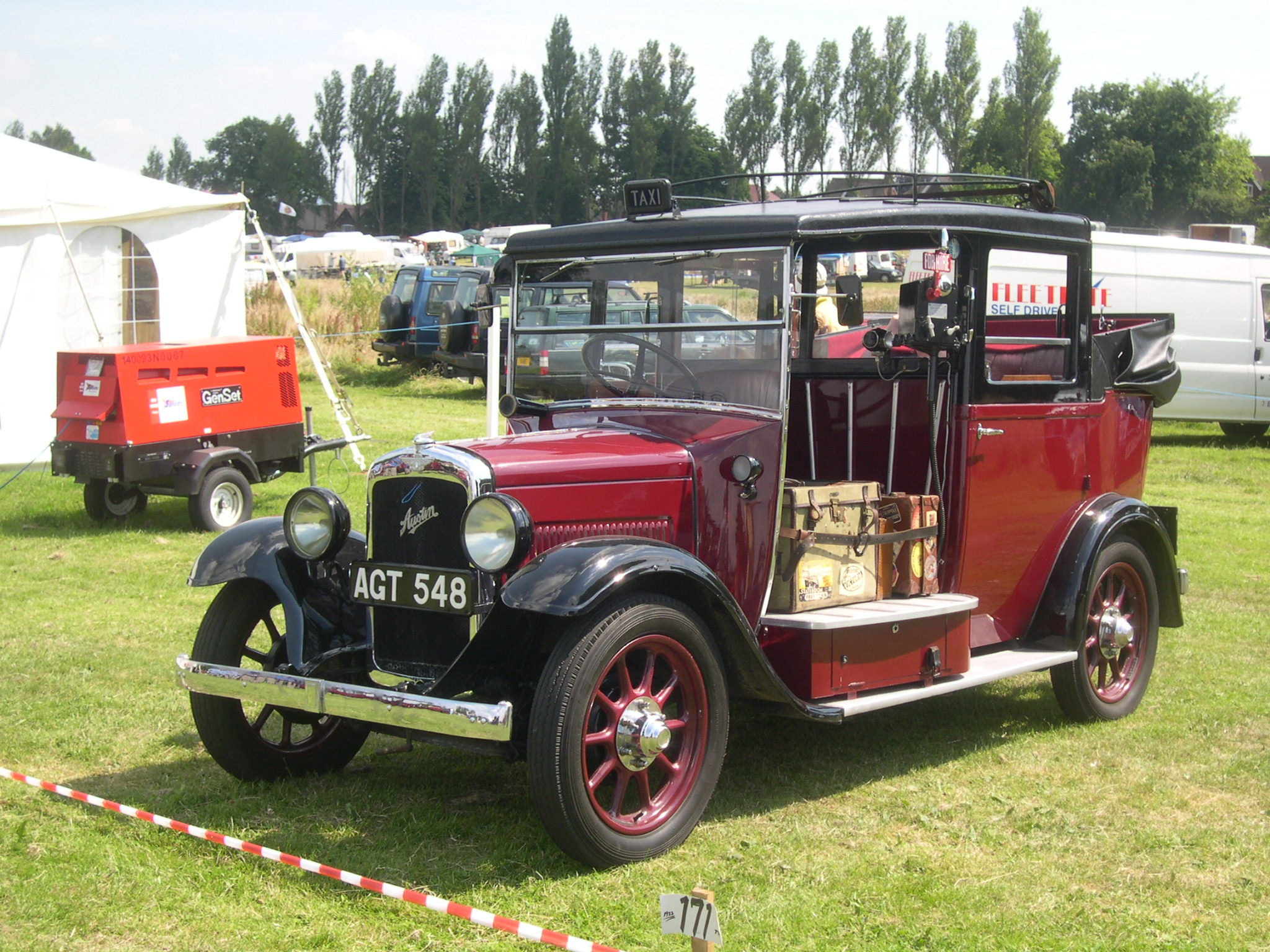
High Lot 1933

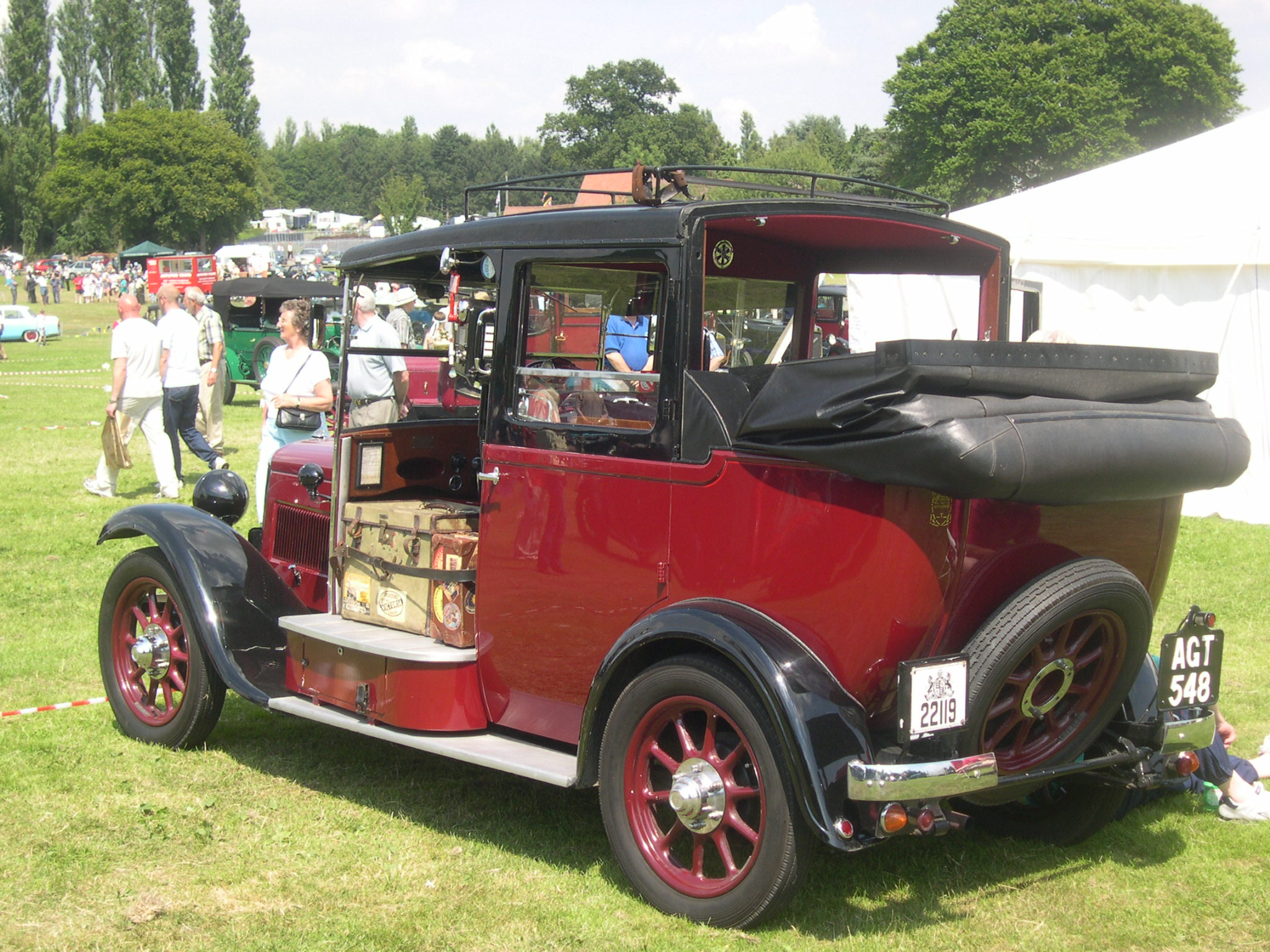
rear view

Although representative makes of new taxicabs exhibited at the 1929 London Motor Transport Show were: Morris Commercial, Beardmore, Austin and Citroen only Beardmore supplied complete taxicabs.

Up to that time Austin and others supplied only a hire car chassis intended to accept specialist bodies and their hire car chassis didn't comply with the London taxicab regulations. Austin's exhibit at this 1929 show was their new chassis on which they had amended their Heavy Twelve chassis's steering to provide a tighter turning circle and switched their cable-operated for rod-operated brakes to comply with the regulations. After that Mann & Overton's designer and coachbuilders had only to replace Austin's usual V-shaped windscreen with a flat upright screen and amend the offside front door opening of a hire car to make a luggage platform.
Most buyers chose landaulette bodywork because the very back section of the roof could be lowered in summer.
The first new generation Mann & Overton Austin entered service in April–May 1930. (Note: A New Taxicab Austin Twelve for London Next Month Scotland Yard has approved another new taxicab which, it is expected, will appear in the streets of London next month. This is an Austin Twelve which will embody all the latest features of taxicab comfort . . . unsplinterable glass will be a standard fitting. News in Brief. The Times, Thursday, Apr 03, 1930; pg. 14; Issue 45478)

The new taxicab was considerably taller than any others and was dubbed the Upright Grand but top hat wearers could use the extra space and the Heavy Twelve's engine had already proved almost indestructible in Austin's saloon cars. Mann & Overton's success was immediate. In 1930 the year of its introduction, 271 of the 540 new cabs were Austins.

The next year, 1931, Mann & Overton sold 400 Austins, the opposition—Morris Commercial, Beardmore, plus a few M&O Unics—could only manage 243 vehicles between them.

Austin further modified the chassis in 1933 adding synchromesh between third and top gears (these cars are called TT or Twin Top) and replacing the joints at the front of the propeller shaft with Hardy Spicer couplings. In addition the transmission brake was removed—the parking brake now operated on the back wheels.

=== 1934 Low Loading ===
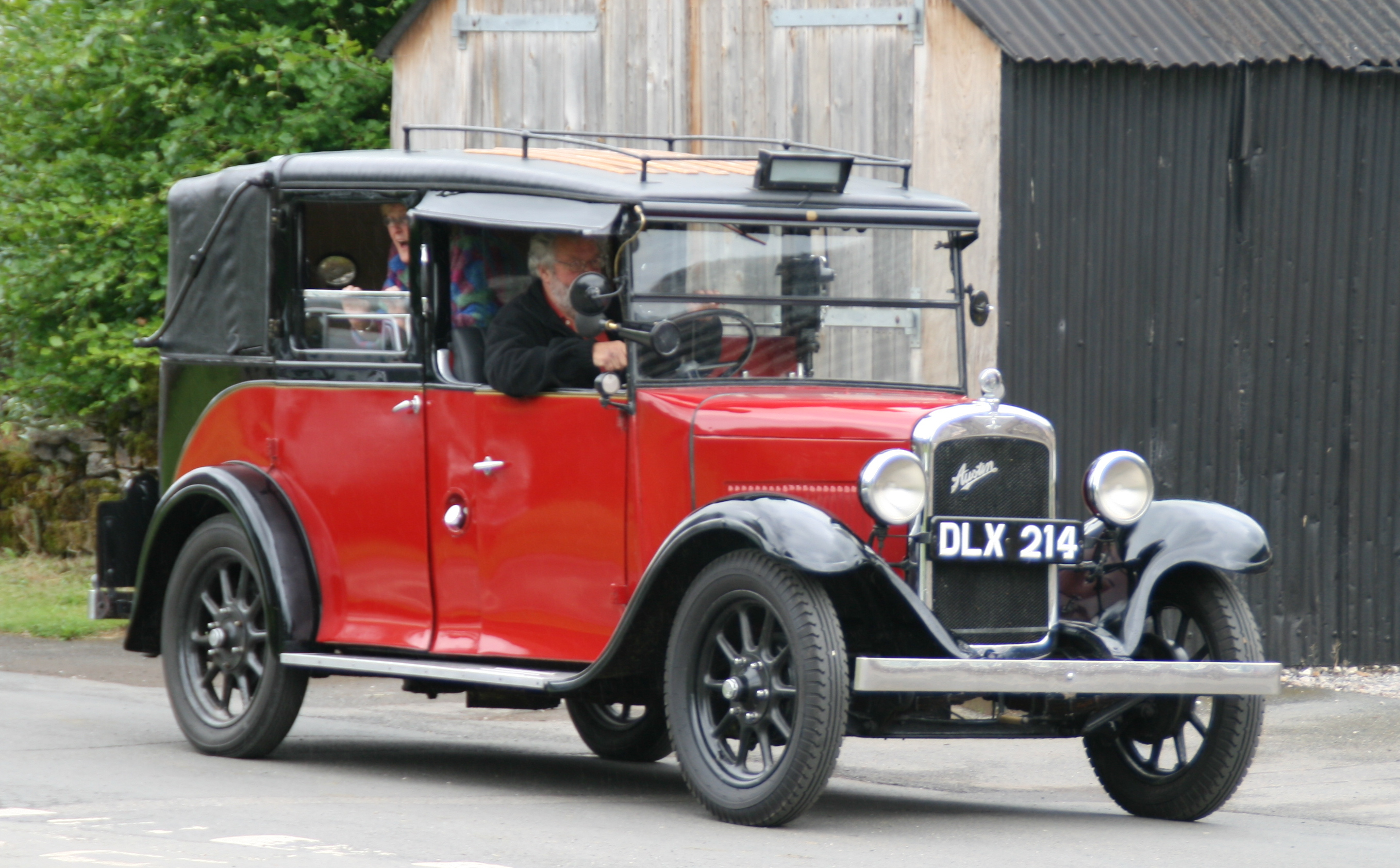
Low Loading with body by Strachan of Acton 1937

The new cab was once again designed by William Overton of Mann & Overton Limited in collaboration with Austin. Austin had redesigned the back axle relocating the propeller shaft and together with height saved by the new dropped cross-braced frame something like 7 inches was able to be removed from the car's overall height.

Again the standard body was made by Strachan of Acton. For the same price Mann & Overton would supply another by Vincent's of Reading (famous for building the royal horse boxes) or for £5 more a better finished body by Jones Brothers of Bayswater. Other suppliers included Goodland Cooper and Elkington of Chiswick.

==== 75% of new cabs sold ====
Mann & Overton's Austins dominated the market between 1930 and 1938 selling 5,850 cabs representing 75% of the market.

=== Facelift Flash Lot ===
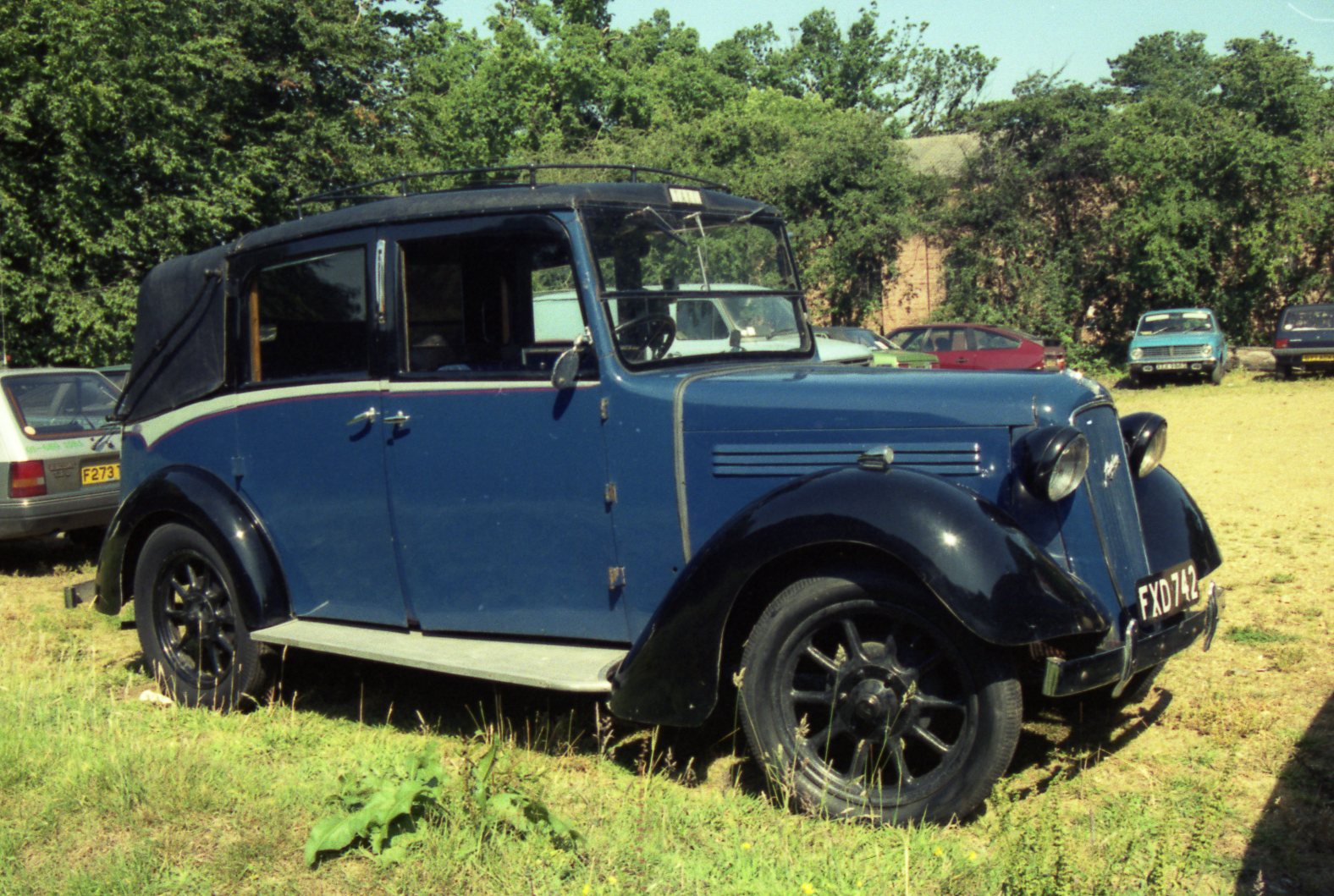
Flash Lot body by Jones Brothers of Bayswater 1939

There was one more variant before the outbreak of war, both grille and windscreen were raked, the grille and the wings (mudguards) were flared and matched those of the Austin Twelve saloon introduced in 1934. Few were made before the outbreak of war ended manufacture. These taxicabs proved to be the last with a landaulette body which was forbidden by new regulations issued soon after the war.

=== 1948—body by BSA's Carbodies FX3 ===
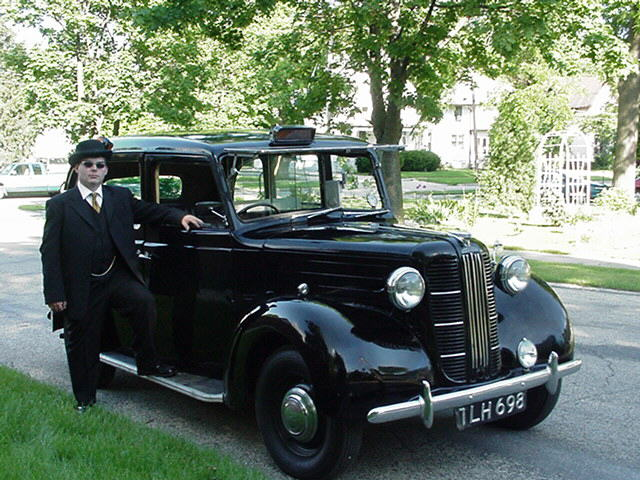
FX3 body by Carbodies of Coventry

Designed by Austin in collaboration with Robert Overton of Mann & Overton, its coachwork made by Carbodies, Austin's new Metropolitan taxicab was first exhibited in London in June 1948. Full production was to commence in August. Notable features included:

- driver's compartment completely protected from the weather having a normal door on the offside
- a partition with sliding glass windows between the driver's seat and the luggage space.

In view of the continuing restrictions a proportion of the output was to be reserved for owner-drivers to whom deliveries would be made by ballot.

This design arrived on the market a year after Morris's Nuffield Organization had begun to produce their postwar taxicab but Austin's FX3 was much more up to date. When in 1952 Morris and Austin were put together as BMC the Austin was not only more modern it was outselling the Nuffield contribution by more than two to one. Nuffield's taxi was phased out in 1954. Anticipating this move Beardmore brought out its own new design but it was not strong competition for the Austin and the Beardmore taxi business finally closed in 1969.

=== 1958 to 1997 FX4 ===
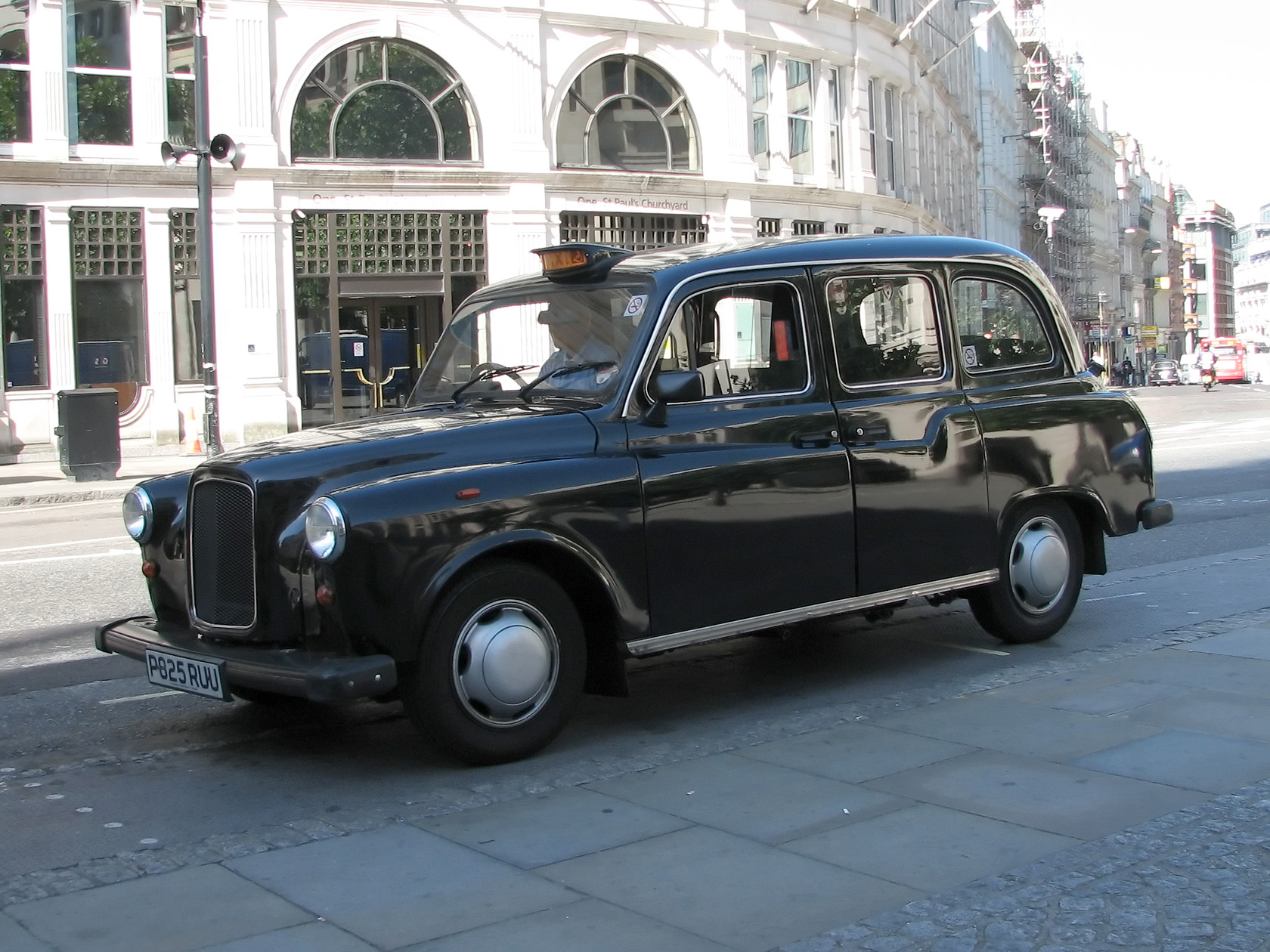
FX4 body by Carbodies of Coventry

In July 1958 the prototype of a new taxi designed by Mann & Overton was displayed to the London Press. Its new body had four conventional doors and the luggage beside the driver was now fully enclosed. The occasional seats had been made more comfortable with a sloping backrest and switches provided for a heater and an extra bright light.

The new body was again fitted to an Austin chassis but now the chassis was equipped with independent front suspension and a Borg-Warner automatic gearbox. The power unit remained the previous BMC 2.2-litre diesel engine.

At the opening of the Commercial Motor Show in September 1958 Austin announced that an order had been received from Mann & Overton for 2,000 of the new design fitted with automatic transmission.

This design remained in production until 1997, long after Mann & Overton had been swallowed by Lloyds & Scottish then Manganese Bronze.

== Ownership of Mann & Overton Limited ==
=== Listing ===
The Company which owned the business was listed on the London Stock Exchange in July 1935 in anticipation of the constant market arising after 1 January 1936 when the age limit for taxi-cabs in the London Metropolitan Police Area was to be reduced to ten years. In 1934 the business disposed of 1,111 taxi-cabs.

=== Lloyds & Scottish Finance ===
Lloyds and Scottish Finance purchased Mann & Overton in mid-1977. This was done to buy Mann & Overton's continuing lending activity and substantial lending portfolio to cab drivers.

=== Manganese Bronze Holdings ===
Manganese Bronze Holdings purchased Mann & Overton from Lloyds & Scottish in 1984. Carbodies had built Mann & Overton's Austin taxis since 1948. Manganese Bronze Holdings had absorbed Carbodies Limited with portions of the former Birmingham Small Arms Company in 1973. Taxis became Manganese Bronze's core business carried out under the name The London Taxi Company.

=== Vertical integration—The London Taxi Company ===
The London Taxi Company continued the business of Mann & Overton and Carbodies until 2013 when production problems and consequent financial difficulties brought a halt to production.
There are plans to revive the business under the ownership of Geely UK Limited.
