= Austin London Taxicab =

Motor vehicle

Austin Twelve engine 4
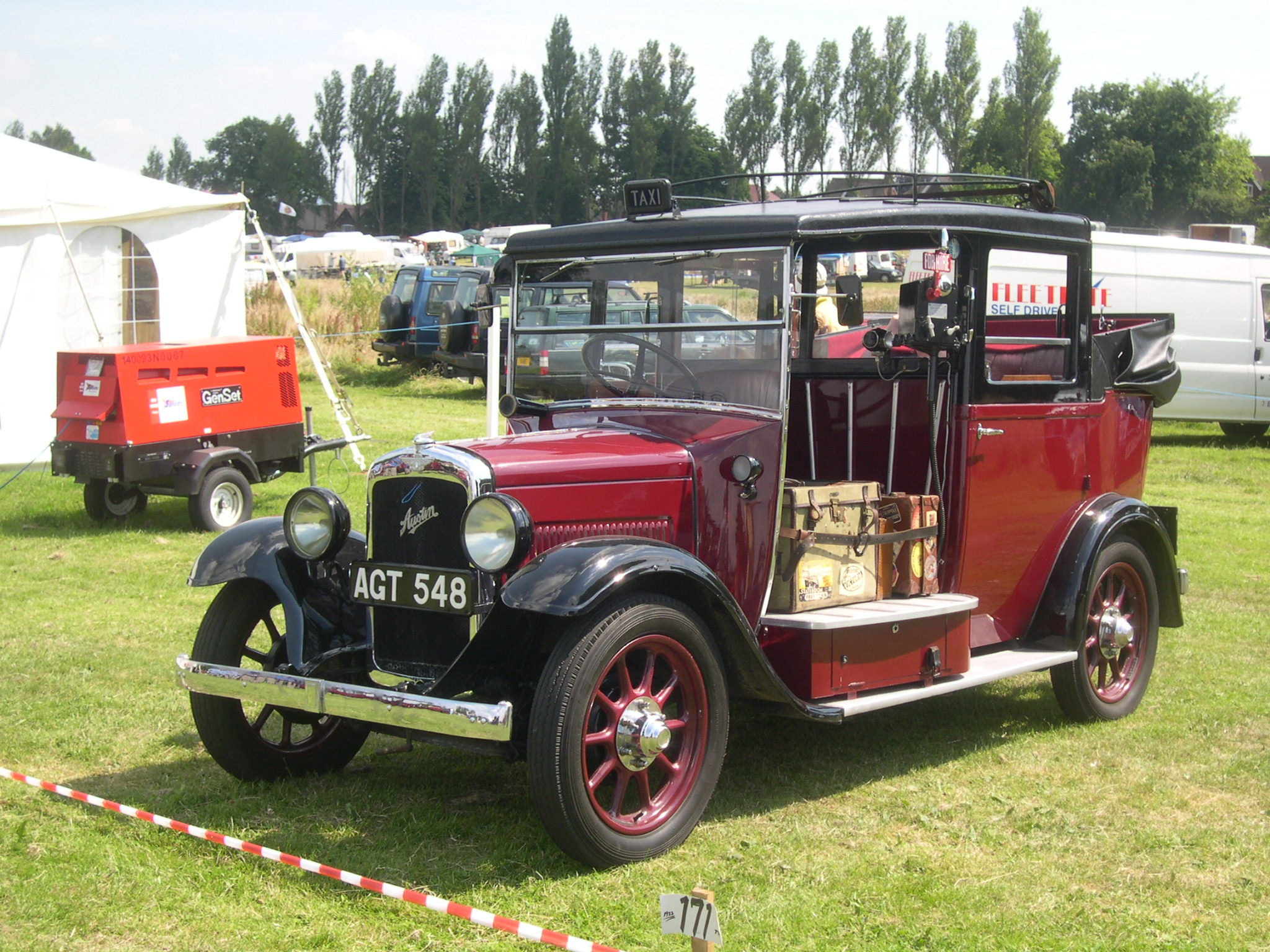
- Austin 12/4 taxicab

Overview
- Manufacturer: Austin

Layout
- Configuration: Straight 4-cylinder
- Displacement: 1,861 cc (114 cu in)
- Cylinder bore: 72 mm (2.8 in)
- Piston stroke: 114.5 mm (4.51 in)
- Cylinder block material: Cast iron, alloy crankcase. The inlet manifold is cast in one with the cylinder head
- Cylinder head material: Detachable, pistons are aluminium
- Valvetrain: Side-by-side valves, tappet covers may be easily removed, timing is driven by chain

Combustion
- Fuel system: Single carburettor supplied by a vacuum tank which draws from a reservoir beneath the driver's seat, ignition by magneto driven by chain placed behind the timing, dynamo driven by same chain
- Fuel type: Petrol
- Oil system: Lubrication by forced feed, filler on the offside
- Cooling system: Radiator, fan, cooling water is circulated by convection with no water pump fitted

Output
- Power output: 27 bhp (20 kW; 27 PS) @2,000 rpm Tax horsepower 12.8

Chronology
- Successor: Austin Twelve

The Austin London Taxicab used a modified Austin Heavy Twelve-Four chassis clothed with new bodies designed by London's largest taxicab retailer and dealer Mann & Overton, and made for them by London coachbuilders.

== History ==
Will Overton, director of the car dealership Mann & Overton, had been selling Unic taxicabs in London since 1906. In 1924 their business with its French-made Unics had provided almost 80% of the new taxicabs bought in London. In 1925, with effect from 1 May 1926, McKenna duties were imposed on commercial vehicles to protect UK manufacturers from imports and in spite of Unic's local assembly operation in Cricklewood, opened in 1928, it was no longer possible to supply London with French Unic taxicabs at an acceptable price. So William Overton approached Herbert Austin about modifying the Heavy Twelve-Four hire car chassis so that it would comply with the London Conditions of Fitness. It had been announced in 1927 that those regulations would be lightened with effect from 1928. In view of the easing of police regulations and the enormous gap in the market left by imported vehicles Austin duly modified their hire-car chassis to suit, and Mann & Overton arranged for their catalogued three standard bodies made in Greater London by: Strachan or Vincent or – for £5 more – Jones.

From 1930 to 1934 this first Austin London taxicab was colloquially known as the High Lot or Upright Grand. On a new chassis and thereby much lowered its appearance was revised in 1934 and it was renamed by Austin the Low Loading taxi.

Previously Austin had only provided hire car chassis not troubling to make major amendments to that chassis to comply with Metropolitan Police regulations for London taxicabs.

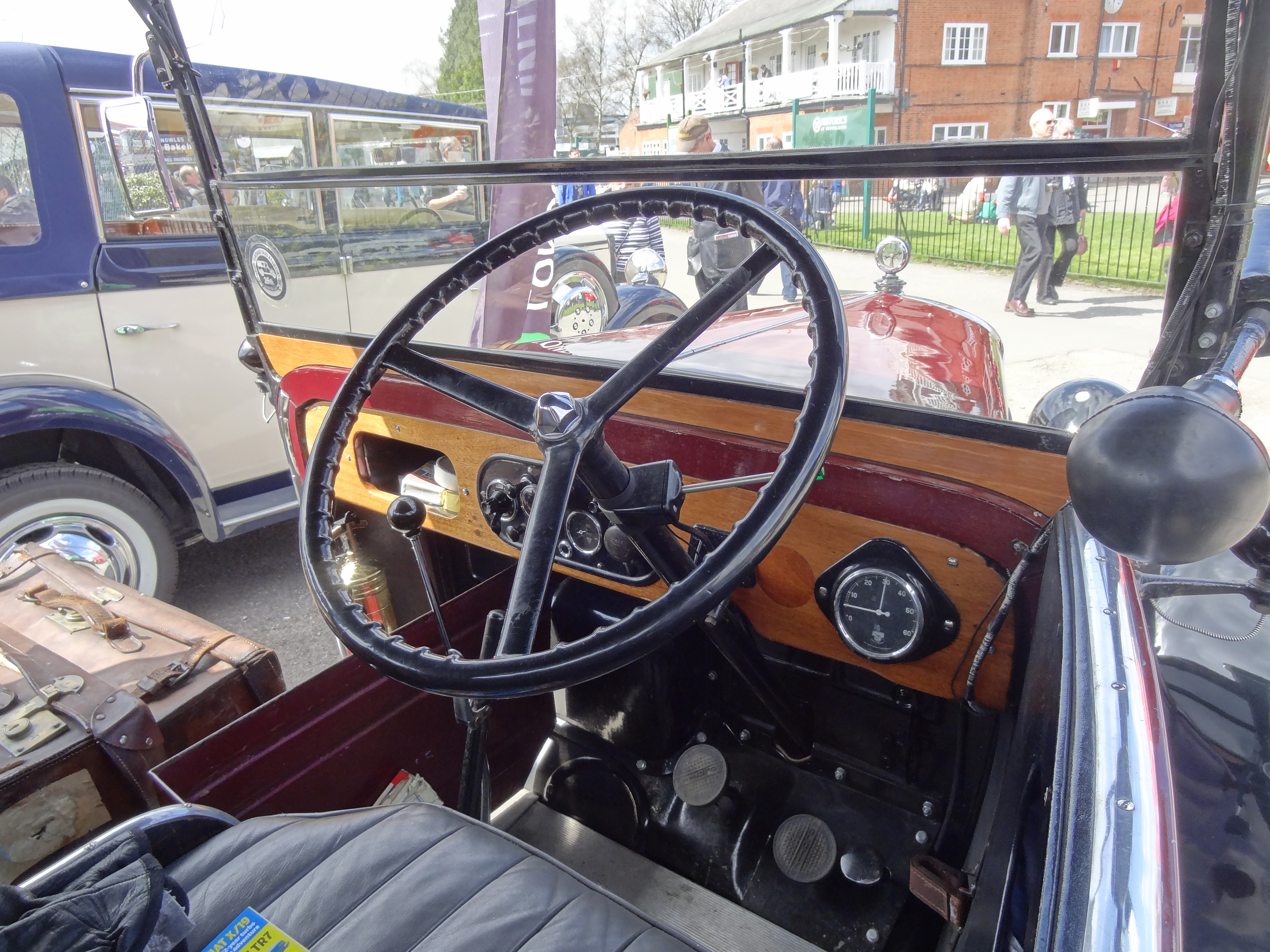
1934 Austin Taxi, body by Jones Brothers

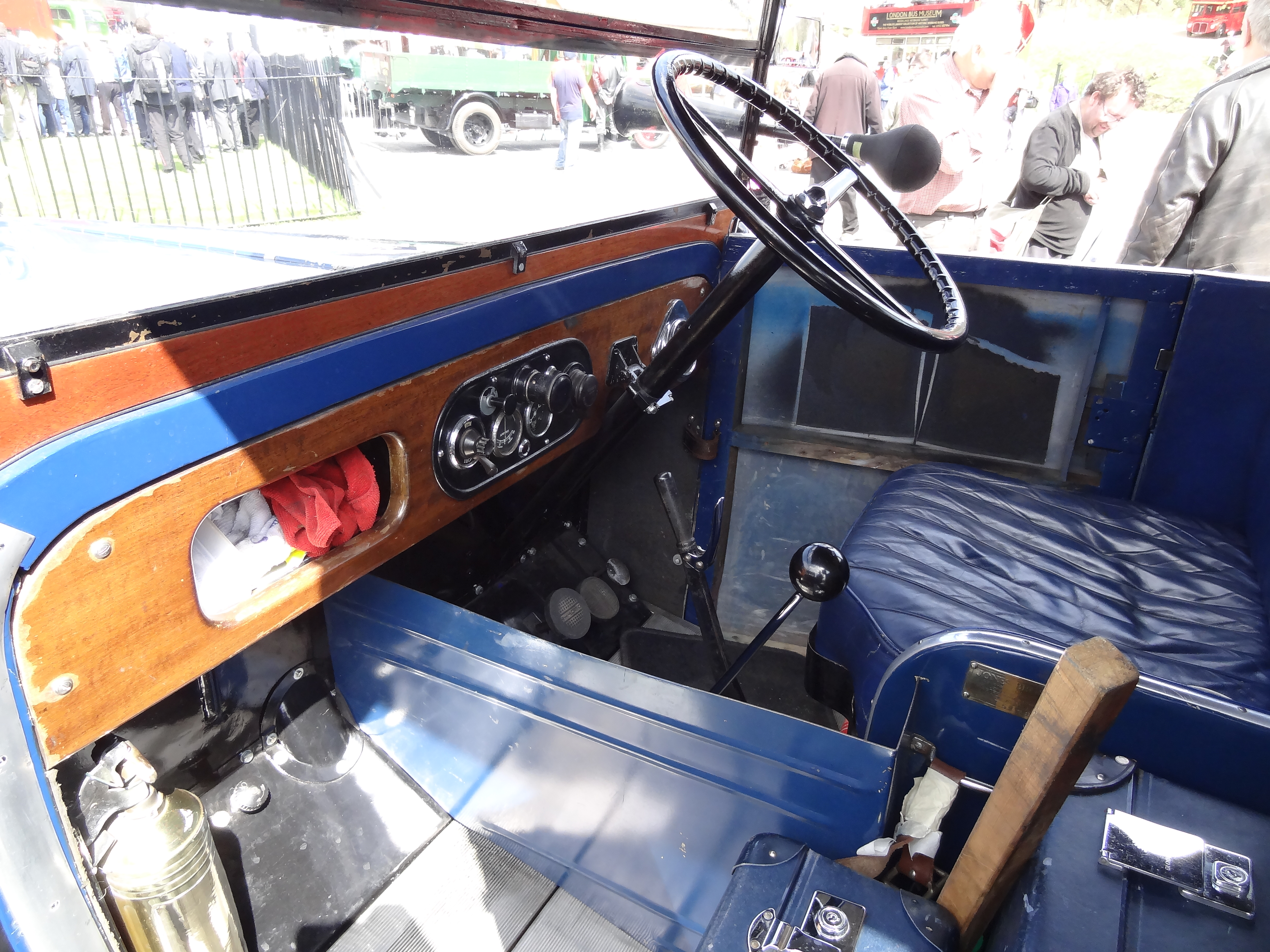

=== High Lot ===
Because the overall height of the 1930 version (Note: A New Taxicab Austin Twelve for London Next Month Scotland Yard has approved another new taxicab which, it is expected, will appear in the streets of London next month. This is an Austin Twelve which will embody all the latest features of taxicab comfort ... unsplinterable glass will be a standard fitting. "News in Brief". The Times. No. 45478. 3 April 1930. p. 14.) was much greater than the competition it received the nickname High Lot (HL) or Upright Grand. This design gave top hat wearing customers plenty of room. It was soon outselling the Beardmore and Morris-Commercial versions.

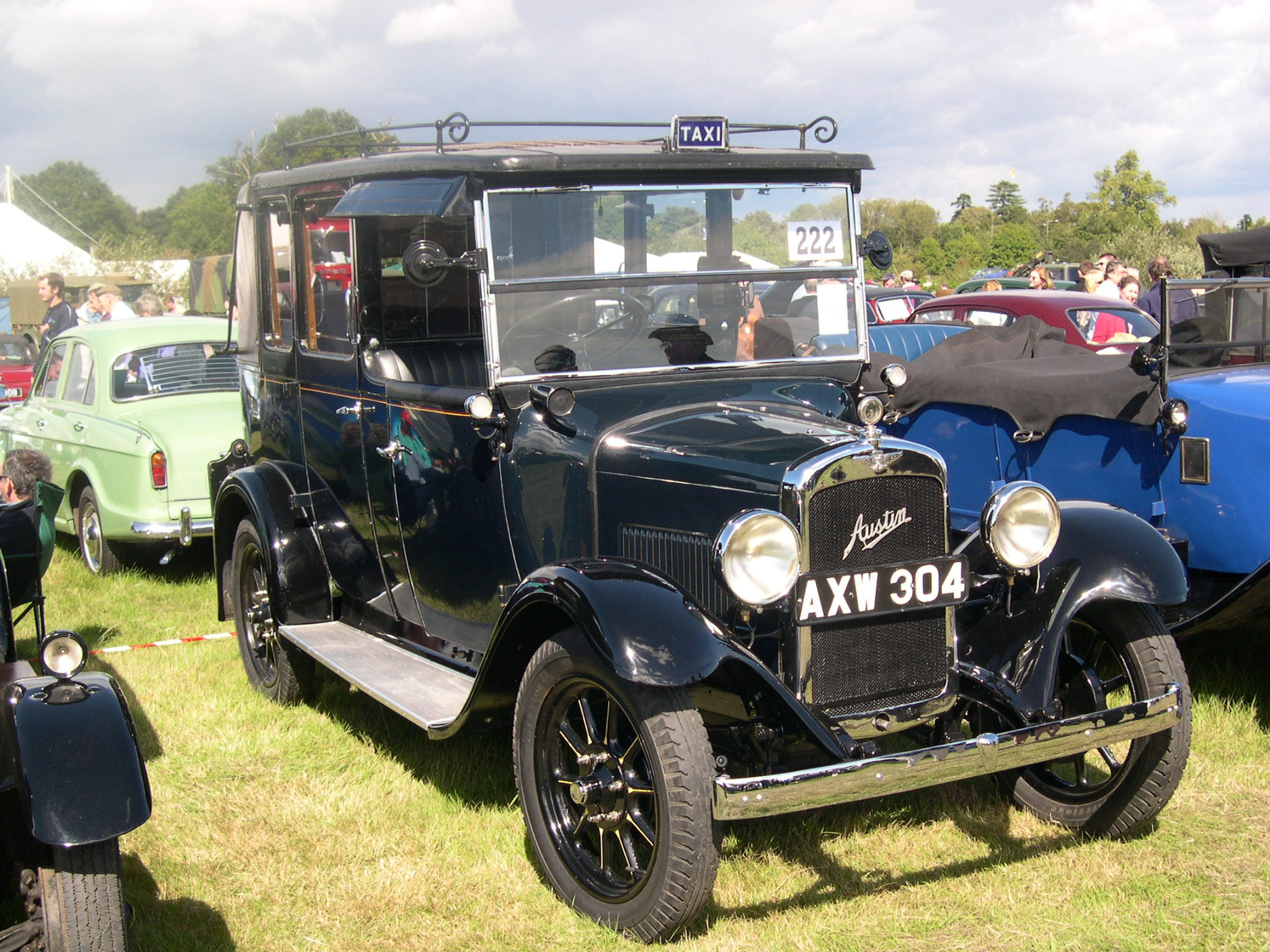
1933 Austin 12/4 HL by Vincent of Reading

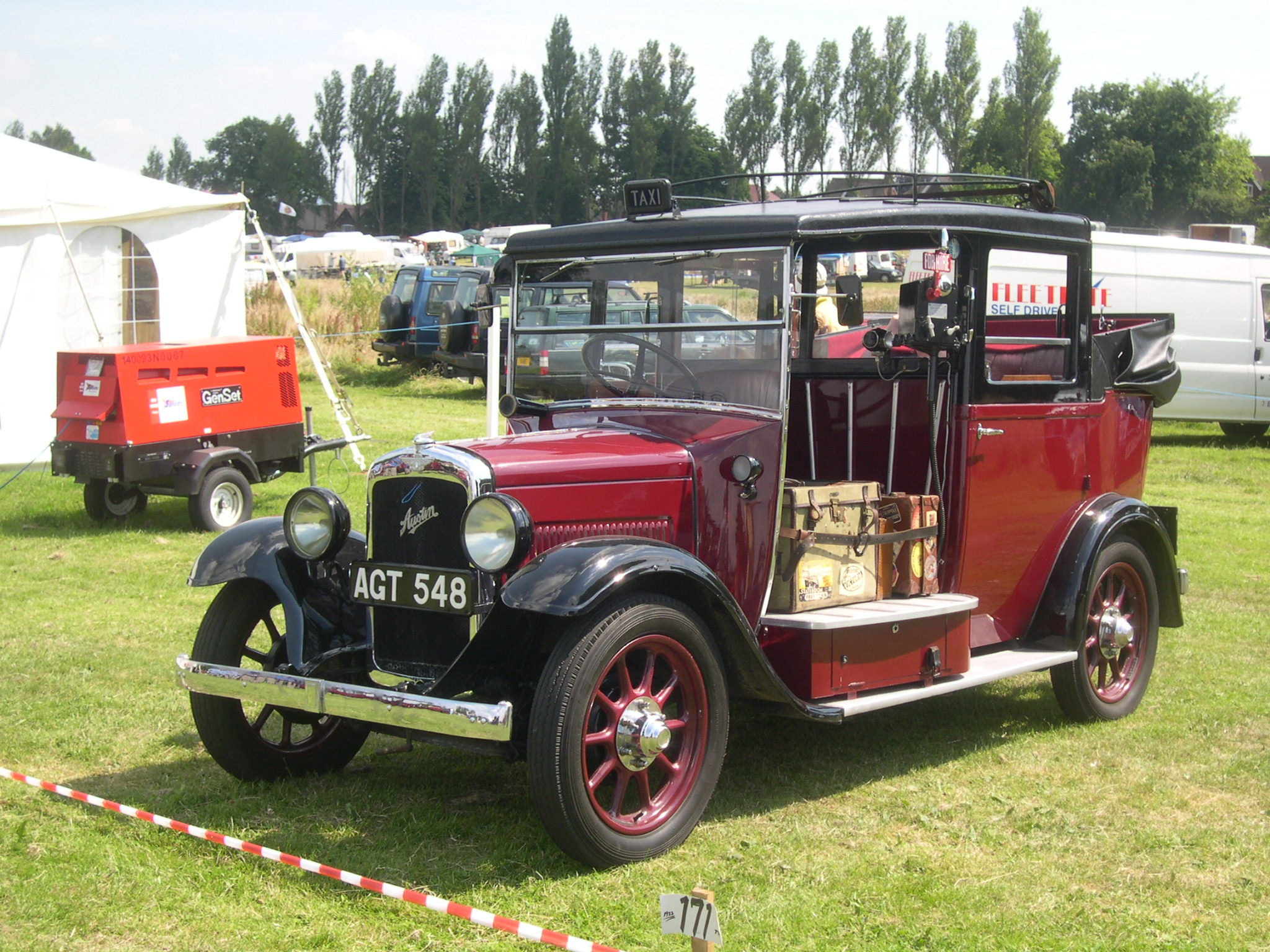
1934 HL

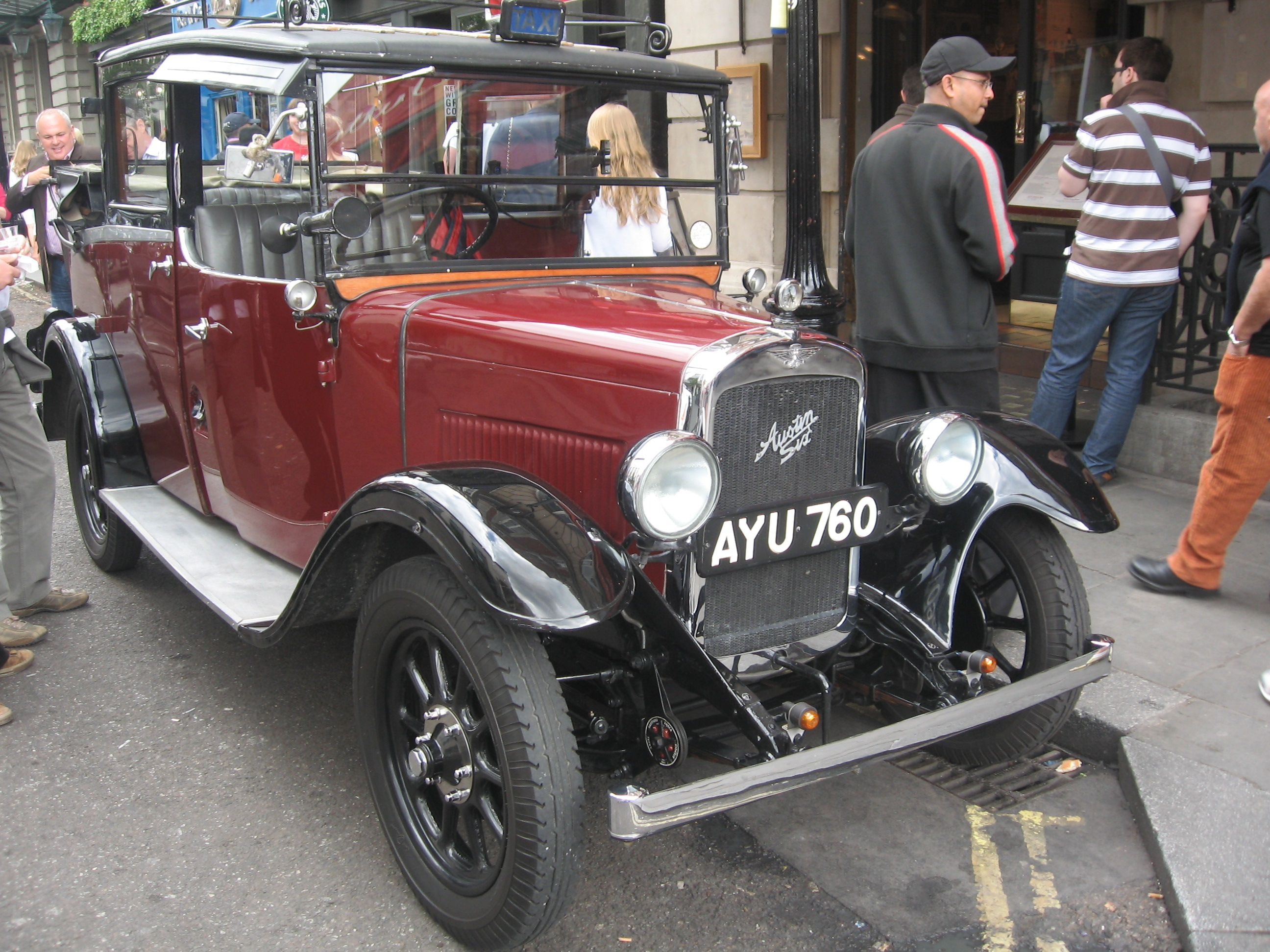
1934 Austin 6 HL

=== Low Loading ===
Their new Low Loading (LL) taxicab was introduced in 1934 with an overall height some 7 inches lower arranged by using the redesigned back axle (the final drive was switched from overhead to underslung) and dropped cross-braced frame introduced by Austin for their new Light Twelve-Four and Light Twelve-Six cars.

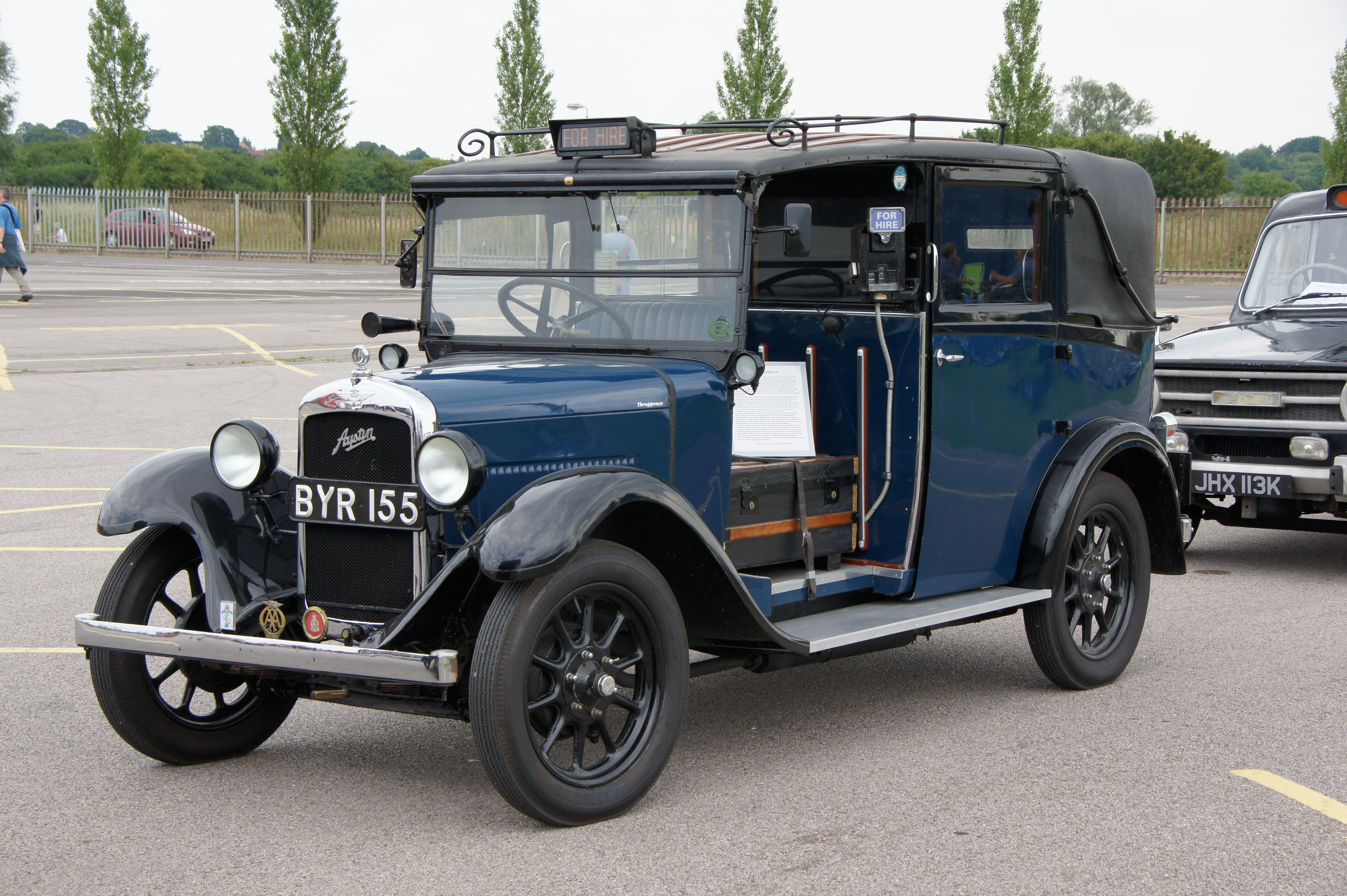
LL body by Jones Brothers

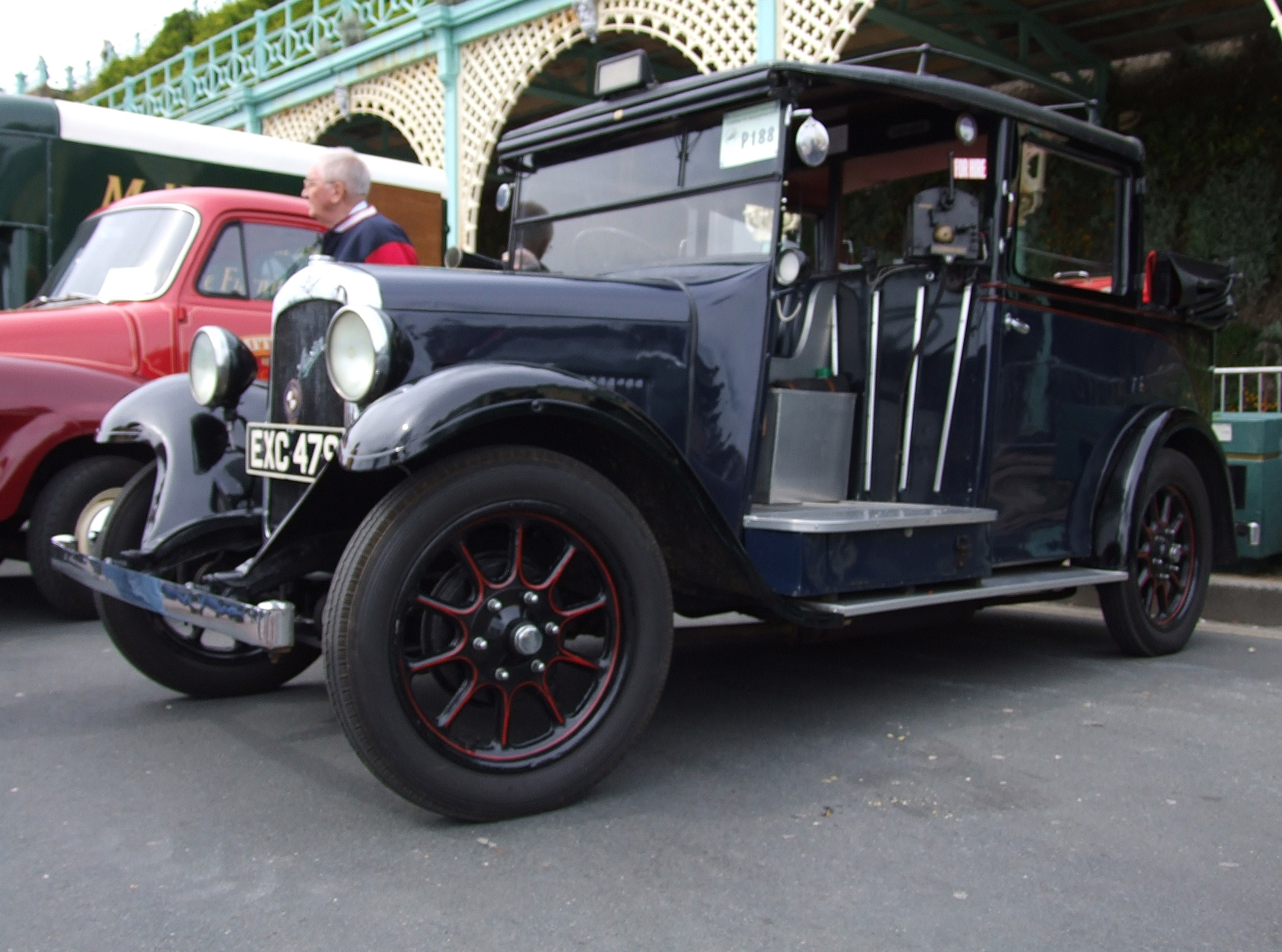
1938 Austin LL

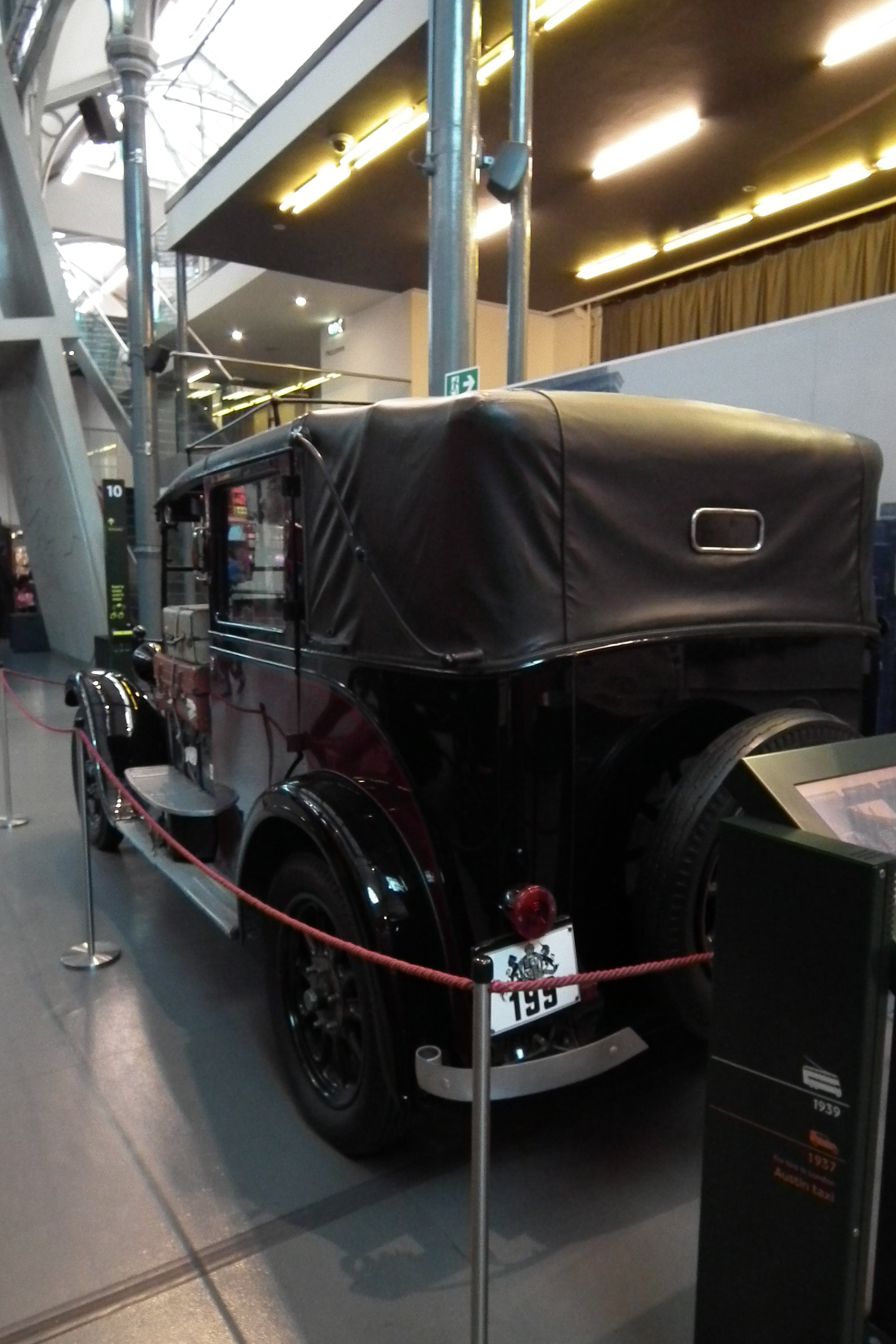
1937 Austin LL, rear view

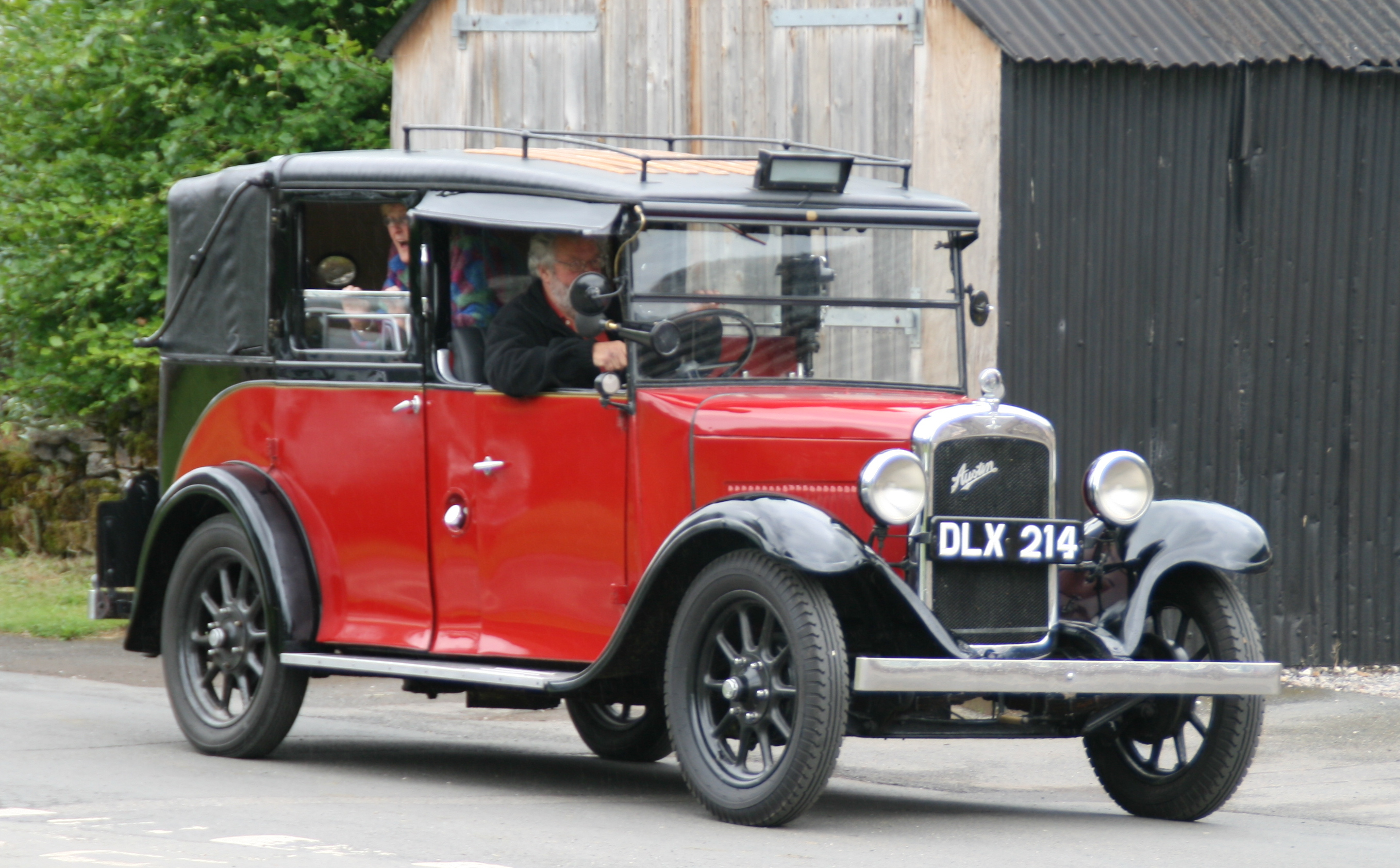
LL by Strachan of Acton 1937

Standard equipment included a luxuriously upholstered Standard Cab Landaulette body, cellulose blue with full windscreen, and both front and rear bumpers. Fire extinguisher, horn, number plates, licence holder, taxi sign, Trico visional wiper and speedometer were also included.

All exterior fittings were chromium plated. The list price was £395. Hire purchase terms were £50 deposit with monthly installments of £10, for a total price of £472, or £18 less if purchased completed in 40 months (rebate reduced by £3 for each additional month.)

=== Flash Lot ===
There was one more variant before the outbreak of war, both grille and windscreen were raked, the grille and the wings (mudguards) were flared and matched those of the Austin Twelve saloon introduced in 1934. Few were made before the outbreak of war ended manufacture. These taxicabs proved to be the last with a landaulette body, which was forbidden by new regulations issued soon after the war.

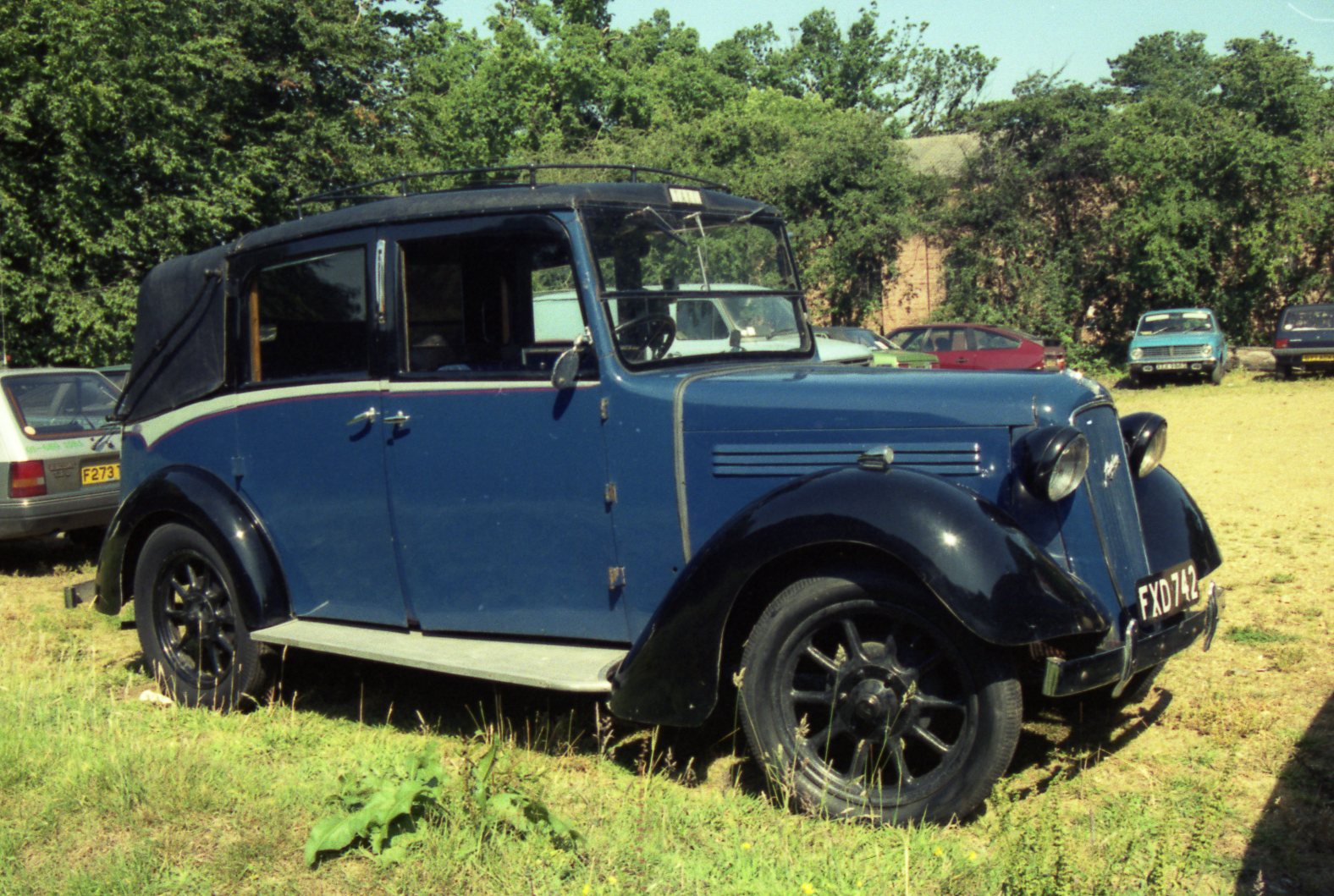
1939 Flash Lot body by Jones Brothers of Bayswater 1939

== At Work ==
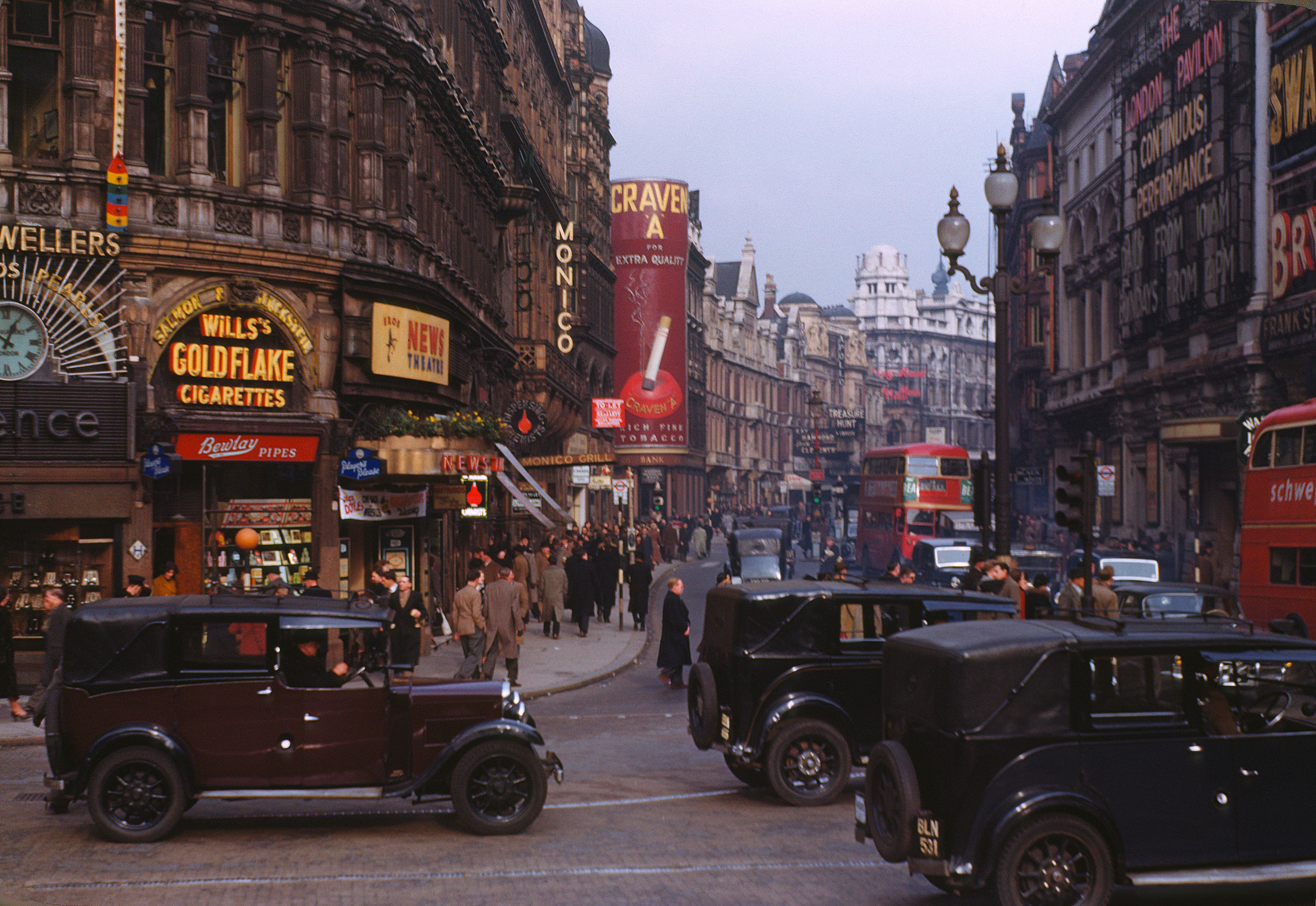
Shaftesbury Avenue from Piccadilly Circus, in the West End of London, 1949

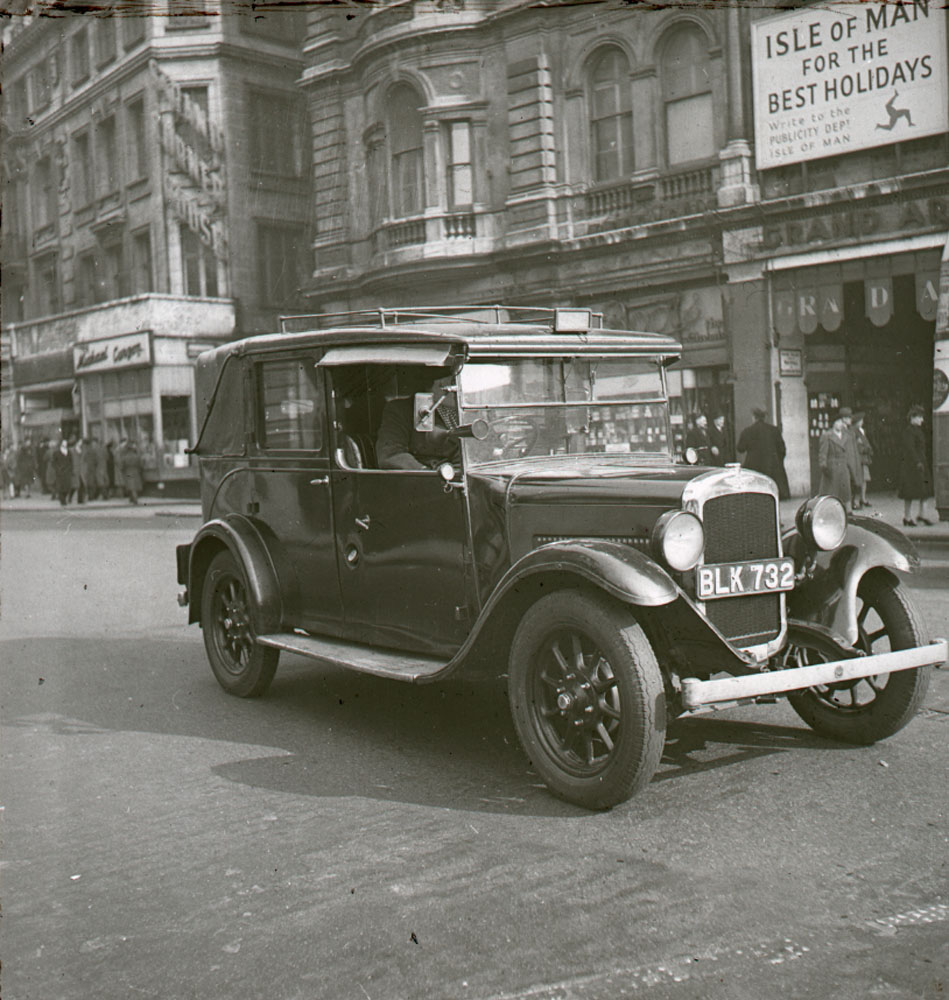
London, 1946

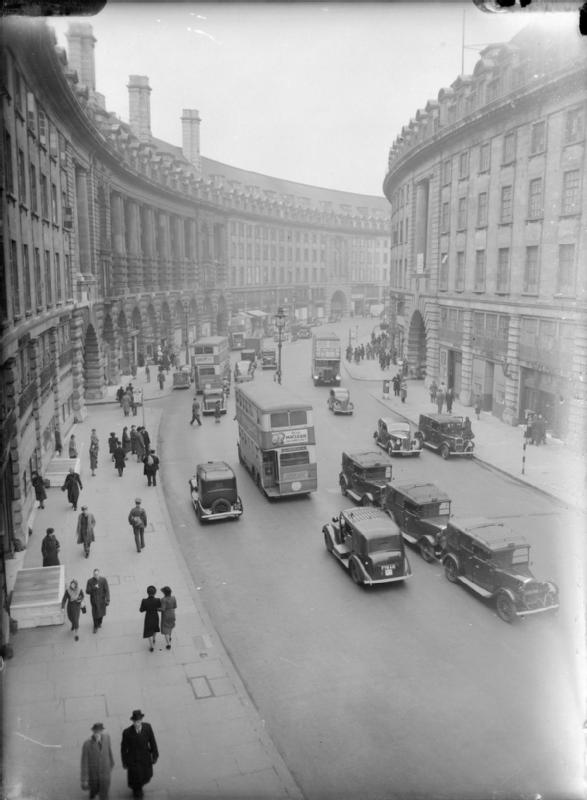
London, 1941

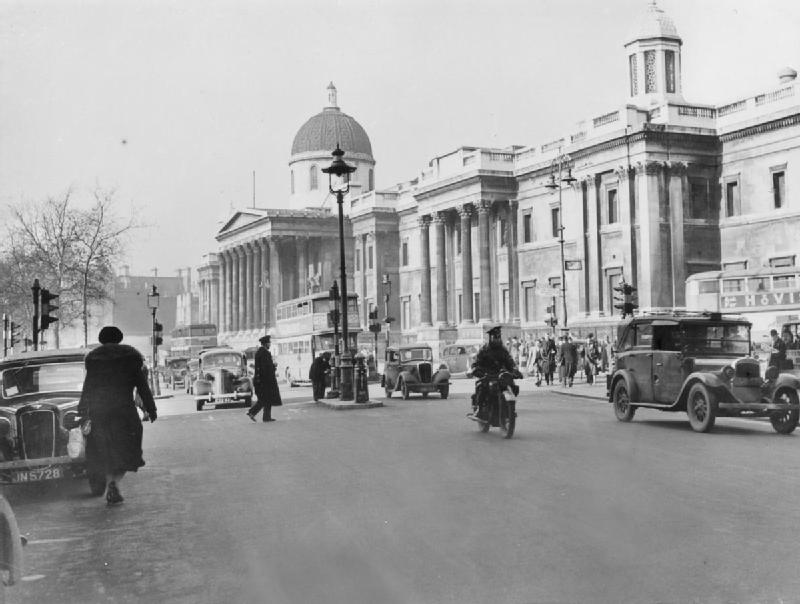
London, 1941

== Replacement ==
After the Second World War, Mann & Overton decided that it needed a more up-to-date design. So it was agreed that Austin would supply the engine/chassis and Carbodies in Coventry the body, although it was actually designed by Austin's chief body designer Jim Stanfield. In 1948 a new Austin taxi appeared on the streets called the FX3. It was soon the market leader. Although in 1952 a diesel engine from Perkins Engines was available as a conversion, by 1954 Austin was producing their own 2.2 litre diesel engine as a factory fit. Also made by Austin and Carbodies was the hire car FL1 which was almost identical but lacking luggage space by the driver, having instead a bench seat, and there was no roof sign.

== See also ==
- List of Austin motor vehicles § London Taxicabs
