= Austin FX3 =

Austin FX3 Metropolitan taxi
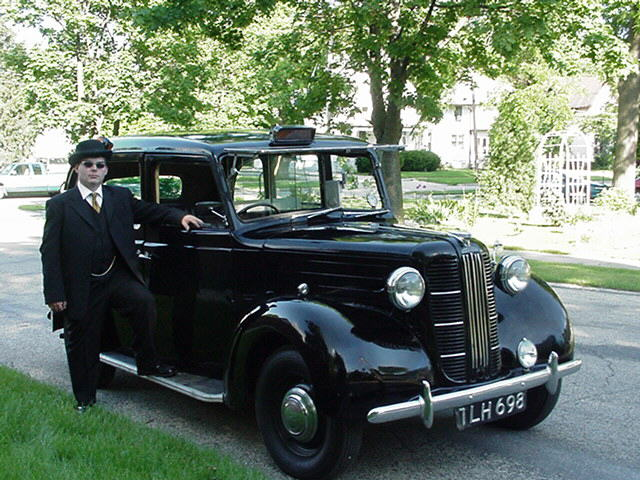

Overview
- Manufacturer: Carbodies; Austin (BMC)
- Production: 1948–1958
- Assembly: United Kingdom: Coventry, England (Carbodies: final assembly)

Body and chassis
- Body style: 3-door taxicab

Powertrain
- Engine: 2.2-litre ohv petrol/later models diesel
- Transmission: 4-speed manual

Dimensions
- Wheelbase: 9 ft 2 5/8 in (2,810 mm)
- Length: 14 ft 5 1/4 in (4,401 mm)
- Width: 5 ft 7 1/2 in (1,714 mm)

Chronology
- Predecessor: Austin Low Loader Taxi
- Successor: Austin FX4

The Austin FX3 is a taxicab that was sold in the United Kingdom by Austin from 1948 to 1958. It was designed to comply with the Metropolitan Police Conditions of Fitness for London taxicabs, but was also used in other towns and cities in the UK. It was commissioned from Austin by taxi dealers Mann & Overton and built by Carbodies of Coventry on a chassis supplied by Austin.

== Prototype ==
The first prototype, the FX had a 1.8-litre sidevalve engine that proved inadequate for the job. The second prototype, the FX2 had a 1.8-litre petrol engine, but this was replaced by the third version, the FX3, which had a 2.2-litre ohv petrol engine, based on the Austin A70 engine. Fitted with an all-steel body from Carbodies the FX3 was registered as JXN 842, and it and the FX2 (registered as JXN 841) went on test in the summer of 1948. It was announced at the Commercial Motor Exhibition in the following November and went into full production in 1949.

Following on from previous designs of London taxi, the FX3 had a traditional 3-door body, with an open luggage platform rather than a front passenger seat beside the driver. The FX3 was fitted with mechanical brakes with rod operation, beam axles on leaf springs and a built-in Jackall hydraulic jacking system. Like all London taxis, it has a tight turning circle of 25 ft (7.6m) diameter, as required by the Conditions of Fitness.

The petrol engine proved too expensive to run and a conversion to a Standard diesel engine was offered by taxi and bus proprietors Birch Brothers of Kentish Town. A 3-litre Perkins engine was also offered and these, as well as pressure from Mann & Overton prompted the Austin Motor Company to develop their own diesel engine. This appeared in 1956 and quickly became the most popular choice in the FX3. The FX3's manual transmission has four forward speeds plus reverse, with synchromesh on all but first gear. In 1957-1958 a series of automatic transmission test vehicles were manufactured, of which only two are known to survive.

Outside London, cab operators in major UK cities like Manchester, Birmingham, Glasgow and Liverpool ran FX3s, either bought new or when they were retired from service in the capital. Examples of four-door FX3s were known to run in Manchester, where, in common with every other UK local authority outside London different taxi licensing regulations were enforced. Several FX3s were exported to Madrid, Spain and proved successful. Attempts to sell them to the United States were a failure.

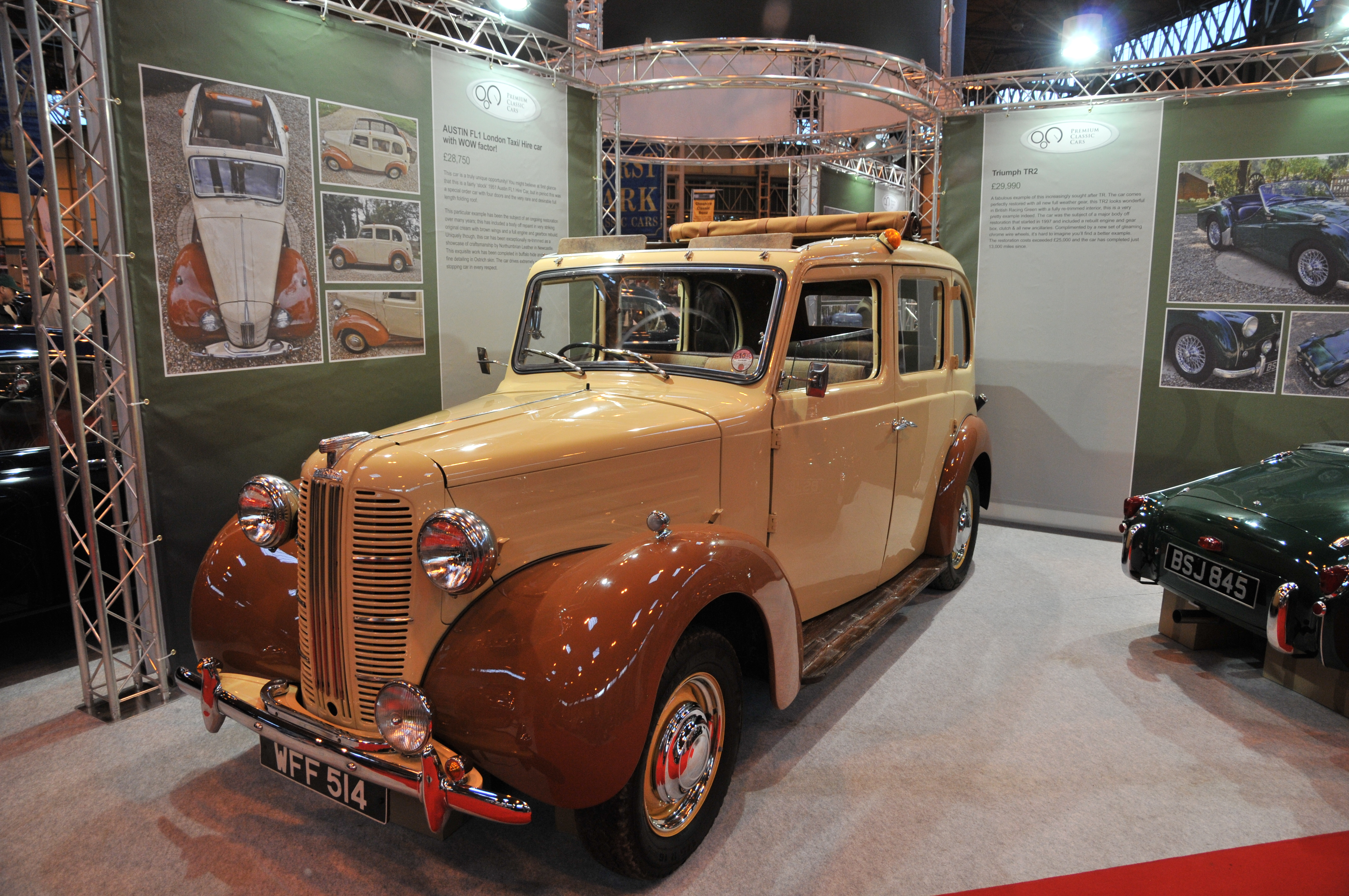
Austin's standard hire car body FL1

A Hire Car version, the FL1 was also made, which had four full doors, a bench front seat, column gear-change and an umbrella-type handbrake handle. The two occasional seats faced forward. A 'driveaway' chassis-cab was also supplied to outside coachbuilders. Several shooting brake ('woodie' ) bodies were made, as well as newspaper vans for the three London evening papers, the Star, News and Standard. A number of hearse bodies were also mounted on FL1 chassis by such coachbuilders as Simpson and Slater, Alpe and Saunders, Arthur Mulliner and Woodall Nicholson. Undoubtedly the most remarkable body built on an FX3 chassis belonged to Armenian oil magnate Nubar Gulbenkian. Built by London coachbuilders FLM Panelcraft, it was an open-drive town car, with carriage lamps and wickerwork decoration on the body sides. It was powered by a Ford six cylinder engine.

The FX3 was a popular model. Out of a combined production total of 12,435 FX3 and FL1 models, 7,267 were licensed in London between 1948 and the end of production in 1958.

The FX3 was replaced in 1958 by the Austin FX4, but continued in use in London until 1968. Many other examples ran for longer outside London. In turn, the FX4 ceased production in 1997 and was replaced by the TX series.

The Austin FX3 is still sought after by collectors and enthusiasts of vintage London Transport. Several Austin FX3s have been shipped to the United States of America and to continental Europe by collectors, hobbyists and for use as advertisement icons.

Carbodies became part of LTI (London Taxis International) and from 2010 was known as The London Taxi Company. It is now LEVC and is part of the Geely Group

== See also ==
- Taxicabs of the United Kingdom
- Hackney carriage
