= Nuffield Oxford Taxi =

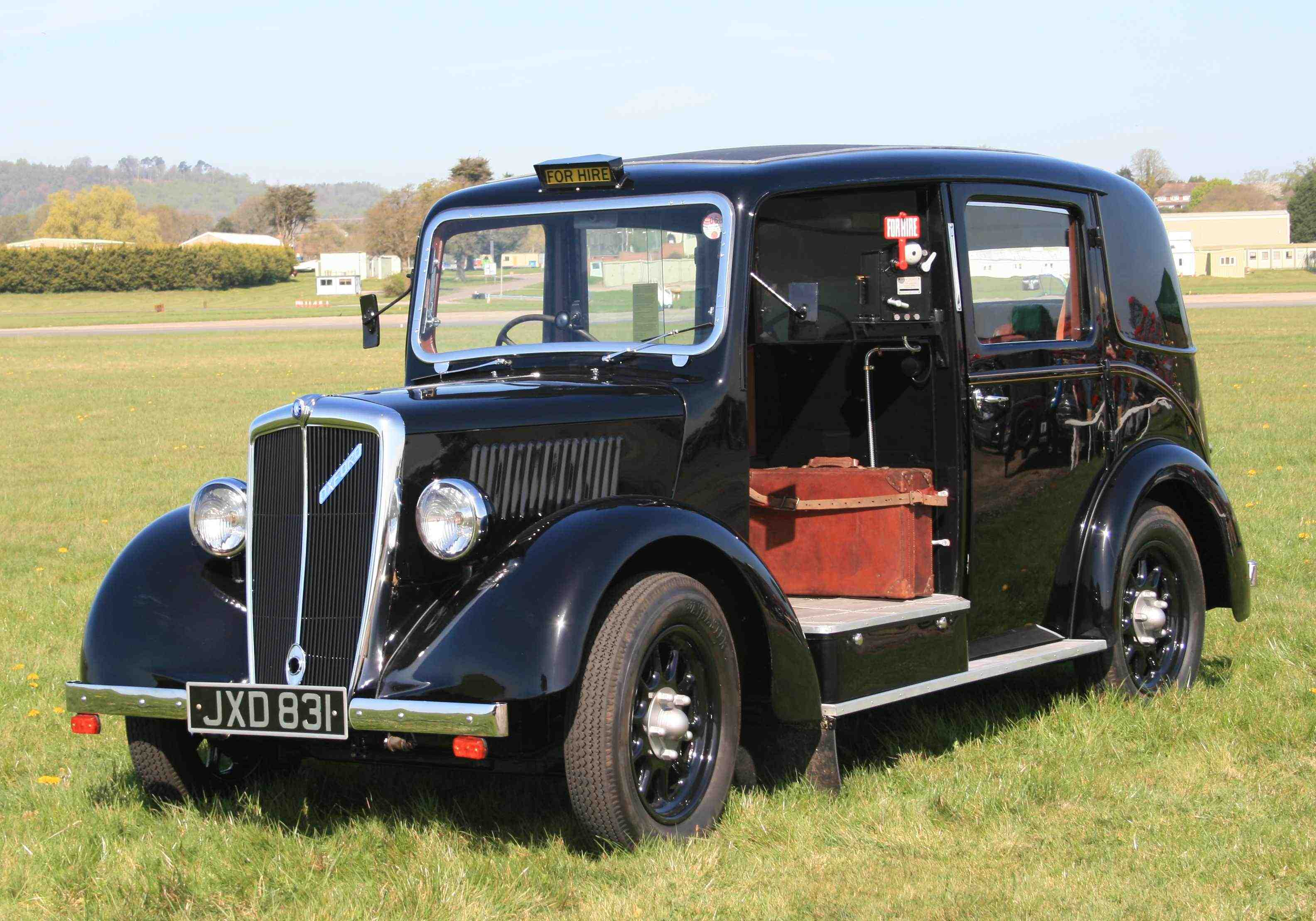
- Nuffield Oxford Series I

Overview
- Manufacturer: Nuffield
- Also called: Wolseley Oxford
- Model years: 1947–1953
- Assembly: Ward End Birmingham, later Adderley Park, Birmingham
- Designer: Chassis: Charles van Eugen

Body and chassis
- Body style: London taxi, fixed head
- Layout: Limousine

Powertrain
- Engine: 1802 cc Nuffield OHV I4 (petrol)
- Transmission: Nuffield 4-speed manual

Dimensions
- Wheelbase: 8 ft 11 1/2 in (2,730 mm)
- Length: 13 ft 11 1/2 in (4,254 mm)
- Width: 5 ft 6 in (1,680 mm)

Chronology
- Predecessor: Morris-Commercial G2SW

The Nuffield Oxford Taxi, initially produced as the Wolseley Oxford Taxicab was the first new taxicab designed to comply with the Metropolitan Police Conditions of Fitness for London taxicabs to be launched on the British market after the end of the Second World War.

== Royal wedding ==
The Oxford was introduced at the Commercial Motor Exhibition of 1947, and a fleet of new cabs served to carry guests from the wedding of Princess Elizabeth and Philip Mountbatten (late Queen Elizabeth II and the Duke of Edinburgh) at Westminster Abbey in November of that year.

== Design ==
The prototype, designed by Morris-Commercial, registration number EOM 844 was built in 1940 and was fitted with a landaulette body by Jones Brothers of Westbourne Grove, London. It accumulated a recorded 300,000 miles (480,000 km) in tests throughout the Second World War.

=== New regulations ===
Changes in the Conditions of Fitness after the Second World War banned the landaulette style of body and the production vehicle was fitted with a fixed head body, of pressed steel over a wood frame. With its limousine configuration and open luggage platform beside the driver, it was in every other respect the same style as all previous London taxis. It was the last new design to be launched at the historic Ward End, Birmingham, plant which had been Wolseley's home since 1919.

=== Specification ===
It was powered by an 1802-cc, petrol inline-four engine with a dry sump, based on an industrial version of an engine used in pre-war Morris and MG cars. The gearbox had four speeds with synchromesh on second, third, and top. The brakes were mechanically operated by rods and the back axle was worm gear driven. A four-door hire car version was also made.

== Manufacture and distribution ==
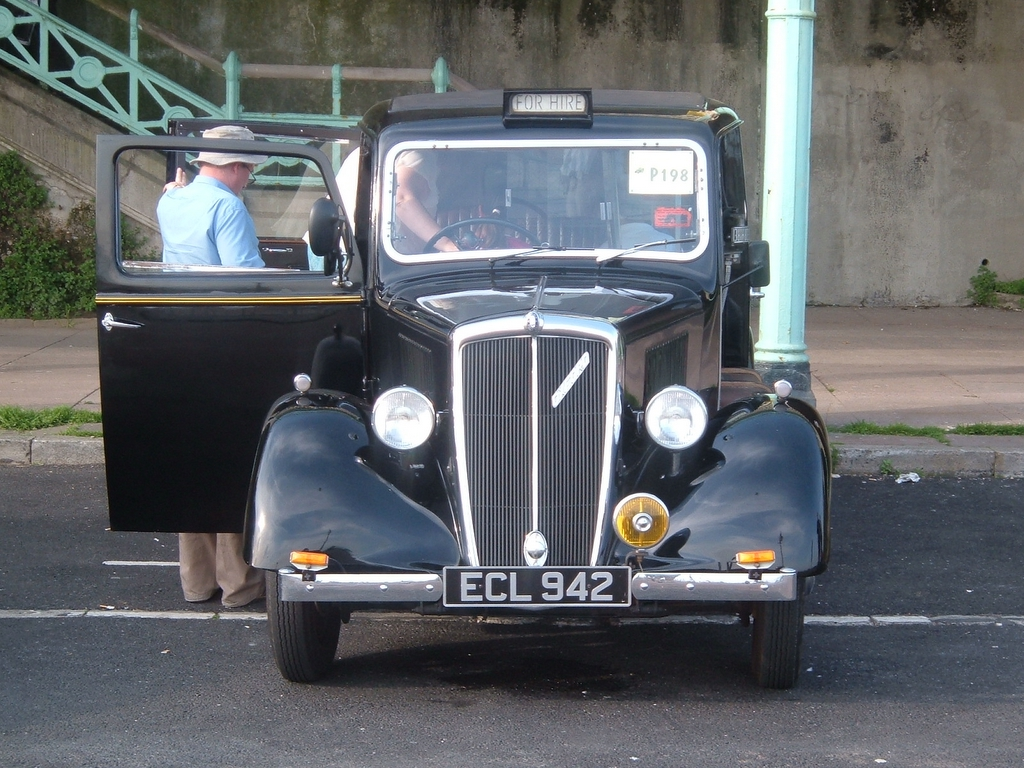
This 1950 car is registered as a Morris

Production was transferred to Nuffield's Adderley Park factory in 1948, and continued until 1953. The previous year, Nuffield had merged with Austin to form the British Motor Corporation, and the new management, headed by Leonard Lord axed the Oxford in favour of the Austin FX3, which had been launched in 1948. Beardmore Motors would go on to produce a cab of their own once more.

=== Manufactured ===
A total of 1,926 of all models were made.

	Ward End		Adderley Park
1947	362	1949–50	323
1947–48	331	1950–51	382
1948–49	234	1951–52	44
		1952–53	66

Distribution, sales and servicing were carried out by Beardmore Motors of Hendon. Beardmore, once a part of William Beardmore and Company had been taxi makers since 1919, but had ceased production of their last model before the outbreak of war.

== Revisions ==
Three models were produced, each a detail improvement of the previous. The Series I of 1947 had artillery wheels. The Series II, introduced in 1949 had pressed steel wheels and the Series III of 1950 had what was, in effect a six-light body, although of course the luggage platform had no door and thus no window.

== Wolseley ==
Note: The Oxford is known by many as a Wolseley model, as it was designed and first built at the Wolseley factory at Ward End. The manufacturer's name as recognised by the DVLA, and shown on some Road Fund Licence ('tax') discs and V5 registration documents is Nuffield. However, it should be understood that the DVLA is not authoritative on manufacturer names. The 1948 instruction manual for the Oxford Taxicab makes it clear that this was a Wolseley model, as does the manufacturer's plate under the bonnet.
