= Jones Brothers =

British coachbuilder

Jones Brothers was a British coachbuilding company that primarily manufactured taxi bodies, and produced bodies for luxury vehicles.

== History ==
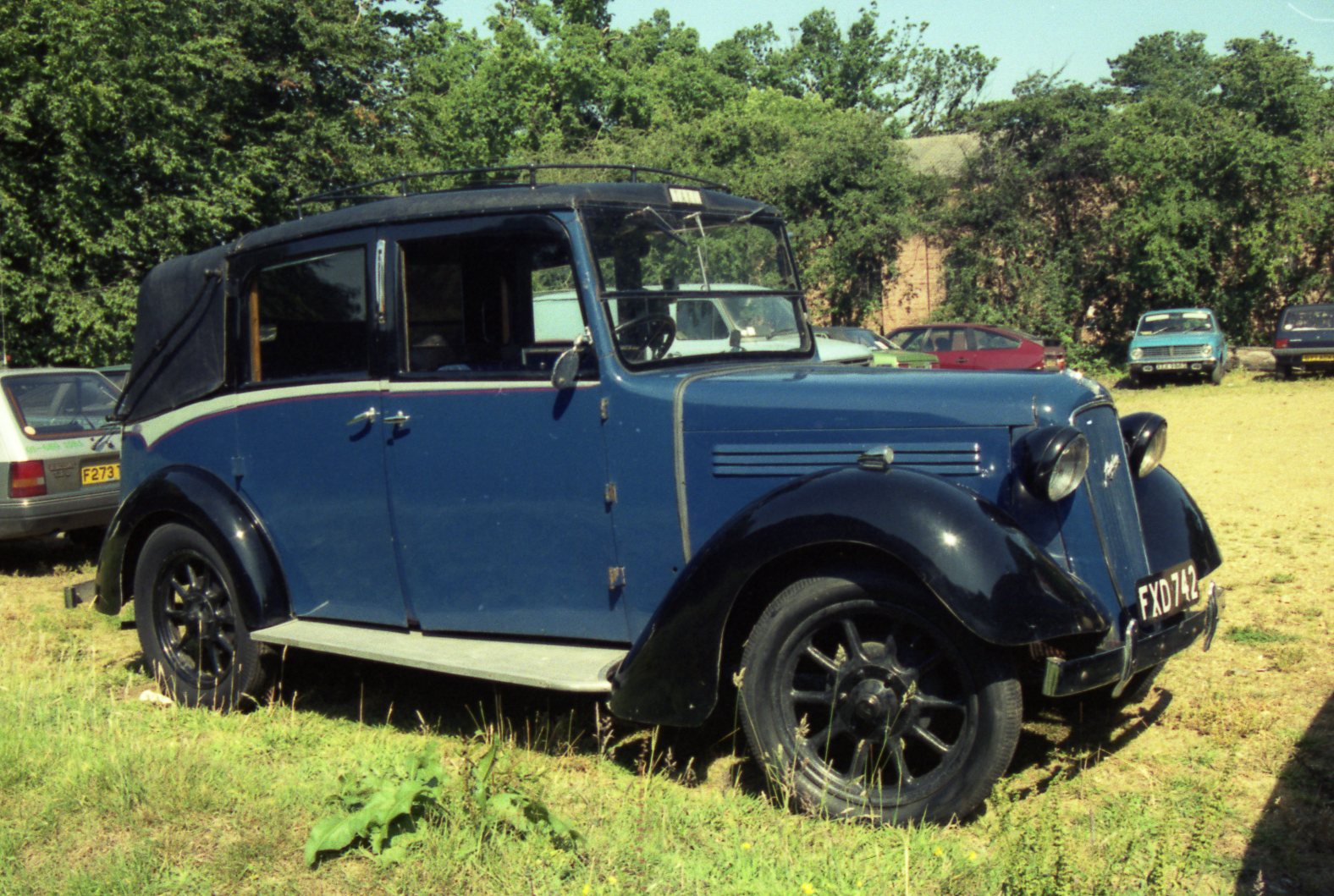
Austin 12/4 taxi with Jones Brothers body (1939)

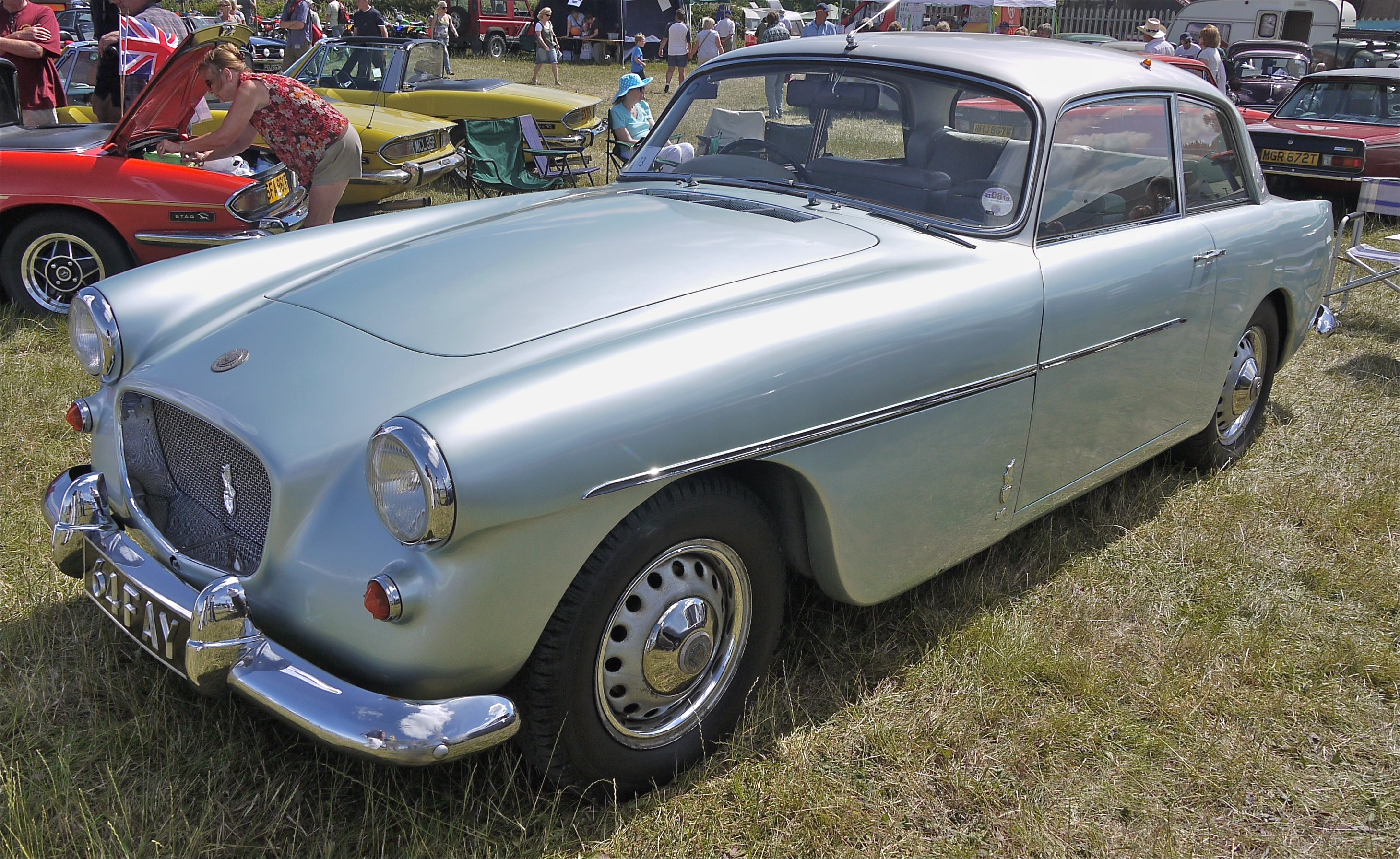
Jones Brothers manufactured most of the bodies for the Bristol 406

Jones began operations in 1928. The company was initially based in the London district of Bayswater. Jones began producing bodies for taxis early on. Chassis and engines initially came from the Austin 12 hp ("Heavy 12"), then from 1934 from the Austin 12/4. Mann & Overton took over distribution for the London area. In the mid-1930s, bodies for private vehicles were also added, such as a one-off aerodynamic two-door car built on the chassis of the Lanchester Ten or a small series of convertibles with Austin 12 mechanics, which were marketed as Sandringham.

After the Second World War, Jones was taken over by FH Boyd-Carpenter, who had operated his own coachbuilding business under the name Boyd-Carpenter until the outbreak of the war and now ran the Rumbold Company, a supplier to the aircraft industry. Boyd-Carpenter merged Jones' headquarters with that of the Rumbold Company in the London district of Willesden.

In the 1950s, Jones built Humber-based ambulances and pick-ups; some convertible versions of the Humber Super Snipe were also built at Jones. Jones may have acted as a subcontractor for Thrupp & Maberly, the preferred body supplier of the Rootes Group. Older vehicles were given new bodies on a one-off basis. One of these was a Bentley 3.5 Litre, which was given a "Woodie"-style station wagon body. The last order came from Bristol Cars and was for the manufacture of the bodies for the Bristol 406, introduced in 1958. Jones built around 150 406 bodies.

According to one source, Jones did not fully complete the Bristol contract; before it was completed, the company became insolvent and ceased operations. Bristol passed the wooden molds used by Jones on to Park Royal Vehicles in 1961, where – starting with the 407 – the bodies for the stylistically only slightly modified successors to the 406 were manufactured until 1976.

Another source reports that in 1962 Jones fitted a Jaguar Mark 2 with a station wagon body on behalf of racing driver Mike Hawthorn.

== Literature ==
- Nick Georgano: The Beaulieu Encyclopedia of the Automobile: Coachbuilding. Routledge, Boca Raton, Florida 2001, ISBN 978-1-136-60072-2.
- Nick Walker: A–Z of British Coachbuilders 1919–1960. Herridge & Sons, Beaworthy 2007, ISBN 978-0-9549981-6-5.
