= William Vincent Ltd. =

British coachbuilder

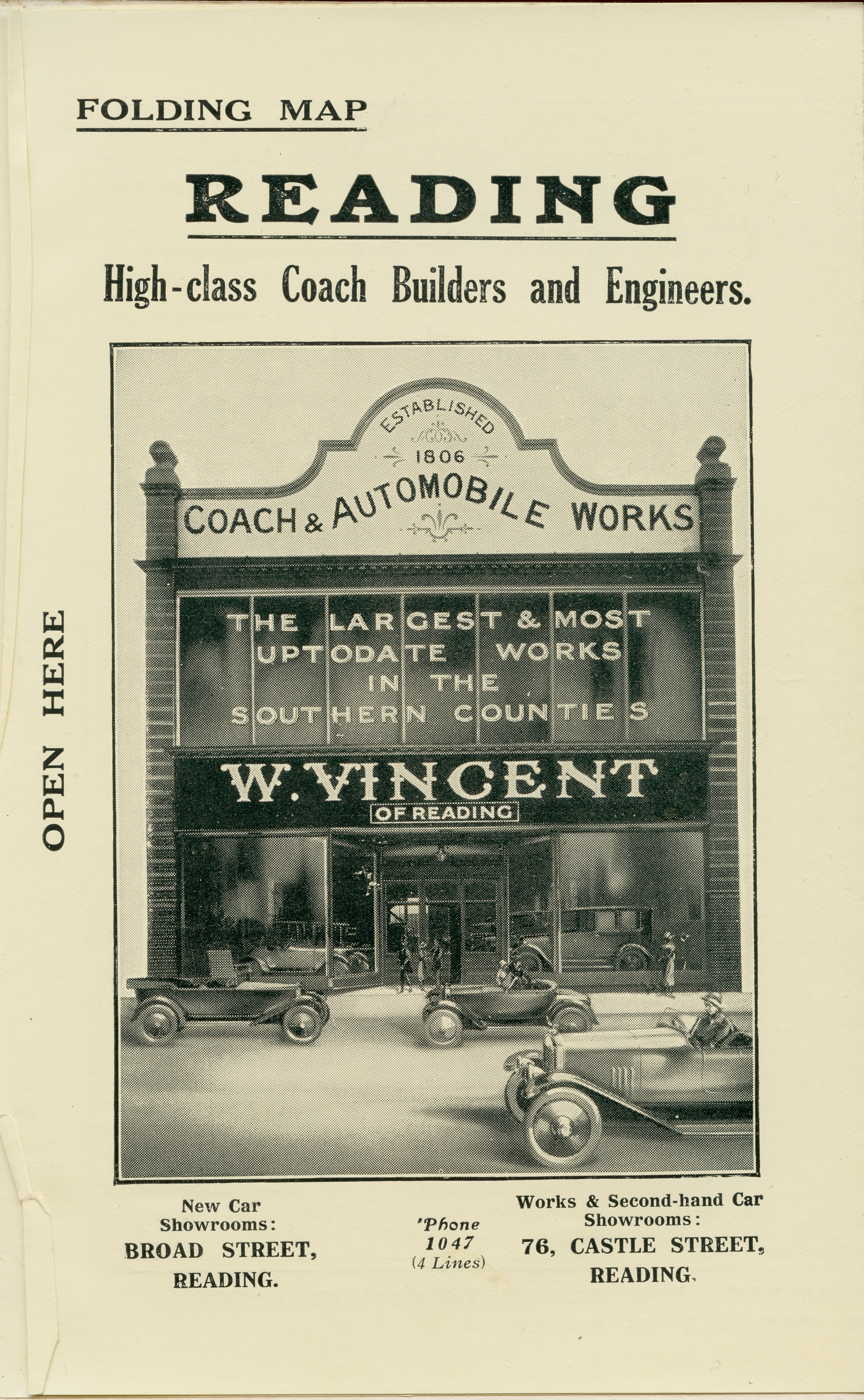
Advertisement for Vincents of Reading, 1920s

William Vincent Ltd., often known as Vincent of Reading, was a British coachbuilder founded in 1805 making carriages but in 1899 they made their first car body and later made bodies for commercial vehicles.

== Company history ==
The company, initially based in Arborfield, was founded in 1805 building horse-drawn carriages as well as agricultural equipment and railway carriages. They later moved to Castle Street, Reading.

The first car body was built in 1899 and seven years later in 1906 they supplied coachwork for a Rolls-Royce . In the 1920s Vincent claimed to have the "largest and most up-to-date works in the British Isles."

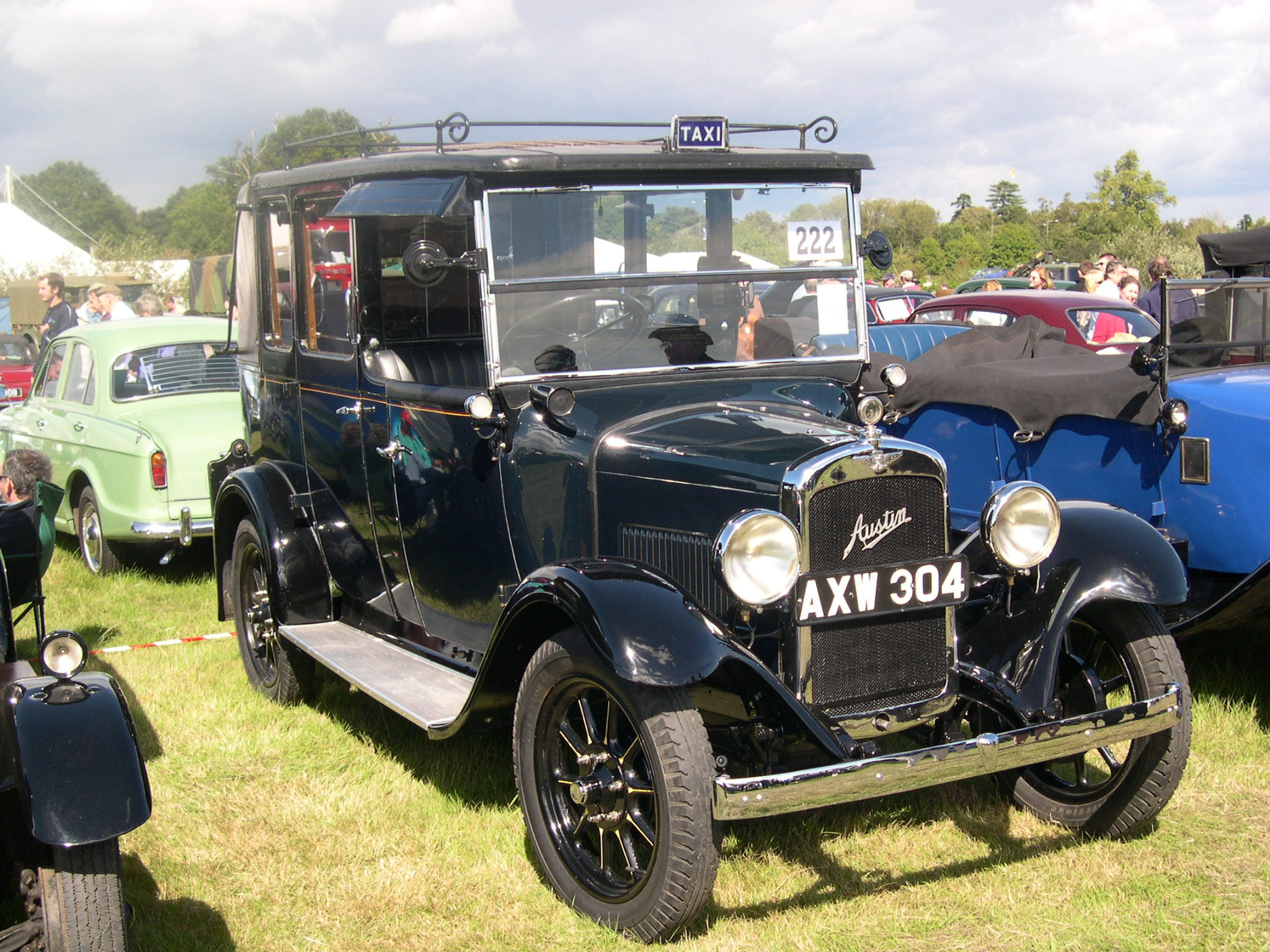
Austin 12-4 High Lot or Upright Grand by Vincent of Reading 1933

They exhibited at the London Motor Show from 1919 until 1935 making many bodies for Austin and Sunbeam. They became particularly noted however for their horseboxes making the first in 1912 for the Edwardian millionaire racehorse owner, Solomon Joel. Its bodies were particularly noted for their interiors with much use of inlaid woodwork.

When in the 1930s the demand for bespoke coachwork was declining Vincent turned increasingly to commercial vehicle work with horseboxes remaining a speciality.

During World War II the manufacturing site close to Reading station was used to make Spitfire parts.

After World War II the company exhibited again at the Motor Show with a Rolls-Royce displayed from 1948 to 1952. The last carbodies were made in the mid-1950s and the last horsebox in around 1981.

The firm was also an agent for Austin and Rolls-Royce and then BMW. They later became part of the Penta Group of car dealers.
