= Conditions of Fitness =

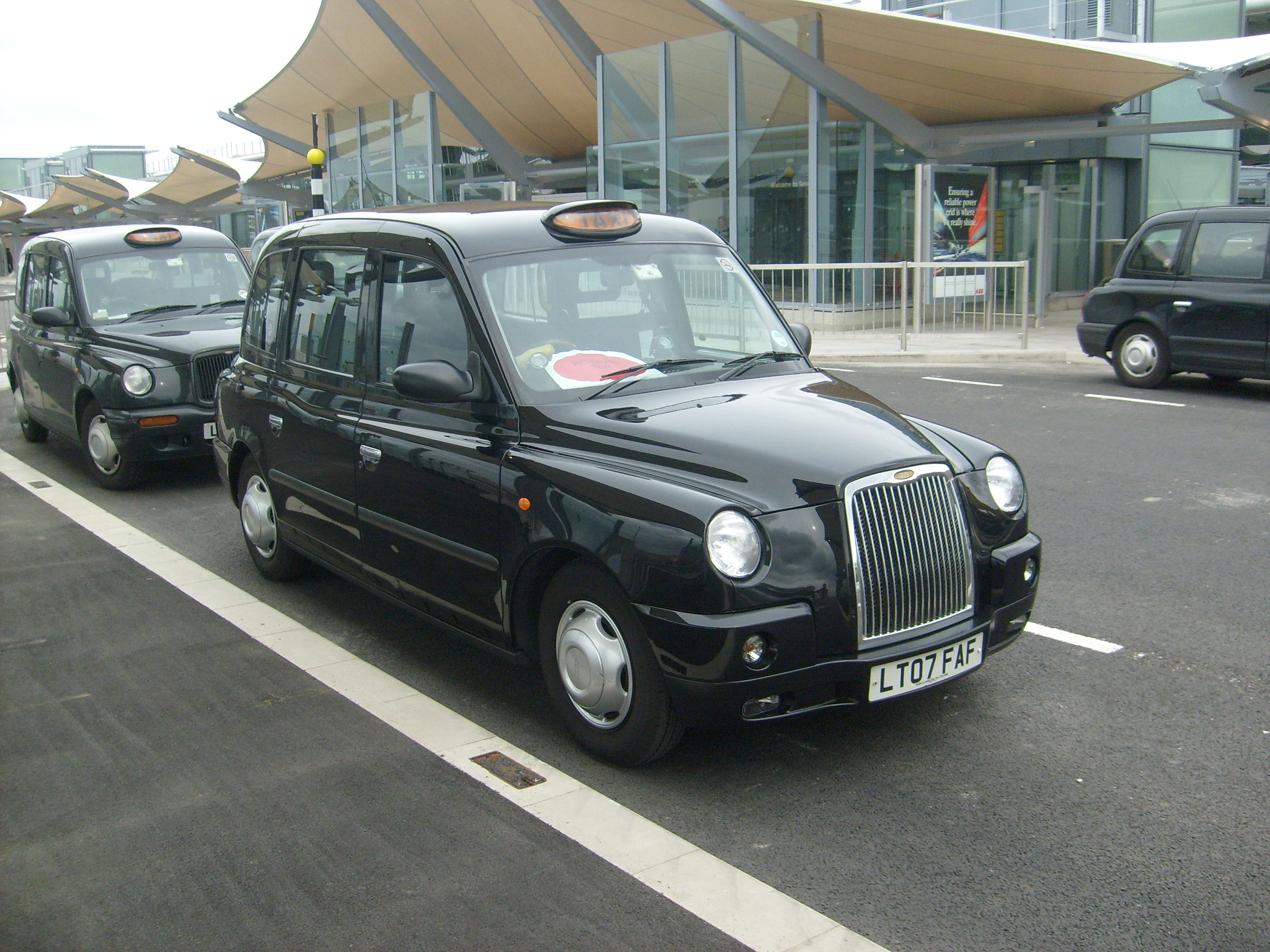
A London Taxi Company TX4 taxi, designed to conform with the Conditions of Fitness

The Metropolitan Conditions of Fitness for Taxis set out the requirements for vehicles that may be used as licensed Hackney carriage taxi cabs in London. They are what makes London's taxis unique in the world and are governed by Transport for London's Taxi and Private Hire office (formerly the Public Carriage office).

Rules governing London's horse cabs had been in existence in one form or another since the 17th century, but the first Conditions of Fitness specifically written for motor cabs were introduced in May 1906 by the then licensing authority, the Public Carriage Office, which was part of the Metropolitan Police. They were written under the guidance of W. Worby Beaumont, who was recommended to the Public Carriage Office by Lord Montagu of Beaulieu. As well as laying down the 25 ft (7.6 m) turning circle, they also demanded a 10-inch (25 cm) ground clearance. These regulations remained virtually unaltered until 1927, when they were reviewed, and the ground clearance relaxed to 7 inches (18 cm). A demand for the turning circle to be relaxed to 35 ft (11 m) was refused. The rules received minor changes to fit in with the changes in motor vehicle design, but a second major review was launched by the government after the turmoil surrounding the introduction of the minicab. The status quo was maintained, although the demand for a separate chassis was done away with.

From February 1989, all newly licensed black cabs were required to be able to take a passenger in a wheelchair.

In 2002, the Conditions of Fitness, or more specifically the turning circle, was challenged by a group of people who were adapting existing commercial vehicles into wheelchair accessible taxis for the provincial market. They wanted to enter the London market and argued that, with modern power steering the turning circle, which was a barrier to their entry was no longer necessary. The review found once more in favour of the status quo, but this decision was challenged by judicial review. After a protracted study, the PCO again found that the turning circle was essential to maintain mobility. The current conditions have been applicable since 1 January 2007.

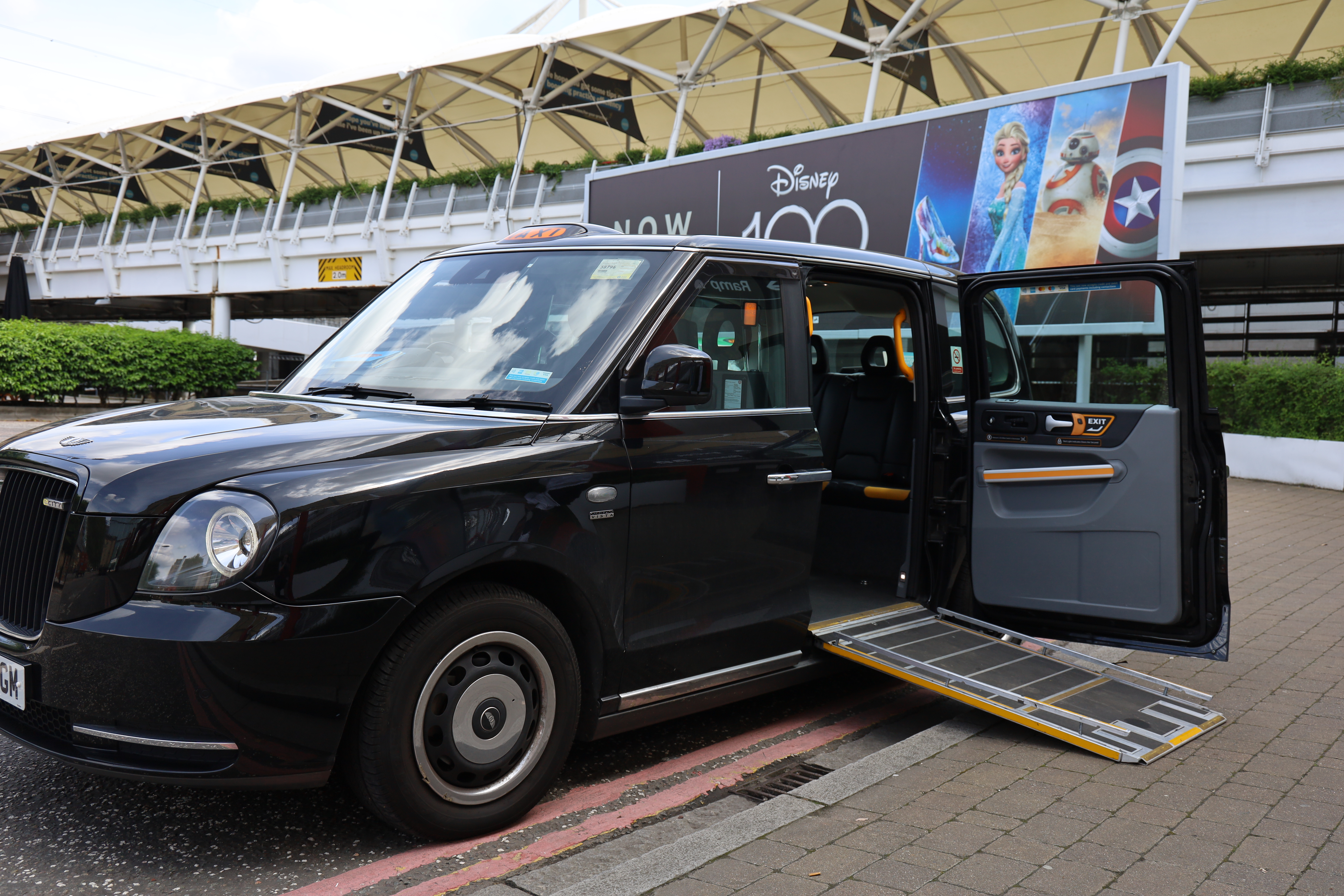
London Taxi with wheelchair ramp

The conditions require that all vehicles manufactured for use as licensed taxi cabs in London must be inspected for compliance with the standard before use. They regulate compliance with general UK and European vehicle standards and with specific design requirements including access to the vehicle, dimensions and layout, manoeuvrability, visibility and equipment.

Amongst the main requirements are the need for separate passenger and driver compartments, high internal headroom, a ramp for wheelchair user access and the ability to turn through 180° on either lock between two walls 8.535 m (28 ft) apart to minimise the impact of the many taxis operating in the city on other road users. (Note: In a 2005 study carried out when reviewing the turning circle requirement, Transport for London calculated that London cabs make 50 million U-turns and 90 million tight turns per year.)

As of 2008, two production vehicle models complied with the then-current conditions: the London Taxi Company TX4 and a specially-modified taxi variant of the Mercedes-Benz Vito with steerable rear wheels.
