= Triumph Vitesse =

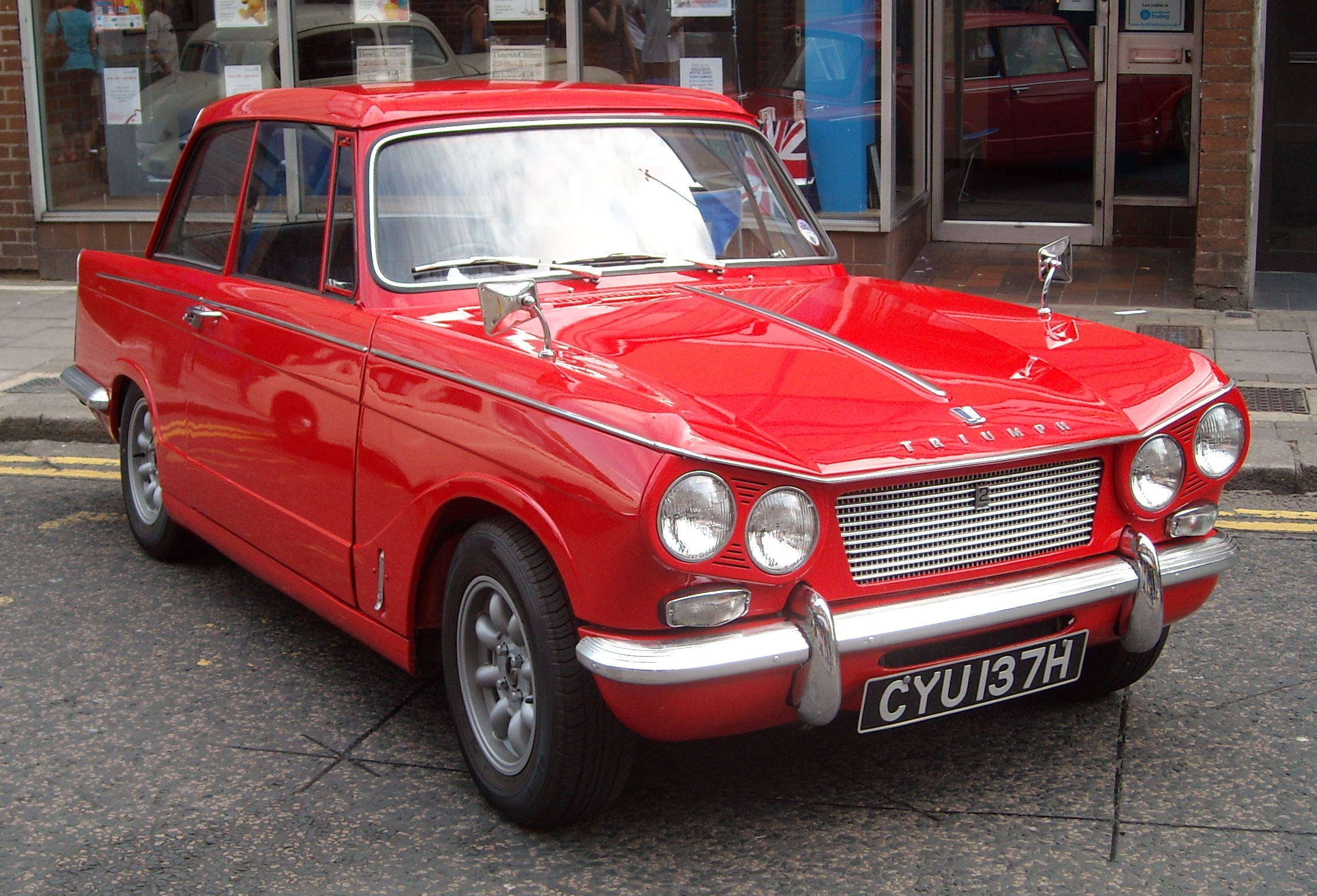

Overview
- Manufacturer: Standard-Triumph (1962–1968); British Leyland (1968–1971)
- Production: 1962–1971; 51,212 built
- Assembly: United Kingdom: Canley, Coventry
- Designer: Giovanni Michelotti

Body and chassis
- Body style: Two-door saloon Two-door convertible Three-door estate (by special order)
- Layout: FR layout
- Related: Triumph Herald; Triumph GT6

Powertrain
- Engine: 1596 cc Triumph I6; 1998 cc Triumph I6
- Transmission: Four-speed manual with Optional overdrive

Dimensions
- Wheelbase: 91.5 in (2,324 mm)
- Length: 153 in (3,886 mm)
- Width: 60 in (1,524 mm)
- Height: 52.5 in (1,334 mm)
- Kerb weight: 2,072 lb (940 kg)

Chronology
- Successor: Triumph Dolomite

The Triumph Vitesse is a compact six-cylinder car built by Standard-Triumph from 1962 to 1971. The car was based on the Giovanni Michelotti designed Herald and was available in saloon and convertible variants.

After the initial launch in 1962, the 2.0-litre was launched in 1966 and was improved in 1968 and was sold as the Mk2.

The Vitesse name was first used by Austin in the 1914 to 1916 Austin 20 hp and 30 hp Vitesse models. This was followed in 1922 by G. N.(Godfrey & Nash) on their GN Vitesse Cycle-car, and then by Triumph on a car made from 1935–1938.

After the last Triumph Vitesse was made in 1971, the Vitesse name remained unused until 1982 when Rover began to use the name on their more sporting models including the SD1, the 216, and finally on the Rover 800 until 1998.

== Vitesse 6 ==
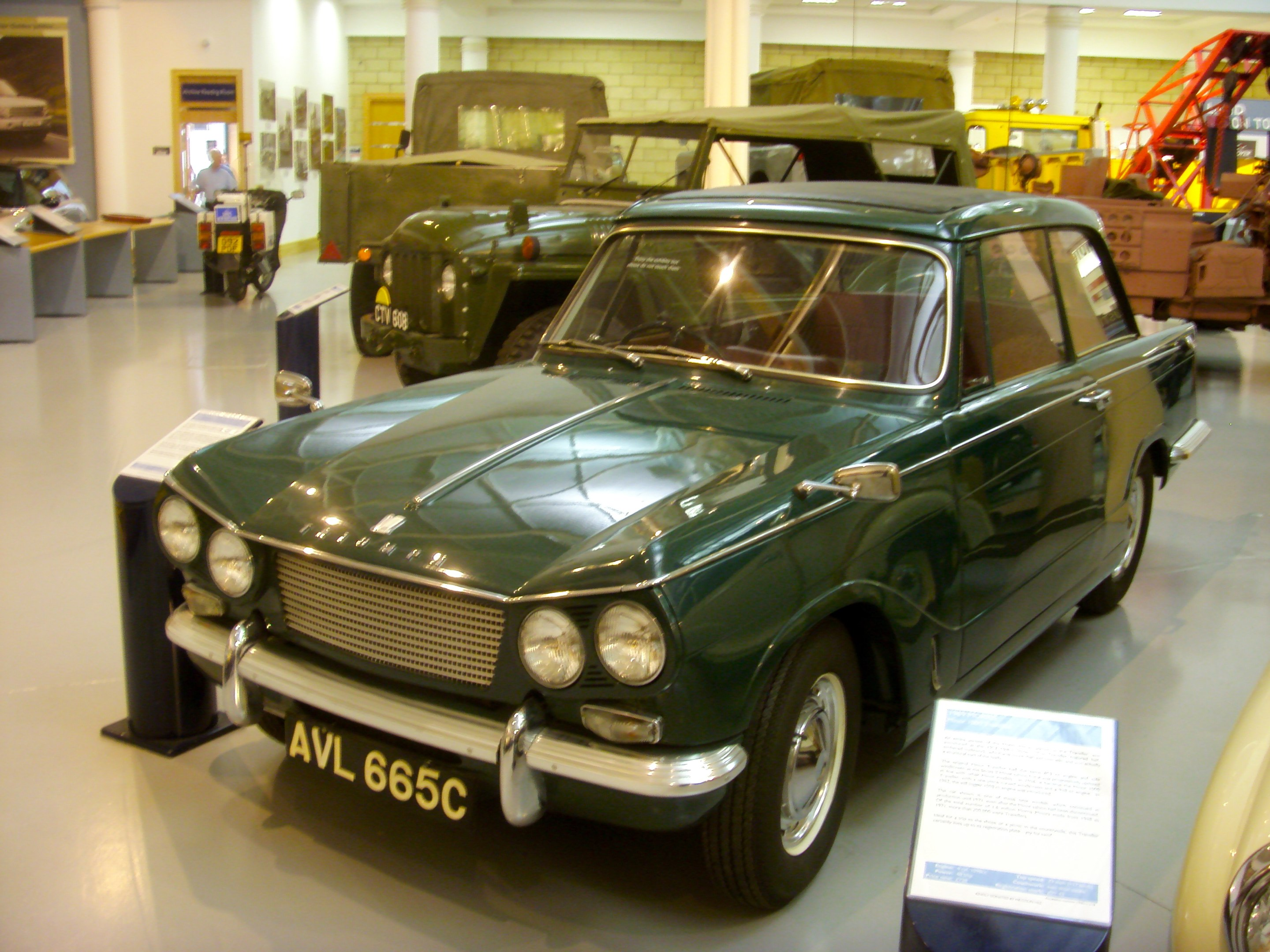
1965 Triumph Vitesse Saloon

The Triumph Vitesse was introduced on May 25, 1962, and reused a name previously used by the pre-Second World War Triumph Motor Company from 1936–38. The engine was an inline 6-cylinder performance version of the Triumph Herald small saloon. The Herald had been introduced in 1959 and was a 2-door car styled by the Italian designer Giovanni Michelotti. Within two years, Triumph began to give thought to a sports saloon based on the Herald and using their 6-cylinder engine. Michelotti was again approached for styling, and he came up with a car that used almost all body panels from the Herald, combined with a new front end with a slanted 4-headlamp design.

Standard-Triumph fitted a 1596 cc version of their traditional straight-6 derived from the engine used in the Standard Vanguard Six, but with a smaller bore diameter of 66.75 mm (2.628 in), compared with the 74.7 mm (2.94 in) bore on the Vanguard, equipped with twin Solex B32PIH semi-downdraught carburetors. These were soon replaced by B321H carburetors due to issues with accelerator pumps. A "seam" on the cylinder block between the third & fourth cylinders reveals the design beginnings of the 803cc Standard SC engine block, first used in the Standard Eight of 1953. The gearbox was strengthened and upgraded to closer (more sporting) gear ratios, and also offered with optional Laycock De Normanville 'D-type' overdrive with a 20% higher ratio for the top gear (the equivalent change from 3rd to 4th in a standard transmission), giving for more relaxed and economical cruising. Models fitted with overdrive had a chrome badge with "Overdrive" in italic text on the left side of the boot opposite the Vitesse 6 chrome script badge on the right. Synchromesh was present on 2nd, 3rd and 4th gears.

The rear axle was changed to a slightly uprated differential, but retaining the same 4.11:1 ratio and flange sizes as the Herald. Front disc brakes were standard as were larger rear brake drums, and the Herald fuel tank was enlarged, retaining the reserve feature (essentially a curved pickup pipe that could be rotated to dip into the last few centimeters of fuel) of the smaller Herald tank. The front suspension featured uprated springs to cope with the extra weight of the new engine, while the rear suspension, a swing-axle transverse-leaf system, was mostly unchanged from the Herald. The chassis looked outwardly similar to the early Heralds, but in fact was substantially re-designed and strengthened, especially around the differential mountings, improvements which were immediately passed through to Herald production. The dash and instrument panel of the earliest Vitesse was the same as the Herald, with a single speedometer dial featuring fuel and temperature gauge insets. The Vitesse was available in convertibles and saloon forms; a coupé never got beyond the prototype stage. The separate chassis construction of the car meant that no additional strengthening to chassis or body was considered necessary for the convertible model, the only concession being additional door catches to prevent the doors opening during hard cornering.

While not an official derivative of the Vitesse, about a dozen estates were assembled to special order at Standard-Triumph's Service Depot at Park Royal in West London.

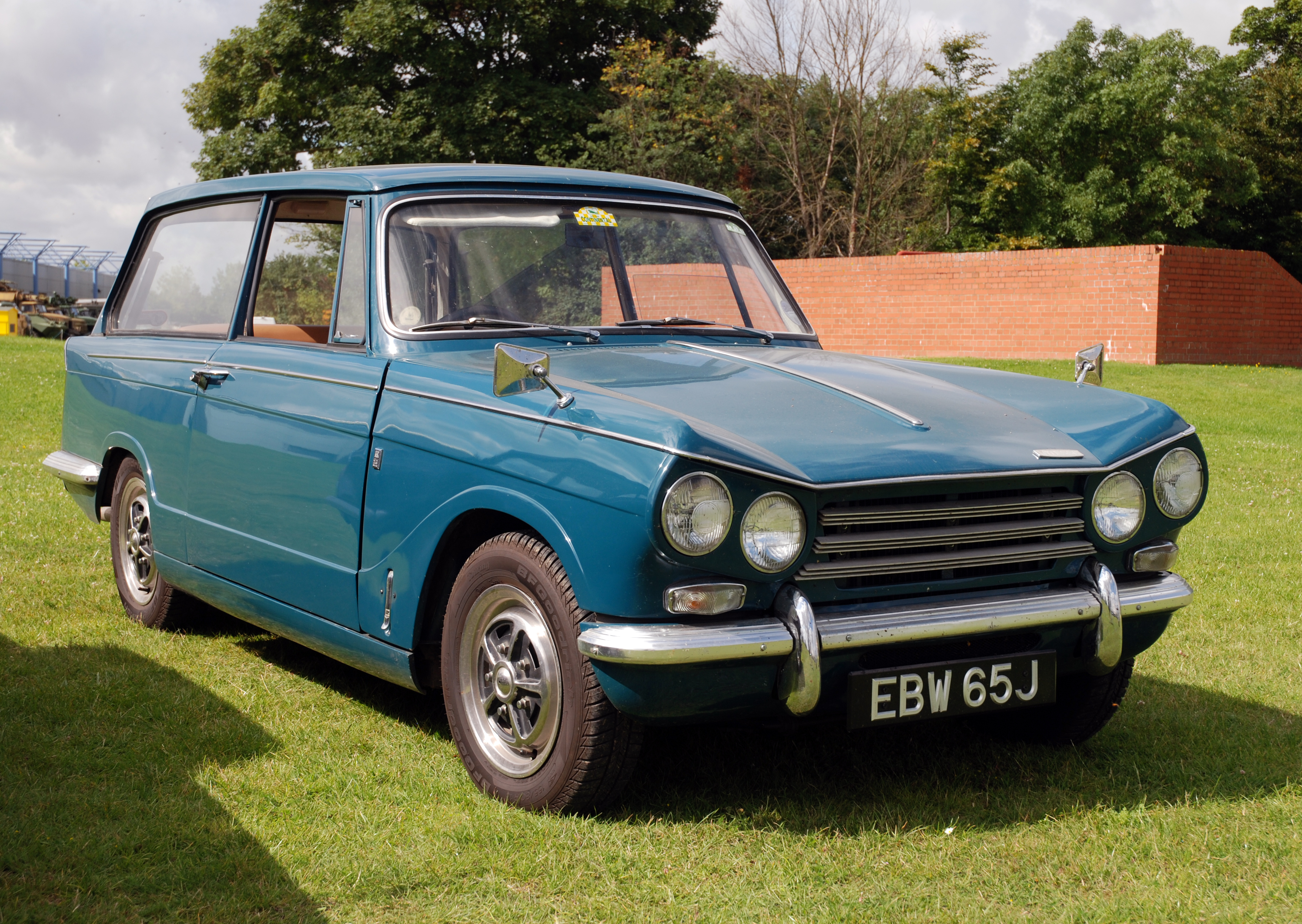
Triumph Vitesse 3-door estate

The Vitesse received a more luxurious interior compared to the Herald; wooden door capping were added to match the wooden dashboard and the car featured slightly better seats and door trims. Optional extras included a vinyl/fabric 'Britax Weathershield' sunroof on saloon models. Exterior trim was also improved with an elongated stainless steel trim piece which extended further down the body than the Herald, including a Vitesse specific piece of trim rearward of the petrol filler cap and satin-silver anodized alloy bumper capping replacing the white rubber Herald items.

In September 1963 the Vitesse received its first facelift, when the dashboard was revised with a full range of Smith instruments instead of the large single dial from the Herald (large speedometer and cable driven tachometer flanked by smaller 2 inch fuel and temperature gauges). From September 1965, at commission number HB27986, the twin Solex carburettors were replaced by twin Stromberg CD 150 carburetors. Power output increased from the original 70 bhp (52 kW) at 5,000 rpm and torque of 92.5 lb⋅ft (125 N⋅m). There was a claimed increase of 13–14 bhp, and the motoring magazine tested top speed rose to 91 mph (146 km/h), with the 0–80 mph (0–129 km/h) time decreasing from 46.6 seconds to 33.6 seconds.

The Vitesse 6 sold extremely well for Triumph, proving to be the most popular Vitesse sold during the model's lifetime. The car received initial praise for its performance, fuel economy, interior and tight turning circle.

== Sports 6 ==
The Vitesse 6 convertible was exported to the US as the left-hand drive Triumph Sports 6 from 1962 until 1964. Original US price (POE East Coast) was $2,499, and it was offered in White, Signal Red or Black. The Vitesse Saloon was never officially imported to the US. Due to its high retail price and competition from cars such as Ford's new Mustang, only 679 were sold before it was withdrawn from the market.

== Vitesse 2-Litre ==
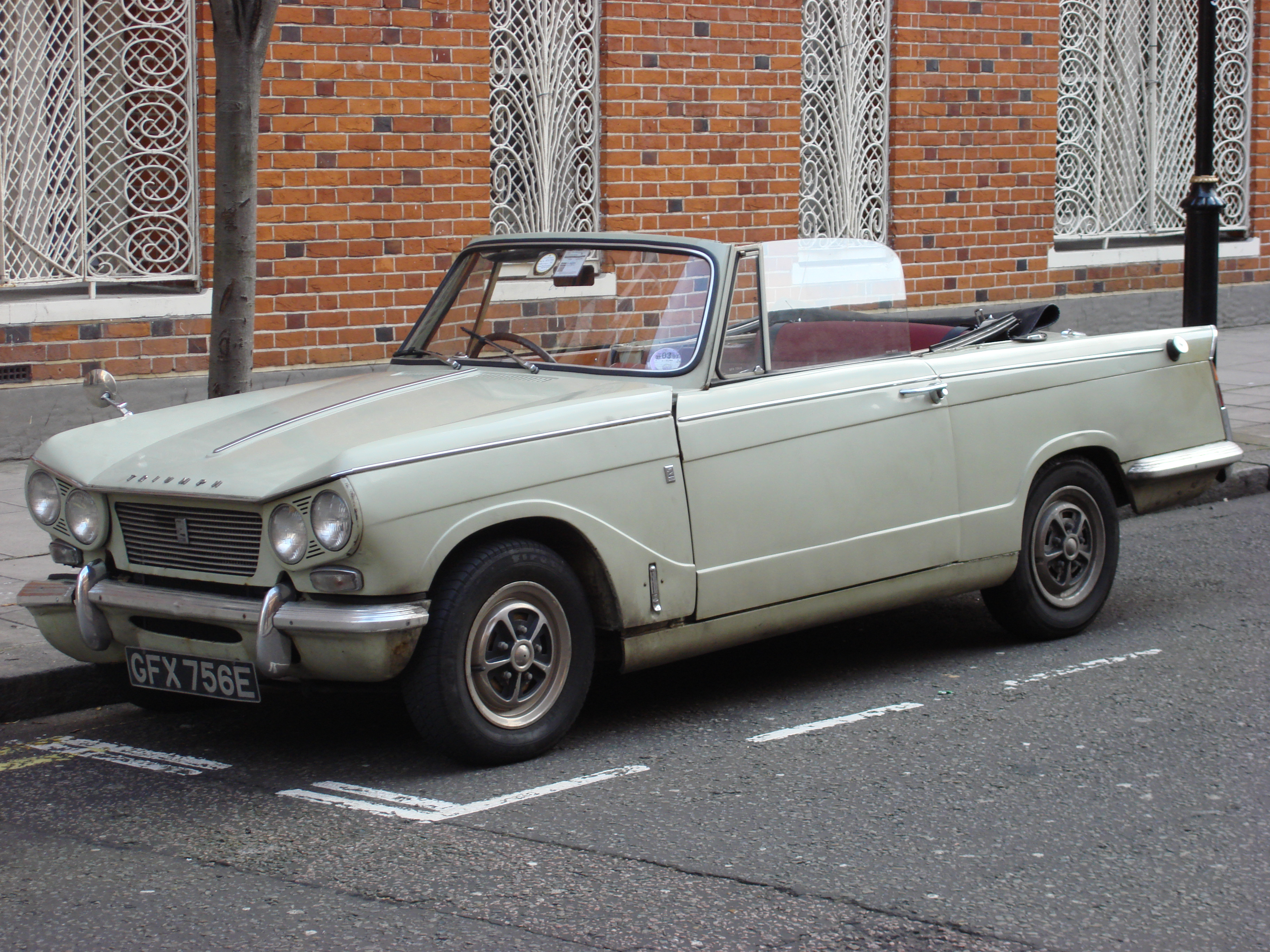
A 1967 Cactus Green Triumph Vitesse 2-Litre convertible (although fitted with mock rostyle wheel trims only introduced on the Mk2; the original 2 litre had hubcaps)

In September 1966, Triumph upgraded the engine to 1998cc, in line with the new Triumph GT6 coupé, and relaunched the Vitesse as the Vitesse 2-Litre. Power was increased to 95 bhp (71 kW), endowing the new car with a claimed 0–60 mph time of just under 12 seconds, and lifting top speed to 104 mph (167 km/h). (The 2-Litre was advertised by Triumph as "The Two Seater Beater"). Other detail modifications for the 2-litre included a stronger clutch, all synchromesh gearbox, larger front brakes, and a stronger differential with a slightly higher 3.89:1 ratio. Wider & stronger 4.5-inch wheel rims were fitted, but radial-ply tyres were still optional at extra cost. There was a satin silver anodized aluminium-alloy cowling above the new reversing light, and badges on the side of the bonnet and in the centre of the grille read 2 litre. The Vitesse boot badge was retained as italic script but lost the 6 of the earlier model - replacing that with the rectangular 2 litre badge and with a chrome strip underlining the Vitesse badge. Cars with overdrive had a separate badge on the cowling above the number plate/reversing light. Inside the car, the seats were improved, with softer (more plush) covering and a better back-rest shape which slightly improved rear-seat knee-room. A new leather-covered three-spoke steering wheel was also added. The Vitesse Mk I was sold until 1968.

== Vitesse Mk II ==
The Vitesse Mark 2 was launched in October 1968 as the final update to the Vitesse range. For the Mark 2, Triumph focused on improvements to the rear suspension by fitting new lower wishbones and Rotoflex half-shaft couplings. This system, also shared with the new GT6 MKII (GT6+ in the US market), and the first GT6 MkIIIs, improved higher speed handing and roadholding. The solid swing axles of the Herald and earlier Vitesses had camber changes of some 15 degrees from the limits of travel. By adding the lower wishbone and the divided drive shaft whilst retaining the transverse leaf spring as the top link, this camber change was reduced to about 5 degrees.

There were other improvements: the engine was tweaked once more to provide 104 bhp (78 kW), cutting the 0–60 mph time to just over 11 seconds and providing a top speed of over 100 mph (160 km/h). The main changes were to the valve timing, to give earlier opening and later closing of the inlet valves compared with the earlier 2-litre engine. (38/78 btdc/atdc for the Mk2 vs 30/60 for the 2 litre). Design changes to the cylinder head allowed for increased inlet valve diameters and better porting. Another major difference in the cylinder head removed the "step" in earlier 1600 and 2 litre incarnations. This meant that in the earlier cars the head studs on the right (manifold) side were short and ended under the manifolds, necessitating unbolting the (hot) manifolds and dropping them back to retorque the studs after a head gasket replacement. The MKII head was full width so all the studs were accessible. The inlet manifolds of the MkII were shorter than the 2 litre to keep inlet tract length the same. The Stromberg carburetors were also changed from 150 CD to 150 CDS, the S referring to the use of a spring between the dashpot cover and piston.

The exterior featured a new grille with 3 sets of horizontal elements that were also used (in longer form) in the Herald 13/60, Rostyle wheel trims and silver painted steel rear panel (described by Triumph as "ceramic"). The interior was upgraded once more in order to share parts with the new Herald 13/60, though the Vitesse included a tachometer and larger ashtray. A new colour range was offered for the Mark 2 models. The aluminium cowling above the reversing light gained an oblong chromed VITESSE badge, and the separate chromed Mazak TRIUMPH letters on the bonnet and the boot lid were also deleted. The badges on the bonnet sides were changed to read Mk2 instead of 2 litre. Cars with overdrive had a small badge that fitted below the new rectangular Triumph boot badge.

The Vitesse continued to sell well until its discontinuation in July 1971, seven months before being replaced by the Triumph Dolomite.

== Production figures ==
- Vitesse 6 (1600): May 1962 – September 1966; 31,261
  - saloon: 22,814
  - convertible: 8,447, includes 679 Sports 6 (USA)
- Vitesse 2-Litre: September 1966 – September 1968; 10,830

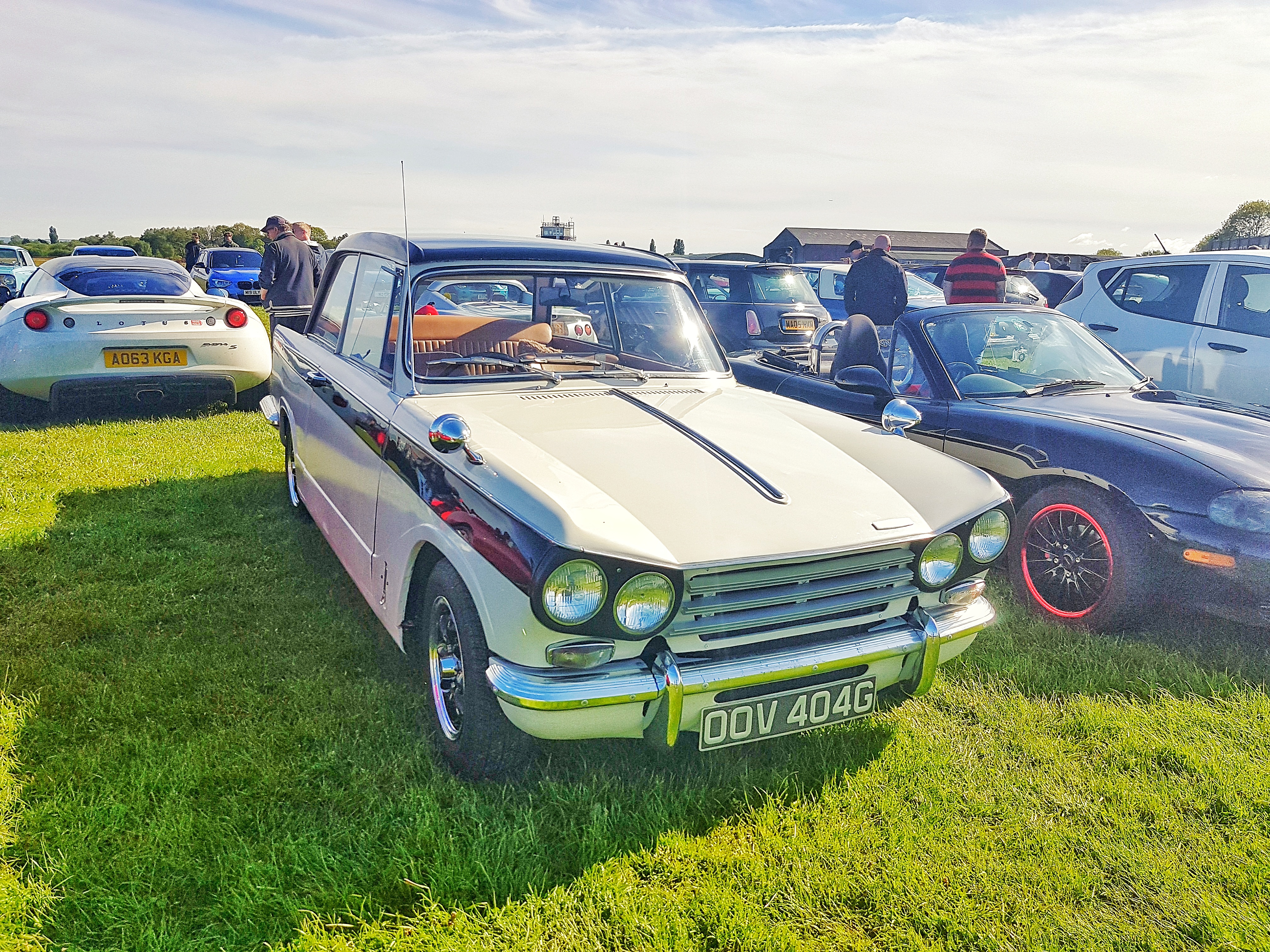
Triumph Vitesse

  - saloon: 7,328
  - convertible: 3,502
- Vitesse Mk II: July 1968 – July 1971; 9,121
  - saloon: 5,649
  - convertible: 3,472
