= Austin 15/20 =

British car model of 1906

Austin 15-20

Overview
- Manufacturer: Austin Motor Company
- Also called: Austin 15-20 hp
- Production: 1906
- Assembly: Longbridge plant, Birmingham

Powertrain
- Engine: 4,399 cc (268.4 cu in) 4-cylinder
- Transmission: four-speed gearbox

Dimensions
- Wheelbase: 2,972 mm (117.0 in)four-speed gearbox
- Kerb weight: 864 kg (1,905 lb)four-speed gearbox

Chronology
- Predecessor: None

The Austin 15-20 (or 15-20 hp) is the smaller-engined of the almost identical pair of new cars announced by Herbert Austin in February 1906. A very complete catalogue with detailed specifications was issued at the same time. As well as the engine's smaller bore the 15-20 differed from the 25-30 by being only available with a live rear axle and not chain-drive. Otherwise the specifications were the same, the very minor differences are detailed below.

Only four cars were manufactured. It was replaced by the 18-24 in 1907.

== Engine ==
The engine has four separately cast vertical cylinders with interchangeable inlet and exhaust valves, five bearings to the crankshaft, an independent casting for the crank-chamber and easily removable camshafts.

Absolute synchronism has been enabled for the combustion cycle. The valve-gear and the ignition gear for the low tension igniters are adjustable and the lift of the valves and the firing moment of each igniter may be adjusted while the engine is running.

A circulating pump constantly lubricates all moving parts except the pistons which are fed separately from a fitting on the dashboard.

An automatic governor connected to the throttle valve, a small hand-lever above the steering wheel and the accelerator pedal allows the maintenance of any desired speed.

At the normal running speed of 900 rpm this engine develops 22 bhp. The 15-20 is provided with a 12-gallon rather than 15-gallon fuel tank and slightly smaller tyres are fitted.

== Transmission ==
The main clutch is multiple-disc type with metal to metal friction surfaces running in oil. The change-speed gear is designed on "Mercedes" lines using ball-bearings and it provides four forward speeds. Each shaft has three bearings. The sliding portion of the mechanism is enclosed. There is no joint that can leak.

The live axles are connected to the mainframe by a torque-rod as well as by radius-rods. The live shafts inside the back axle take none of the weight of the car.

All road wheels have ball-bearings.

== Chassis frame ==
The frame is pressed steel, narrowed at the front, raised at the rear to clear the axle. Its side members are formed of one piece with the under-frame carrying engine and gear-box.

== Brakes suspension steering ==
All road wheels as well as the easily adjusted steering gear and the steering-heads have ball bearings. There is no mention of suspension or braking systems. The omission of a mention of brakes was remedied in the advertisement displayed below – there was a pedal-operated brake on the countershaft and a hand-operated lever on internal-acting brakes on the back wheels.
