= Austin 20 hp =

Overview
- Manufacturer: Austin
- Production: 1913 – 1919
- Assembly: Longbridge Works, Northfield, Birmingham

Body and chassis
- Class: large family car, premium quality
- Body style: open tourer; landaulette; chassis for bespoke body
- Layout: front engine rear wheel drive

Powertrain
- Engine: 1913: 3160 cc vertical inline four cylinder; June 1914: 3610 cc vertical inline four cylinder
- Transmission: 4-speeds and reverse, clutch to elliptic sprung back axle all conventional Austin design

Dimensions
- Wheelbase: 1913: 112 in (2,844.8 mm); 116 in (2,946.4 mm); 120 in (3,048.0 mm); 1914: 118 in (2,997.2 mm); 126 in (3,200.4 mm); 129 in (3,276.6 mm) track; 54 in (1,371.6 mm)
- Length: not reported; 165 in (4,191.0 mm)

Chronology
- Predecessor: none
- Successor: Austin Twenty

20 horsepower

Layout
- Displacement: 3,160 cc (193 cu in); 3,610 cc (220 cu in)
- Cylinder bore: 89 mm (3.5 in); 95 mm (3.7 in)
- Piston stroke: 127 mm (5.0 in)
- Valvetrain: T-head side valve with twin camshafts

Combustion
- Fuel system: carburettor not reported; Claudel carburettor
- Fuel type: petrol
- Oil system: pressure
- Cooling system: water

Output
- Power output: 1913: not reported Tax horsepower 19.64; 1914: 55 bhp (41 kW; 56 PS) @2,250 rpm Tax horsepower 22.38

The Austin 20-hp is a mid-sized car premium quality that was made by British manufacturer Austin and first displayed as a chassis in Paris in December 1912, advertised in March 1913 and shown to the public as a complete car at the Olympia Motor Show in November 1913. At that time both the 20 and the 30 were regarded as new models.

While at first glance it may have seemed to take the place within Austin's range of their 18-24 car which was really a 30-40 hp, its engine was just two-thirds of the size of the old car. The new car was not an enlarged 15 but a scaled-down 30. In its introduction and publicity it was always downplayed apparently to contrast with the more powerful Austin 30 hp.

It was the only Austin car in production through the war though in limited quantity.

== 1913 ==
=== Pricing ===
A clearer presentation of how Austin fitted this car into its catalogue is given by 1913 pricing:

four-cylinder

10 hp £260
15 hp £340
20 hp £375

18-24 hp £480 (made obsolete by the new 30 hp)

30 hp £550

six-cylinder

50 hp £650

=== Bodies ===
The body displayed at the 1913 Olympia Motor Show was a six or seven seater landaulette. Fitted as standard with a dynamo electric lighting system it cost £675.

Landaulette

Display advertising in the Manchester Guardian under the heading Comfort Carriages described this Marlborough landaulette as smart enough for the most fashionable, accommodating six people including the driver, with Austin detachable steel wheels, Dunlop tyres, electric lighting, ventilator in roof and two emergency seats. In addition a horn was supplied and a kit of tools. Coachwork and trim colour to owner's selection. Quick delivery can be made, price £693.

Phaeton

The 20 hp Vitesse Phaeton was pictured in the same newspaper. It came with a waterproof canvas hood, double-folding windscreen, grooved and studded tyres, detachable wheels (with spare and studded tyre), dynamo lighting system with all lamps, speedometer, lifting jack, tyre pump and levers, horn and kit of tools. Painted and trimmed to client's own colour selection £596:10:0

=== Mechanicals ===
The 20-hp retained the by now rare engine design of its predecessors having separately cast cylinders. The engine's 3½ inch cylinder bore pistons came from the 15-hp car and the longer stroke or crankshaft and connecting rods, from the 18-24. The other chassis dimensions were very close to those of the 18–24. The gearbox was an improved rendition of that for the old 15 hp car. Otherwise it was believed the chassis called for no special comment being an example of sound and orthodox design except for the rear suspension. The Austin patent full elliptic rear springs are almost unique among English cars. However the high standard of workmanship and finish in the engine and the whole finely turned out chassis was noted by The Times.

== Trial ==
The car presented for trial was a standard open 5-passenger machine. It was taken out to High Wycombe and Prince's Risborough then over Kop Hill back to London. A strong head wind kept the speed down to 40 mph but on the return a 50 mph pace was easily set and maintained. It is a moderate size of engine but it runs remarkably smoothly and with elasticity. Many other engines of a similar size give greater power but the Austin is serene in its work. The throttle had to be kept wide open to achieve the desired performance and while pick-up and acceleration were good perhaps another form of carburettor might give a great improvement. It is not a fast car on the level or hill-climbing. Kop Hill was climbed with little effort but first gear was required about one hundred yards from the summit.

Gear change is smooth and easy, brakes and suspension are excellent, the engine runs without noise and vibration. The reviewer described it as "a common-sense motor-car". The price of the chassis is £375. Using a catchphrase of the day—it wouldn't pull the skin off a rice pudding.

== 1914 ==
=== Revision ===
A few days after that road-test was published The Autocar announced "The New 20 h.p. Austin", on 6 June 1914. Much more information is held but it contains conflicting data and details are yet to be clarified.

=== Sports type ===
From June 1914 a variant was available known as the 20 hp sports type. The major difference was that the engine bore is increased to 95 mm. Pistons and connecting rods are lightened and the valves were given a higher lift camshaft. The steering column was given more rake to allow for a lower seating position.

== 1915 ==
=== Gas and coolant flows ===
In November 1915 both the valves and the induction manifold were enlarged. The factory claimed for this a marked increase in power saying their regular test hill with a maximum gradient of one in six previously required the use of third gear but could now be climbed unfaltering on top gear. There had been no change in gear ratios. The radiator was enlarged and each water jacket beside the exhaust valve port was now separately fed by a large diameter external lead direct from the water pump.

=== Instruments and controls ===
Other improvements announced in November 1915 included the fitting of a new instrument board, relocation of the steering column, provision of new-shaped pedals with an improved kind of accelerator pedal. An improved clutch coupling was fitted.

== Successor ==
Austin Twenty intended for mass production (25,000 cars per year) announced 1919
