= Austin Twenty =

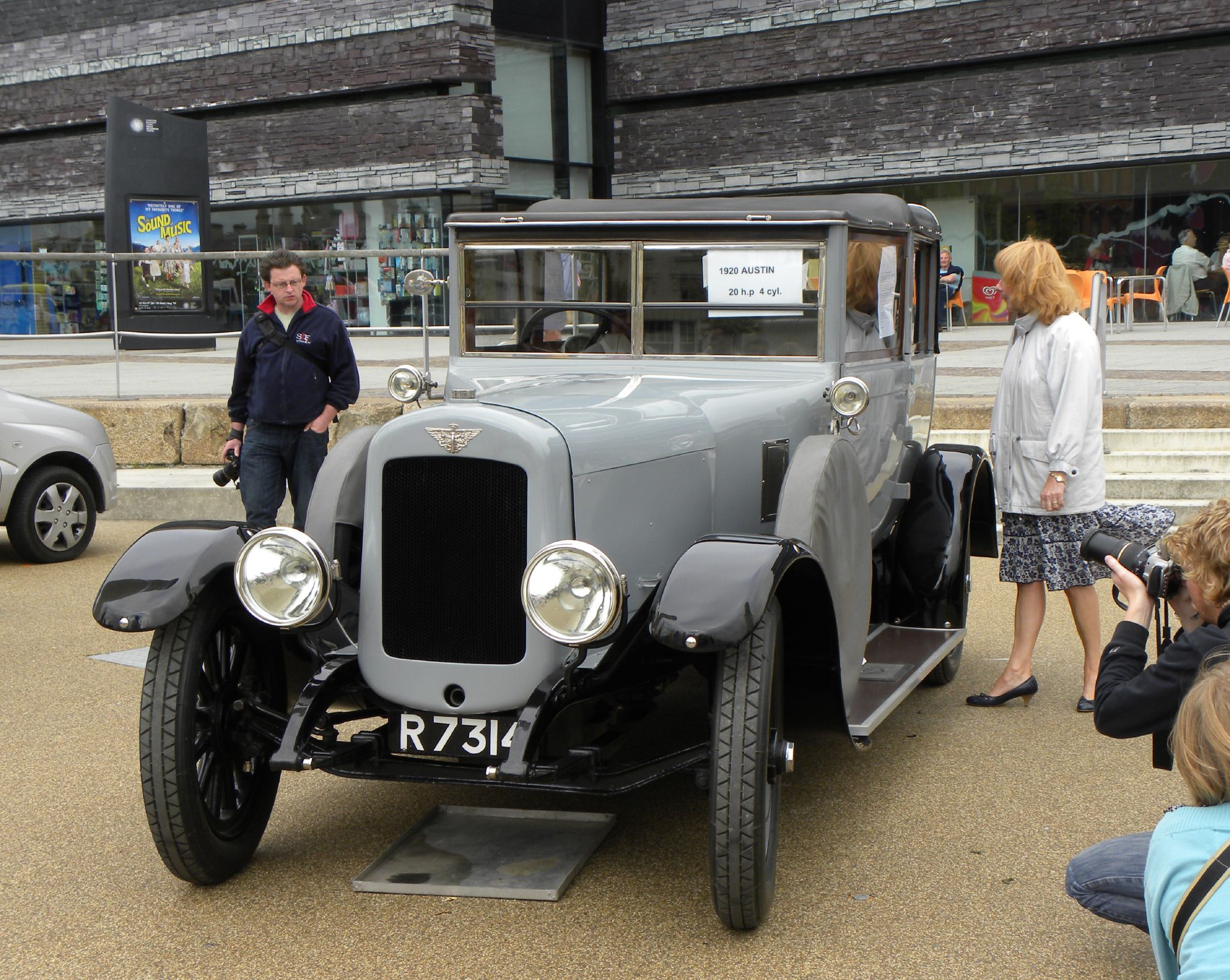
- Twenty Allweather coupé 1919

Overview
- Manufacturer: Austin
- Also called: Austin 20/4 (from 1927)
- Production: April 1919–1930; 15,287 produced
- Assembly: Longbridge plant, Birmingham

Body and chassis
- Body style: saloon, tourer, coupé, landaulette 16-cwt light van

Powertrain
- Engine: 3,610 cc (220 cu in) Straight-4
- Transmission: Single-plate clutch; four-speed gearbox; propeller shaft to rear axle with helical-bevel gearing

Dimensions
- Wheelbase: 130 in (3,300 mm)
- Length: 188 in (4,800 mm)
- Width: 69 in (1,800 mm)
- Kerb weight: 1020 kg

Chronology
- Predecessor: Austin 20
- Successor: Austin 20/6

Austin Twenty engine 4

Overview
- Manufacturer: Austin
- Production: April 1919–1929

Layout
- Configuration: Straight 4-cylinder
- Displacement: 3,610 cc (220 cu in)
- Cylinder bore: 95 mm (3.7 in)
- Piston stroke: 127 mm (5.0 in)
- Cylinder block material: Cast iron, alloy crankcase
- Cylinder head material: Detachable

Combustion
- Fuel system: Ignition by magneto
- Fuel type: Petrol
- Oil system: Lubrication by forced feed
- Cooling system: Cooling water is pump-circulated

Output
- Power output: 45 bhp (34 kW; 46 PS) @2,000 rpm Tax horsepower 22.38

Chronology
- Successor: Austin 20/6

Austin Twenty is a large car introduced by Austin after the end of the First World War in April 1919, and continued in production until 1930. After the Austin 20/6 model was introduced in 1927, the first model was referred to as the Austin 20/4.

Before 1919, Austins had been expensive, prestige cars. If the coachwork were light enough, the Twenty could also give a three-litre Bentley a run for its money. The final inter-war version was the side-valve Twenty-Eight of 1939. The overhead-valve (25) Sheerline and its Princess companion were to continue the line after the Second World War; however, by the 1930s Austin had lost its aristocratic cachet, having become well known for its Twelves and Sevens.

The four-cylinder Twenty found fame at Brooklands both in private hands and with works drivers Lou Kings and Arthur Waite (Herbert Austin's Australian son-in-law and competitions manager).

== One model policy ==
Before the First World War, Austin had produced a range of expensive cars, including a 3.6-litre 20 hp car but, influenced by the manufacturing philosophy of Henry Ford, Herbert Austin decided that the future was in mass-producing a single model, and chose the 20 hp class. The Longbridge plant had been considerably enlarged for wartime production, and it was there that the company had a base to put the theory into practice now with the capacity to manufacture 150 cars a week.

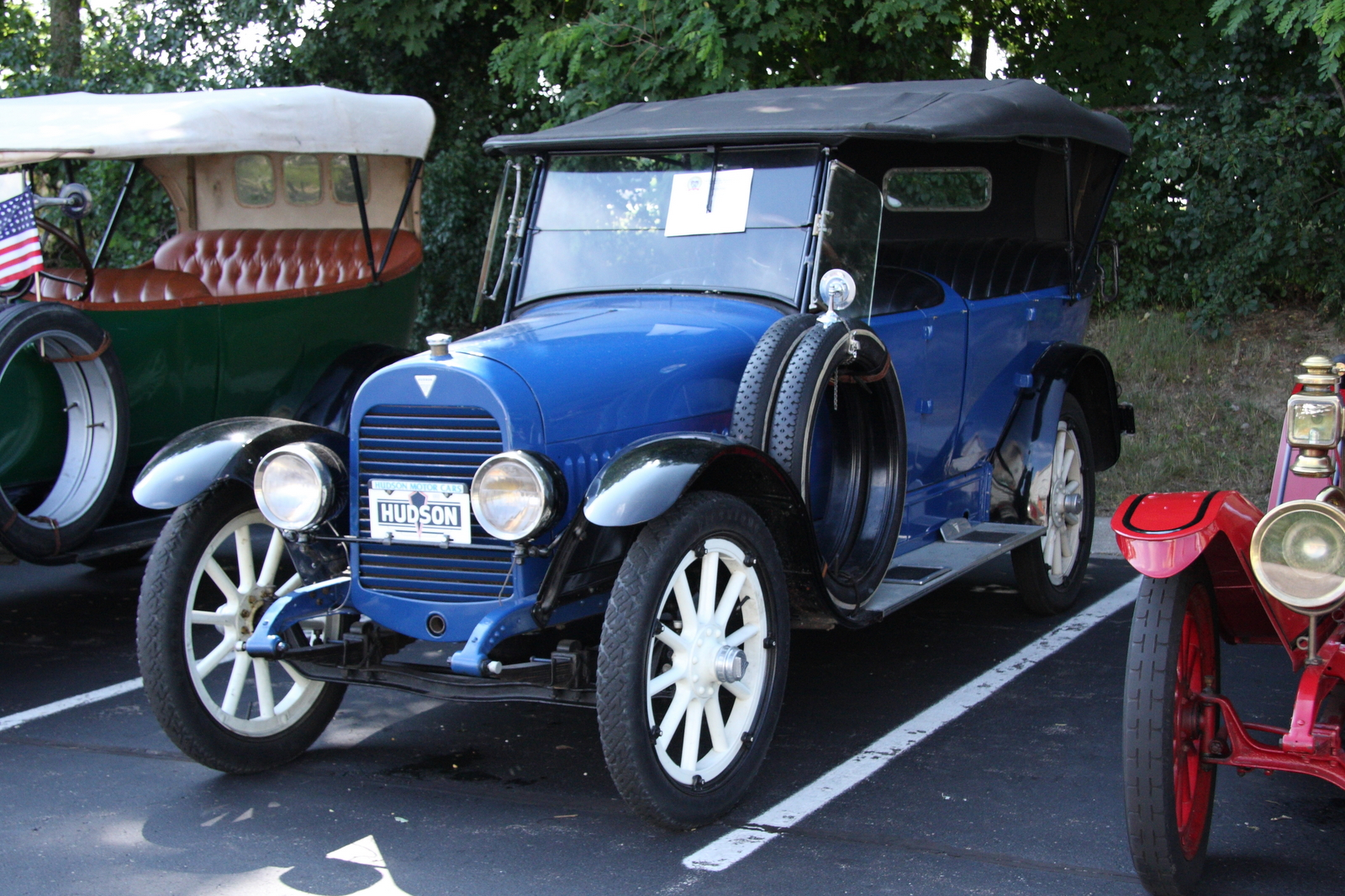
Hudson Super Six

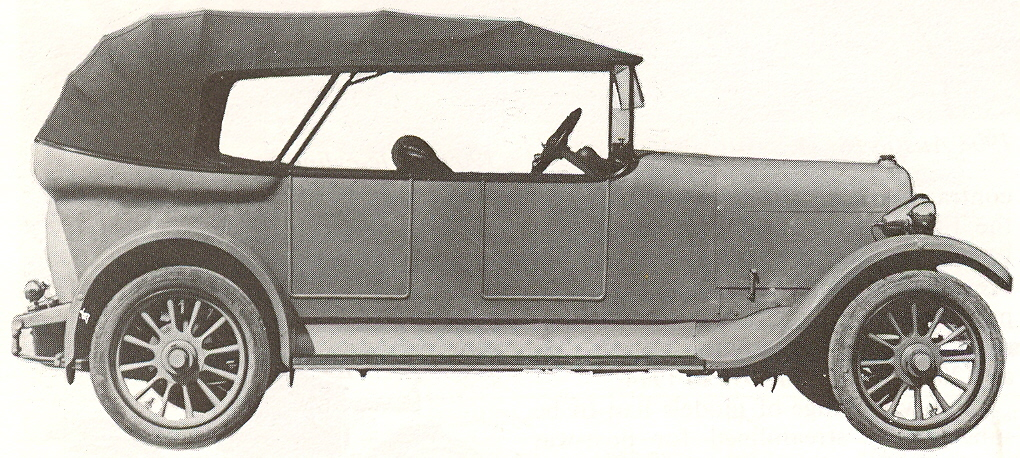
Austin Twenty tourer – considered by The Times rather ugly

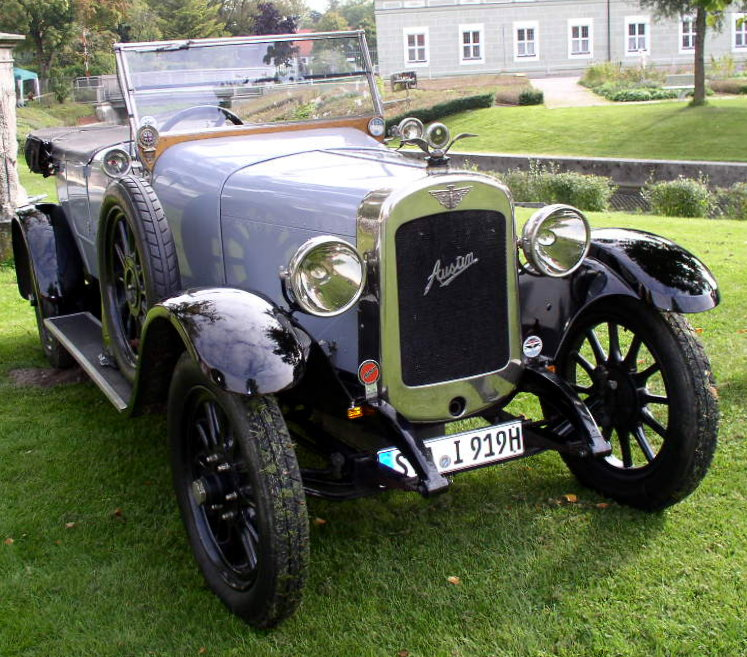
1919 Twenty tourer – this is not an Austin body rather a twin cowl tourer built by Stan Harding in the early 1990s.

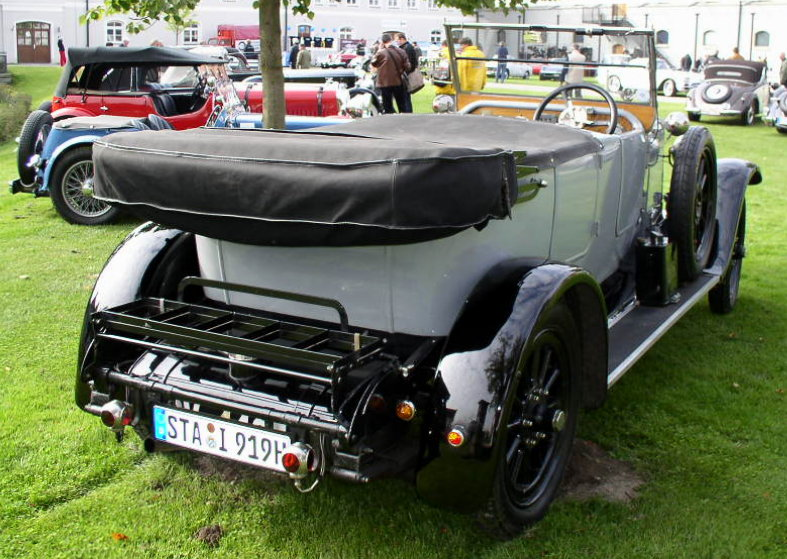
1919 replica Tourer, now registered in the Isle of Man and changed to Kingfisher Blue over Black wings

During the war, Hebert Austin had owned an American Hudson Super Six, which he clearly admired. Its overall layout would form a basis for the design of the new one model car policy. The car would, however, prove to be too large for the home market: only about 3,000 Twenties had been sold by July 1920.

=== Massed motor-car production, the first British example ===
Perhaps hoping to help, The Times published a long item at the beginning of June 1920 in which they professed admiration for Austin's enterprise in launching on the British market "a car made on American lines". The result, they said, "is good but not of the class of the old 20-hp. It would have been wiser to have given the new car a new name. The whole finish is poor. The engine vibrates at anything over moderate speeds and sometimes at low speeds. It is difficult to access the power unit and the whole car is difficult to associate with the 10-hp and 15-hp, the famous 18-hp and the 20-hp which did so well in the 1914 Alpine Trials.

"However it is true the car is an excellent hill-climber, runs very quietly, accelerates rapidly and has very good steering. The (unfortunately) central gear change is good if a shade is coarse. The wheel brakes worked by their side lever are excellent", but the transmission brake worked by the pedal was described as "indifferent". "The car holds the road well at any speed and the springing is good. The coachwork is comfortable enough but the open body is rather ugly".

Summing up, the motoring correspondent suggested that "if pains were taken to damp out engine vibration and a slightly higher price set which would allow more 'spit and polish' ... Austin will do a lasting service to the country and their shareholders".

=== Receivership for Austin ===
The one-model policy was rapidly dropped in mid-1921 when Austin's company was placed in receivership. Six months later in November 1921 Austin launched his Austin Twelve, in many ways a scaled-down Twenty.

== Four-cylinder engine ==
The engine with its 95 mm bore and 127 mm stroke had a cast-iron cylinder block with detachable cylinder head mounted on top of an aluminium crankcase. It developed 45 bhp at 2000 rpm. As an advance on pre-war practice, the engine was directly bolted to the four-speed centre-change gearbox, which drove the rear wheels through an open propeller shaft.

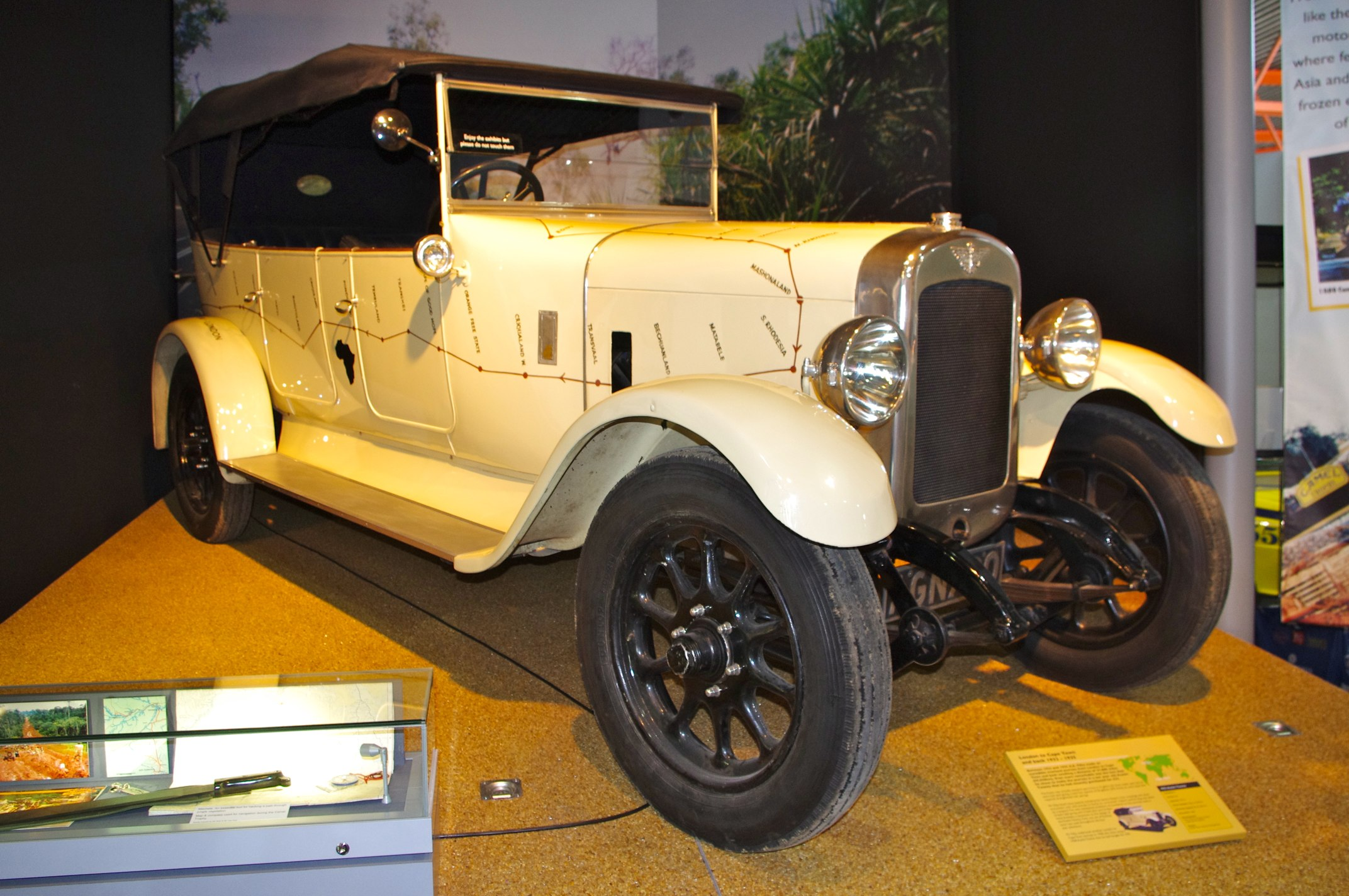
The car driven by A E Filby from London to Cape Town and back in 1932 and 1935

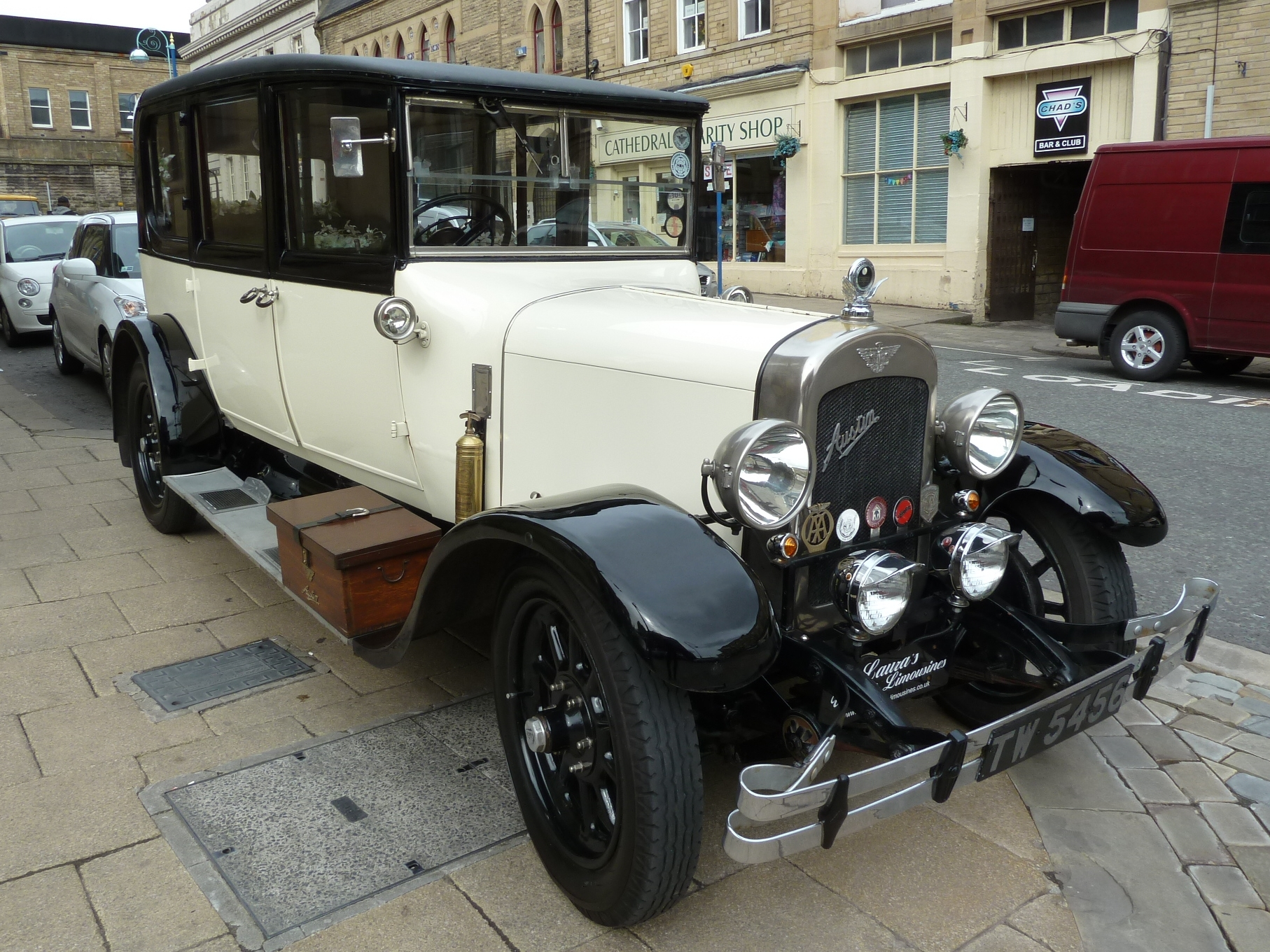
Mayfair limousine 3.6-litre 1926 with aftermarket bumper

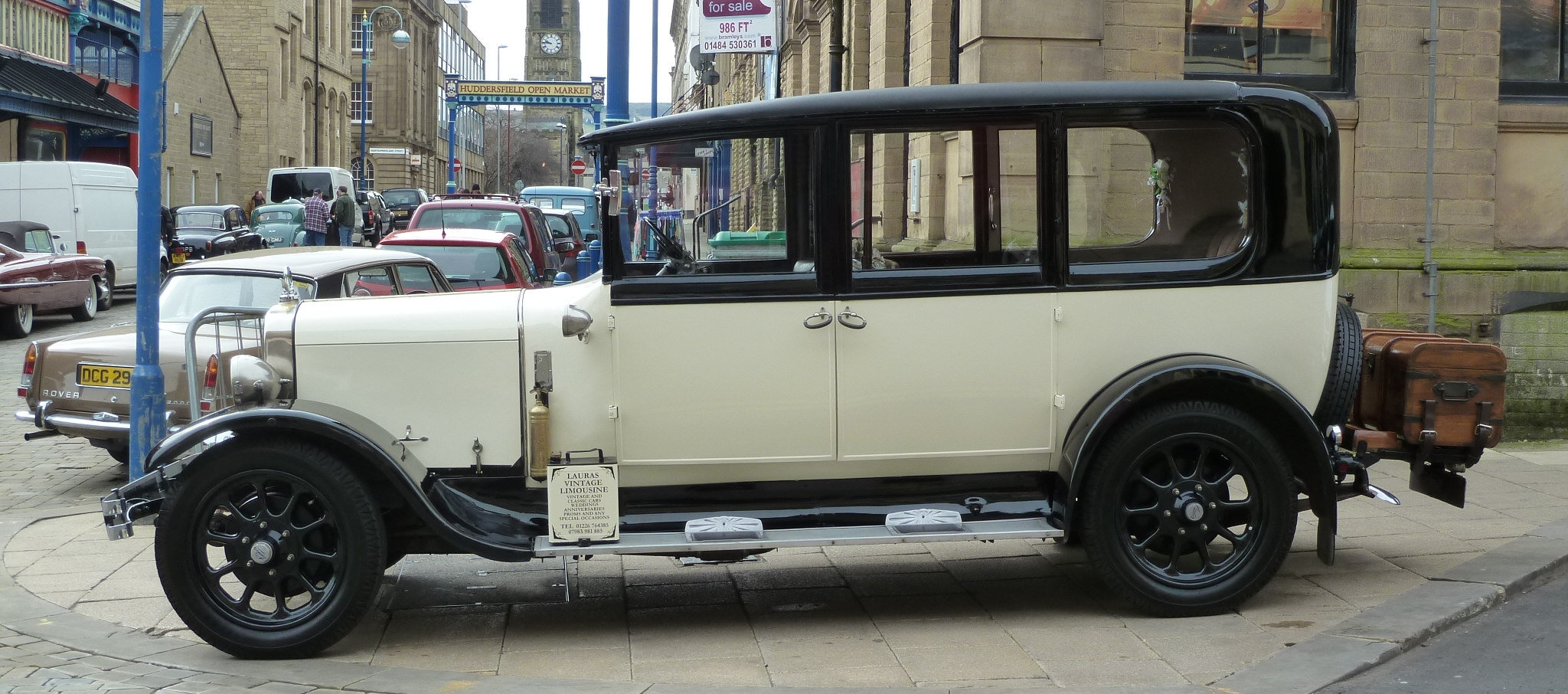
Mayfair limousine 3.6-litre 1926

=== Chassis ===
The chassis, based on that of the Hudson, was conventional, with semi-elliptic leaf springs on all wheels and rigid axles front and rear. Wooden-spoked artillery-style wheels were fitted. Initially, brakes were on the rear wheels only, but front-wheel brakes were fitted as standard from 1925, and at the same time the wheels became steel-spoked.

=== Body ===
At its 1919 introduction three body types were listed; a tourer, coupé and landaulette. These were joined in 1921 by the Ranelagh fixed head, two-door, coupé. For 1922 the Grosvenor limousine and landaulette, a Ranelagh four-door, fixed head, coupé and Westminster drop-head coupé were added.

A 75 mph Sports variant was added in 1921 with a modified higher-compression engine and wire wheels, but it was very expensive, and only around 23 were sold.

As well as the cars, a range of commercial vehicles was also built on the chassis.

By the end of October 1921 Austin was able to advertise that 6,566 Austin Twenty cars were now on the road, 2,246 had so far been delivered during 1921, and that distributors and agents were showing unbounded confidence with their orders for Twenties and the new Austin Twelve, placing large contracts for 1922.
Prices at Works were: tourer £695, coupé £850 and landaulet (sic) £875. Marlborough landaulet, £950 at Works.

Effective 4 April 1923 in response to harsh market conditions but in public attributed to improved facilities for manufacture and lower cost of materials and labour, prices were reduced to the following:

- Chassis £500
- Tourer 5-seater £595
- Westminster 2-door coupé £750
- Ranelagh 4-door coupé £750
- Marlborough Landaulet or Limousine £750
- Mayfair Saloon Landaulet or Limousine £850 ·

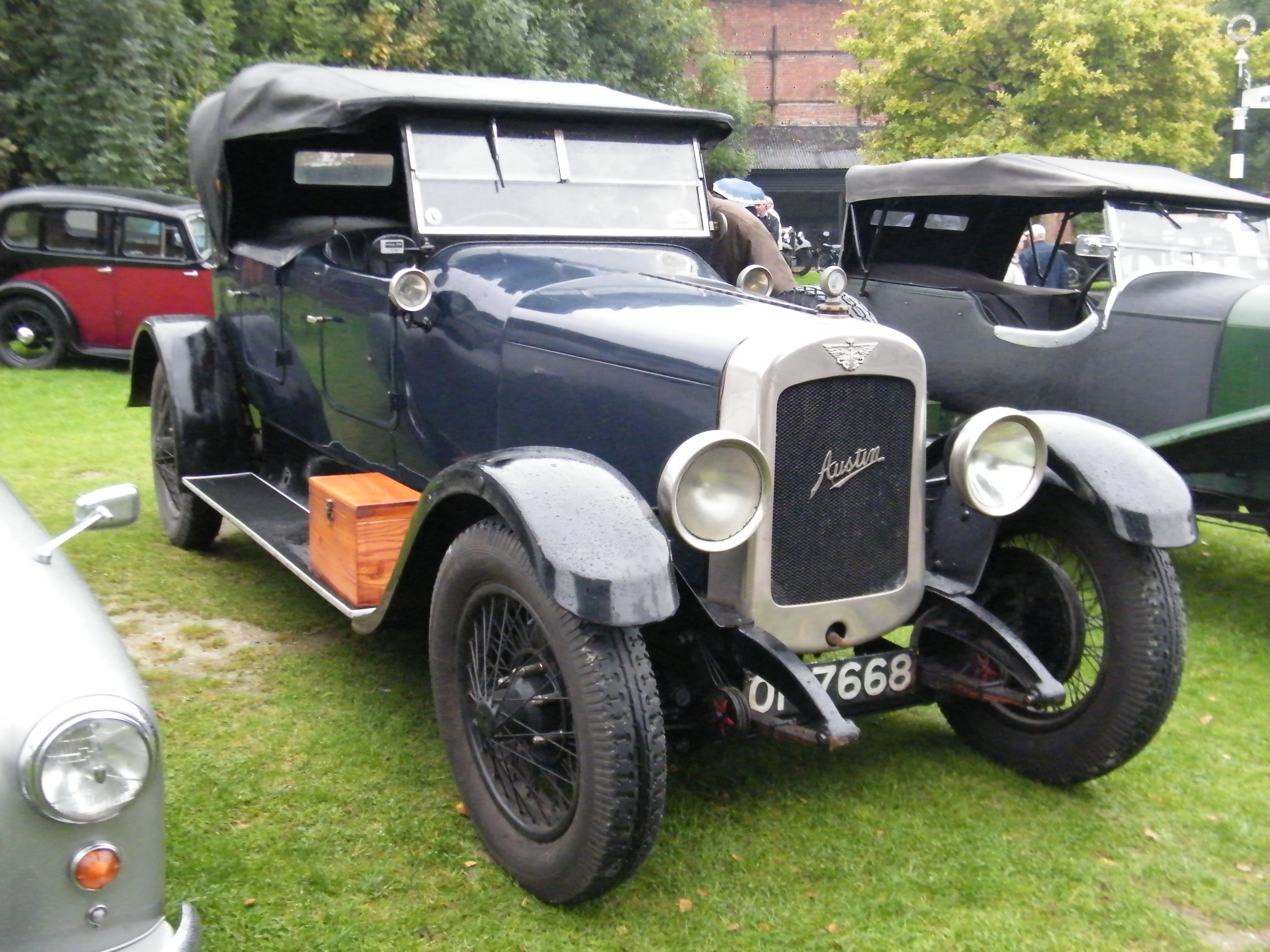
Twenty 4-cylinder tourer May 1927

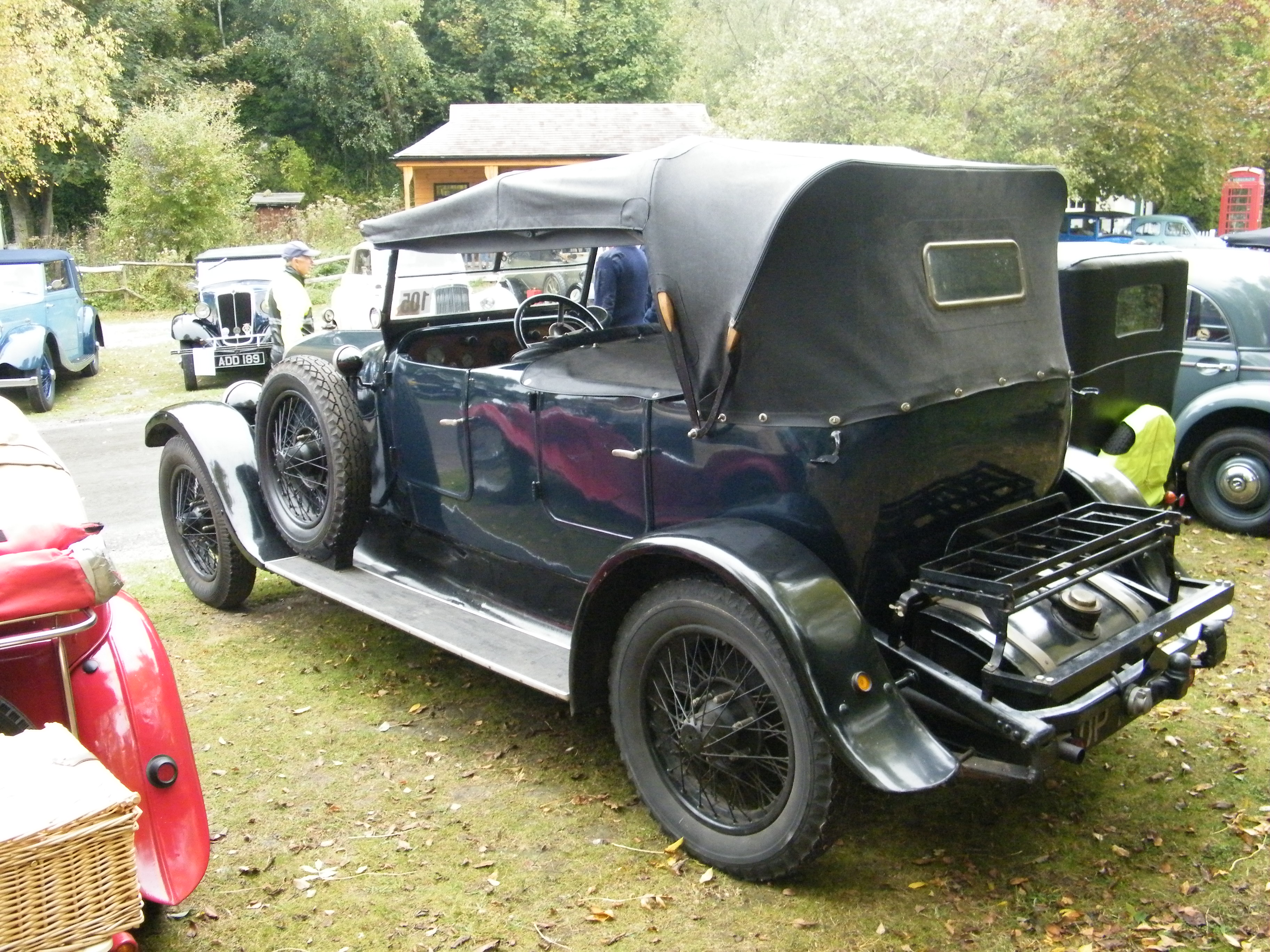

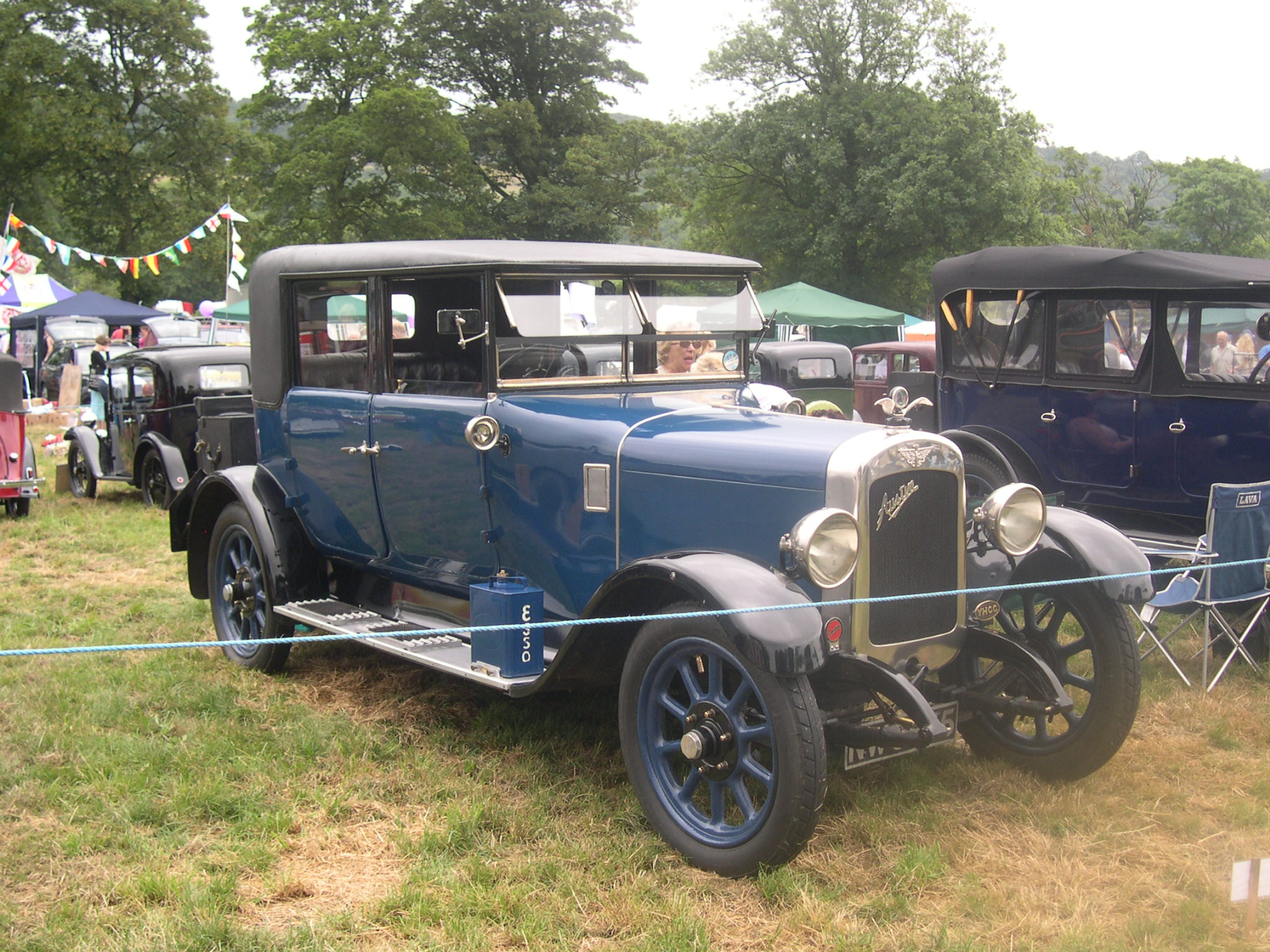
Ranelagh 6-cylinder saloon 1925

== 20/6 Six-cylinder engine ==
Austin Twenty
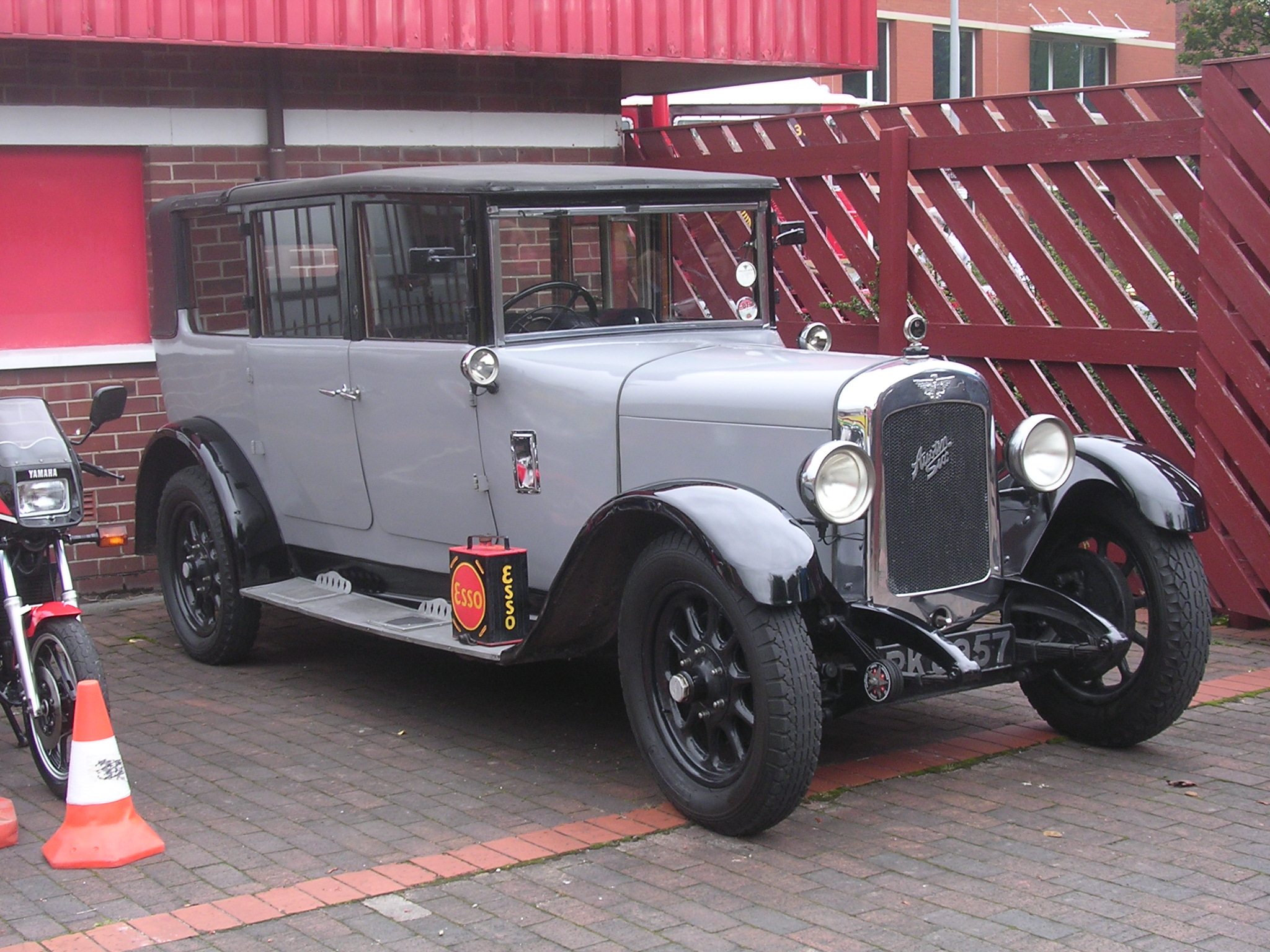
- Austin 20/6 Gordon Landaulette, 3.4-litre, 1929.

Overview
- Production: May 1928–mid 1932

Body and chassis
- Body style: saloon, limousine

Powertrain
- Engine: 3,397 cc (207 cu in) Straight-six or 3,610 cc (220 cu in) Straight-4
- Transmission: single-plate clutch; four-speed and reverse gearbox; propeller shaft to back axle with helical-bevel gearing

Dimensions
- Wheelbase: Ranelagh 136 in (3,454 mm); Mayfair 130 in (3,302 mm); Whitehall 120 in (3,048 mm); Carlton 120 in (3,048 mm); Track 56 in (1,422 mm)
- Kerb weight: 36 long cwt (4,032 lb; 1,829 kg)

Chronology
- Predecessor: Austin 20
- Successor: Austin 20/6

Austin Six engine 20 / 6

Overview
- Production: October 1926–mid 1938

Layout
- Configuration: Straight 6-cylinder
- Displacement: 3,397 cc (207 cu in)
- Cylinder bore: 79.35 mm (3.124 in)
- Piston stroke: 114.5 mm (4.51 in)
- Cylinder block material: a separate casting from the head and crankcase. crankshaft is carried in 8 bearings
- Cylinder head material: detachable, pistons are aluminium
- Valvetrain: side-valves are on the nearside of the block. tappets are automatically lubricated. timing is as the back of the engine.

Combustion
- Fuel system: dual carburettor, fed by gravity from vacuum tank on dash. manifold provides heating for the mixture Fuel feed by Autovac
- Fuel type: petrol
- Oil system: forced feed
- Cooling system: Radiator is within an external shell, fan is operated by belt and there is a pump to force circulation of water There is an adjustable thermostat

Output
- Power output: 49 bhp (37 kW; 50 PS) @2,000 rpm 58 bhp (43 kW; 59 PS) @2,600 rpm Tax horsepower 23.42

Chronology
- Predecessor: Austin 20/4
- Successor: Austin 28

=== New body October 1926 ===
The car that was destined to succeed the Twenty, the six-cylinder 20/6, was announced at the October 1926 London Motor Show with production really starting in early 1928, and until 1930 the two different engines were sold alongside each other, but 1929 would be the last year of full production for what was now called the 20/4.

There was a 12-volt electrical system for lighting and starting. Timing was at the back of the engine. From there on the off-side were driven in-line the generator, water-pump and magneto. Reported refinements for the 1929 Motor Show included: chromium-plated exterior fittings, Triplex glass, improved (dome type) "mud wings (front mudguards) and new gas (sic) and ignition control levers "neatly placed above the steering wheel". For 1930 the specification included Biflex magnetic dip and switch headlights and wire wheels.

=== Chassis ===
The engine, clutch and gearbox, which was centrally controlled, all formed one assembly that was held in the frame by two brackets with a rubber-lined frame at the front. The rear axle was three-quarter floating.

==== Steering ====
Steering is worm and worm wheel type. Beneath the hand wheel there is a convenient ring-operated horn switch.

==== Brakes ====
Behind the gearbox there was a "locomotive" transmission brake operated by a hand lever on the off-side of the gear lever. The brake's shoes were to some extent self-adjusting but might be regulated by two hand screws. "This brake is intended to be more than just a parking brake". The four wheels had brakes operated by rods from the brake pedal. Compensation was made so that balance was preserved in the back and front sets of brakes. The application was partly taken by rods but finally by cables. The brake drums were enclosed and have outlets for water or oil. The front braking mechanism was simple, there was only one arm which had anchorage above the pivot pin and did not turn with the wheel. The cams were at the bottom of the drums and the steering pins were hollowed to allow the necessary expanding control.

==== Suspension ====
The front and back springs were half-elliptical. At the back they were carried under the axle. Both sets had lubricating gaiters and shock absorbers. There was no camber to the forward springs. There were no stops behind the back shackles.

=== Pricing ===
- Ascot 4-cylinder £620
- Open Road tourer 4-cylinder £425
- Open Road tourer 6-cylinder £525
- Carlton saloon 4-cylinder £495
- Carlton saloon 6-cylinder £595
- Marlborough landaulette 4-cylinder £475
- Mayfair 4-cylinder £715
- Ranelagh limousine or landaulette 4-cylinder £575
- Ranelagh limousine or landaulette 6-cylinder £675 ·

=== Road test ===
Seats are comfortable. The speedometer only showed up to 60 mph, within the engine's capacity. No sign of overheating. Clutch satisfactory, lower gears much quieter than on previous Austins. Brakes suspension and steering were not at all bad but could be made better.

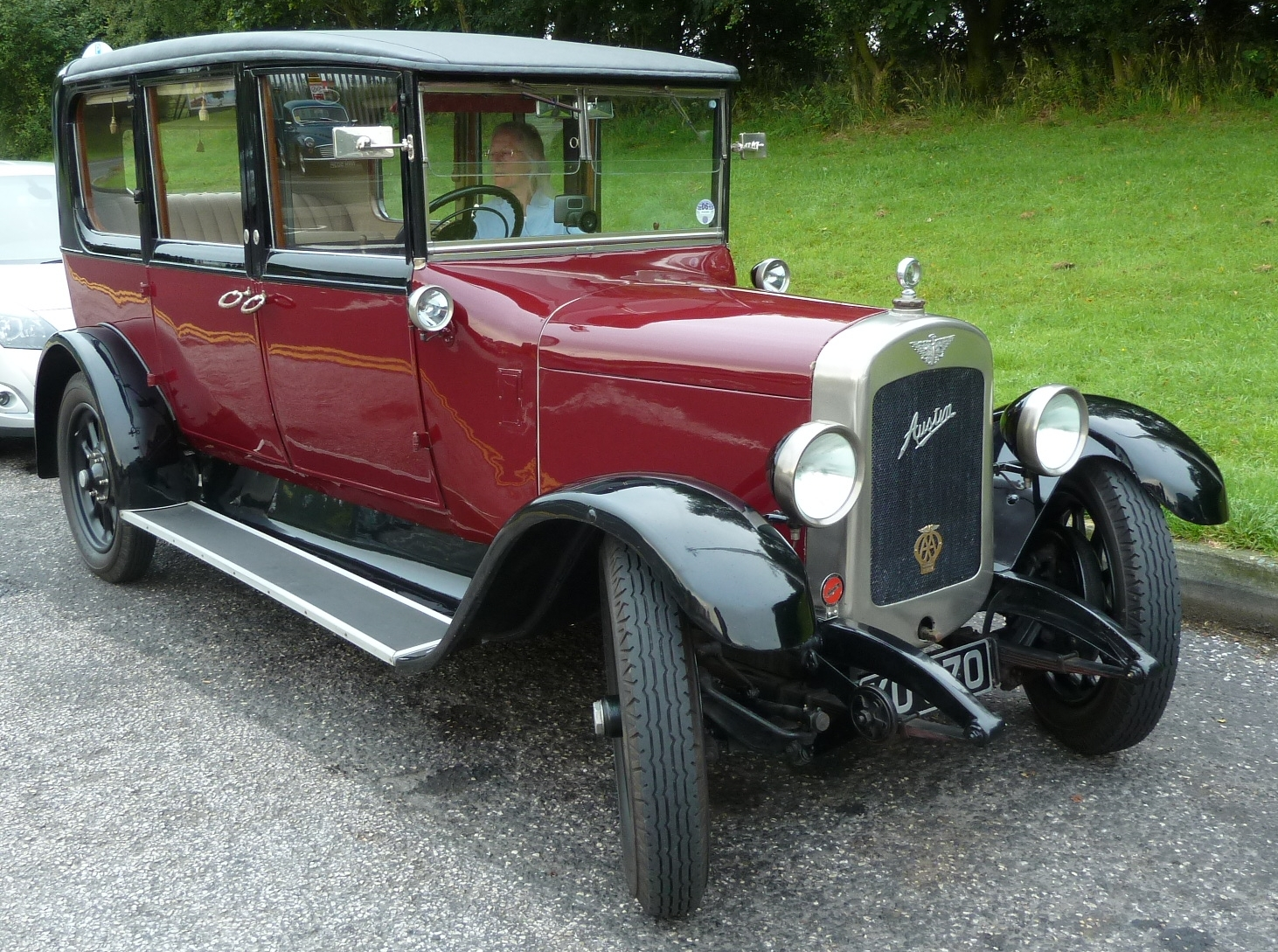
Twenty four Mayfair saloon 3.6-litre 1927

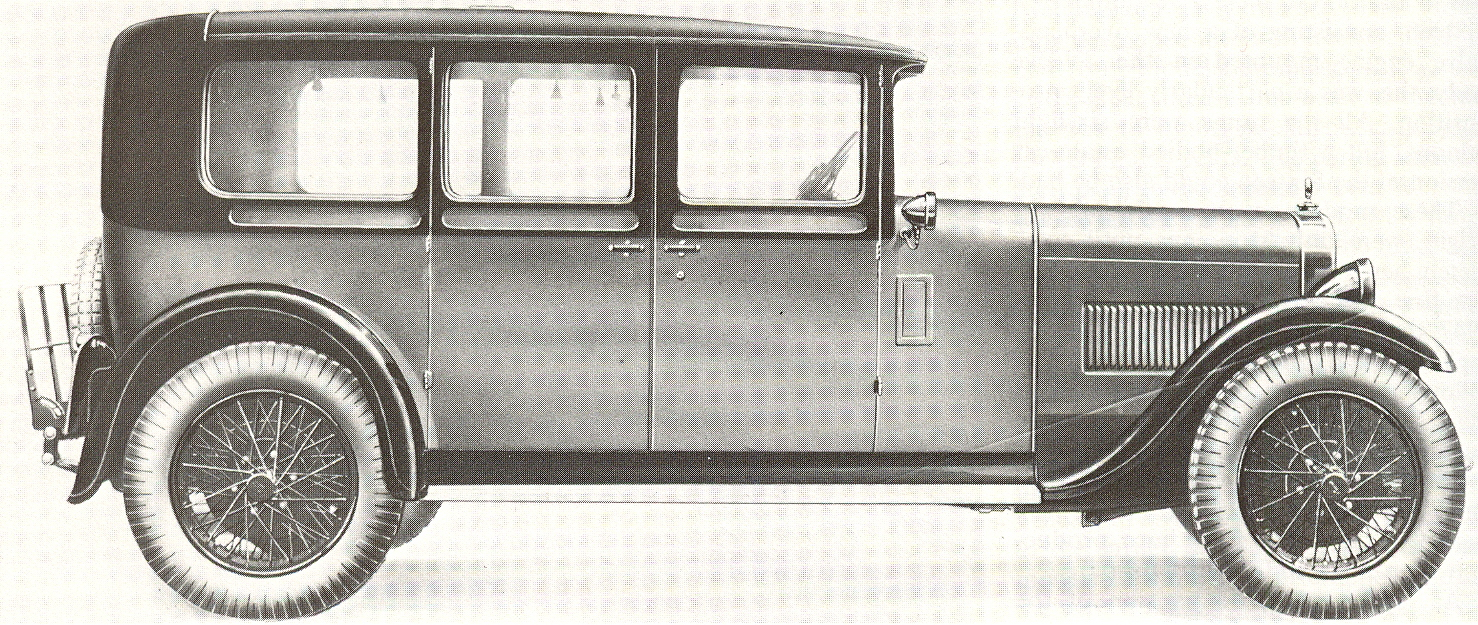
Twenty six Ranelagh limousine 3.4-litre 1931

=== New body August 1932 ===
Austin Twenty
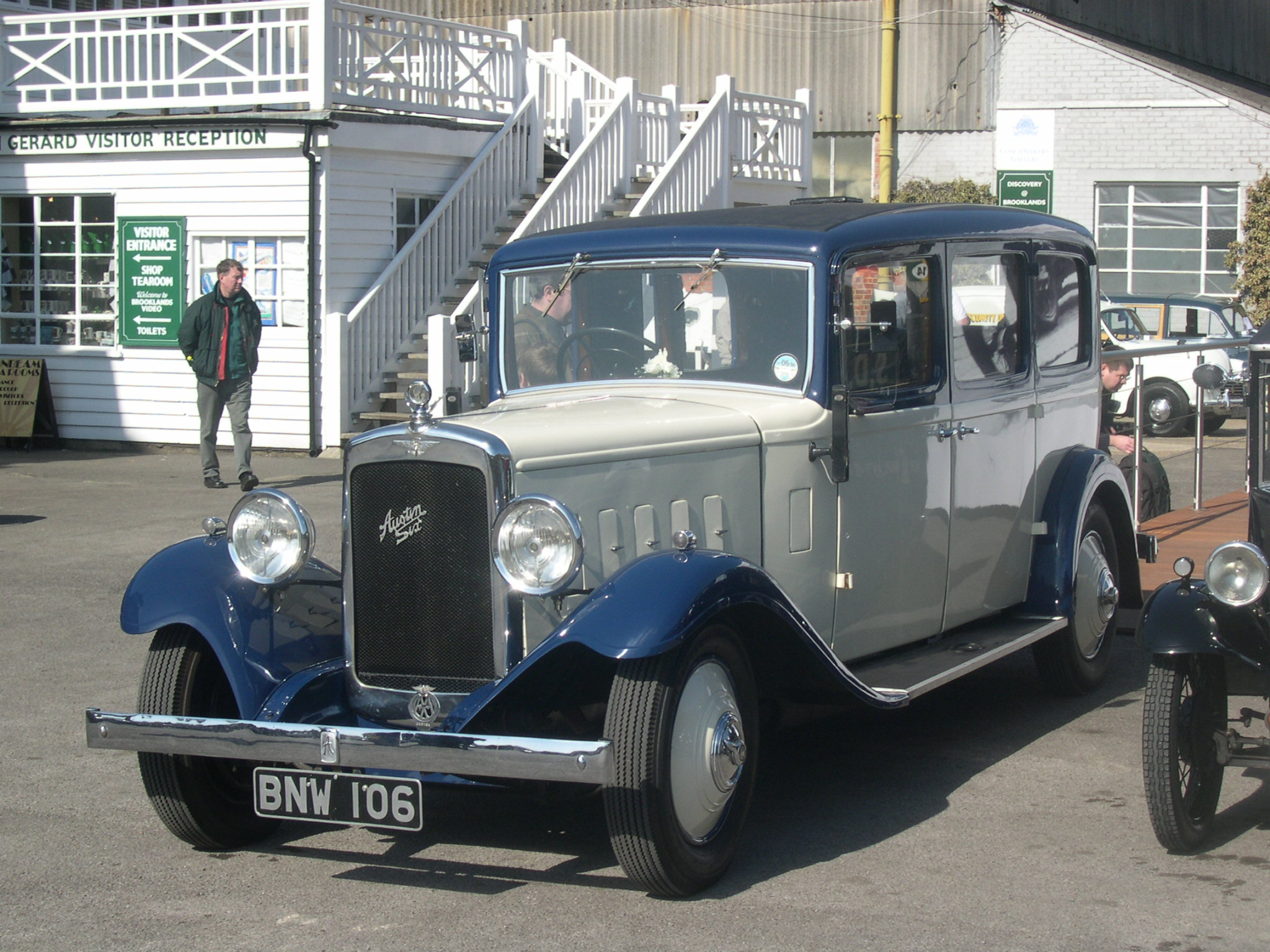
- Ranelagh 20/6 limousine 1935

Overview
- Production: August 1932–mid 1934

Body and chassis
- Body style: saloon, limousine

Powertrain
- Engine: 3,397 cc (207 cu in) Straight-six

Chronology
- Predecessor: Austin 20/6
- Successor: Austin 20/6

"A body design that makes this magnificent seven-seater even more than ever like a £1,000 car. Its streamline front, waistline moulding and petrol tank housing, all new, enhance its superb lines". Synchromesh was added to the gearbox in mid 1933. Other minor improvements included: illuminated semaphore direction indicators, side deflectors for the front door windows and an interior visor, a lockable metal spare wheel cover.

The Twenty remained available as a Ranelagh limousine or landaulette both on a wheelbase of 11 ft 4in., £595, or as a Whitehall saloon with a 10 ft wheelbase £515.

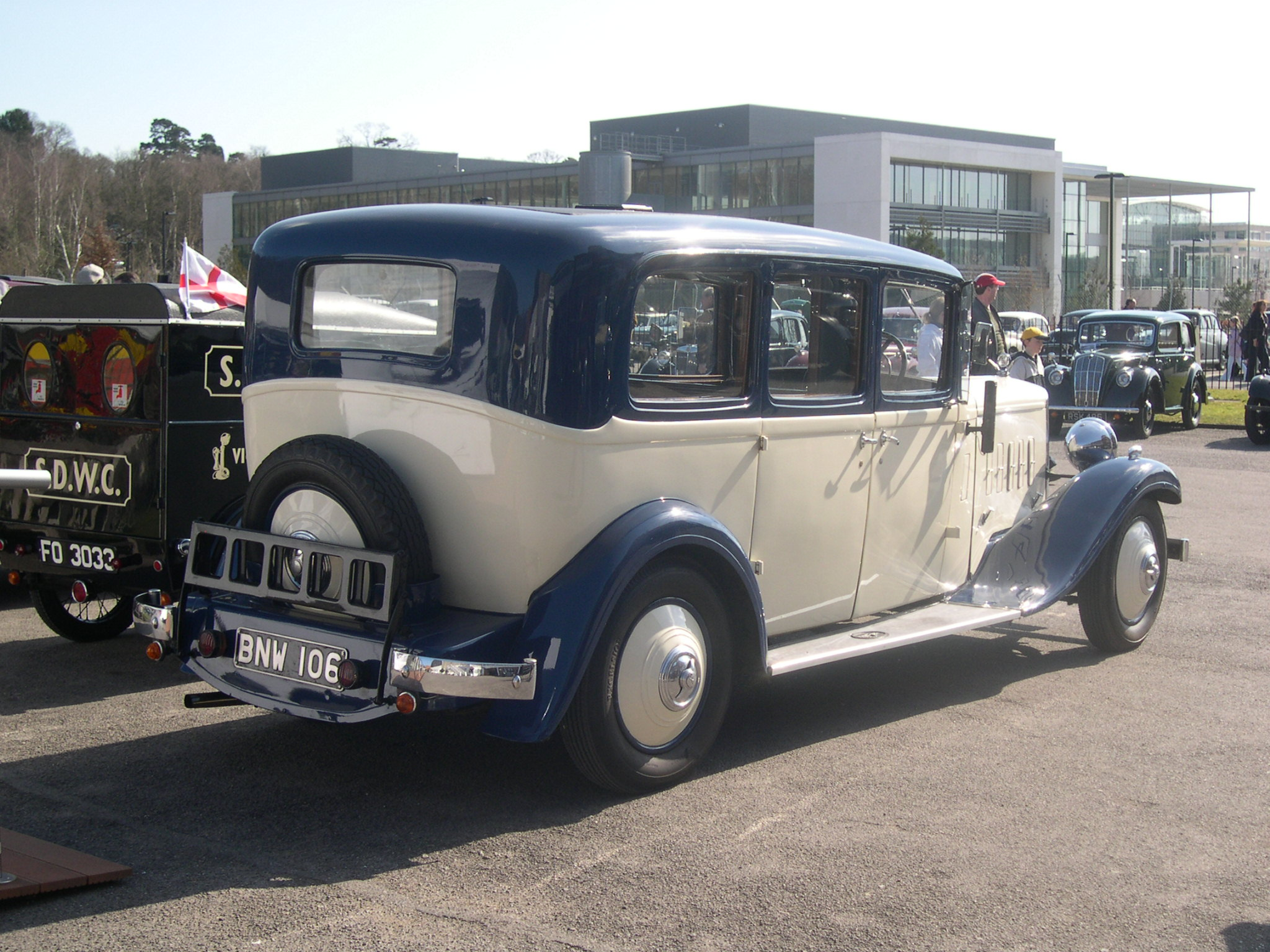
Ranelagh rear view 1935

=== Road test ===
This 7-seater limousine has four good doors and six side windows. Front seat is fixed as is unfortunately the windscreen but the screen is large and gives a good view. The back seat has three armrests. The occasional seats fold away neatly, give enough support to the back and knee and toe room is well arranged. Equipment includes such fittings as: two interior lights, five blinds, parcel net and ventilator in the roof, bag pockets on the doors. Upholstery in the rear is cord and in front is leather. There is a large cupboard to the left of the instruments. An amplifying telephone (to the driver) is provided. The gear lever has a catch for reverse and a quiet-second together with synchro-mesh is provided. There are just the four brakes which are applied by rods and cables by hand lever or by pedal. The half-elliptical springs have Silentbloc shackle bushes and zinc interleaves and are damped by hydraulic shock absorbers. Price £575.

=== New body August 1934 ===
Austin Twenty
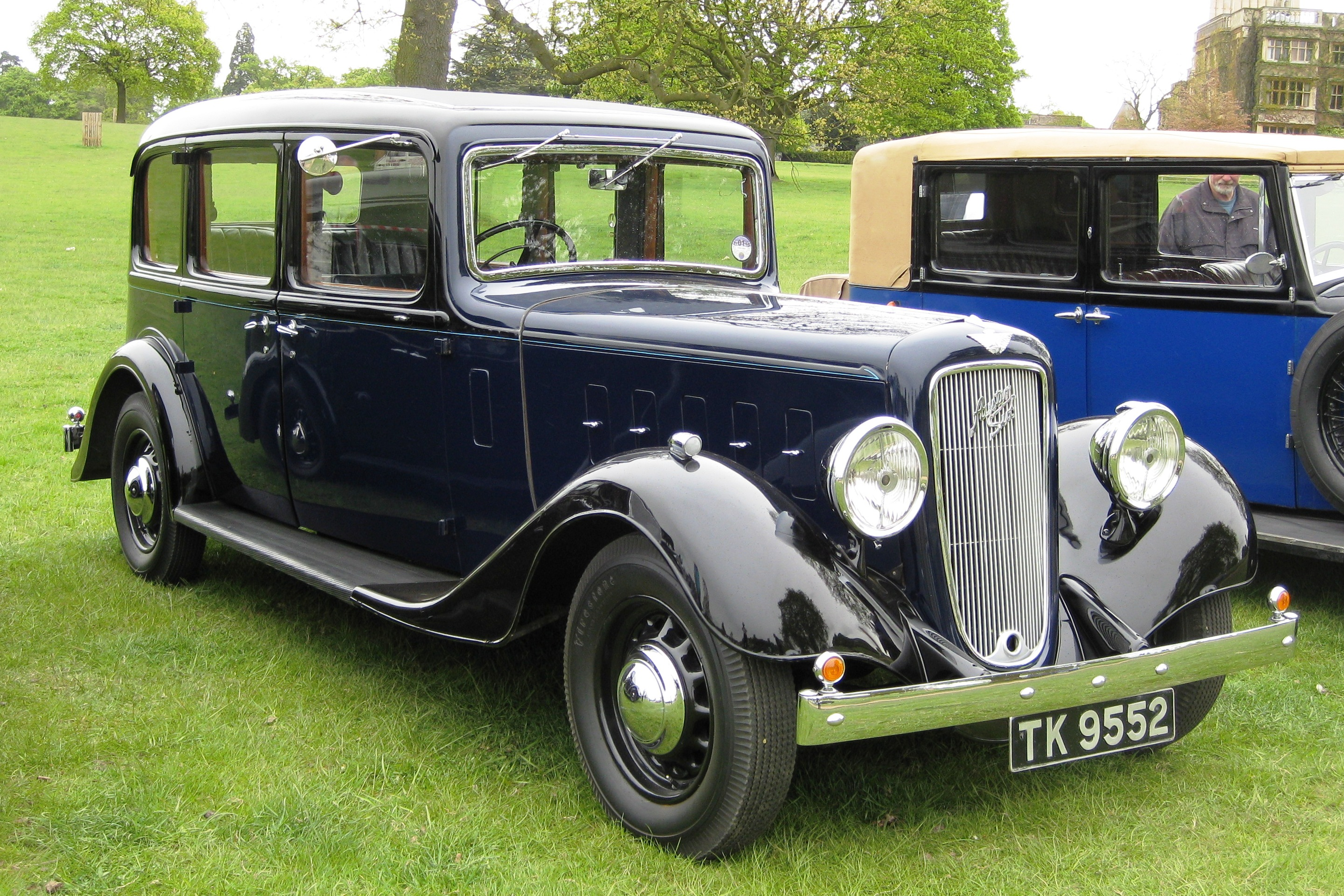
- Ranelagh 20/6 limousine 1936

Overview
- Production: August 1934–mid 1938

Body and chassis
- Body style: saloon, limousine

Powertrain
- Engine: 3,397 cc (207 cu in) Straight-six

Dimensions
- Wheelbase: 136 in (3,500 mm) track 57.25 in (1,454 mm)
- Length: 199 in (5,100 mm)
- Width: 70.5 in (1,790 mm)
- Height: 76 in (1,900 mm)

Chronology
- Predecessor: Austin 20
- Successor: Austin 28

"Clean-cut beauty in the modern trend". "Entirely new frontal design including a longer bonnet and new-shaped radiator and rear panelling". Synchromesh on all but first gear. Flush direction indicators with automatic return. Bumpers are fitted fore and aft. The spare wire wheel and its tyre are now carried in the boot and the luggage platform on the door can be swivelled to one side. Dip and switch of the headlamps is controlled by a foot button. The Jackall four-wheel hydraulic jacks, workable from inside the car, will raise all four wheels at once or the front and back ones in pairs. The brakes are of Girling type.

=== Road test ===
The engine has been greatly improved in its running as to its smoothness and refinement probably due to the revised carburation. Synchromesh is often obstructive for second gear. The landaulette will do about 65 miles an hour in top gear. Price £650, landaulette and limousine.

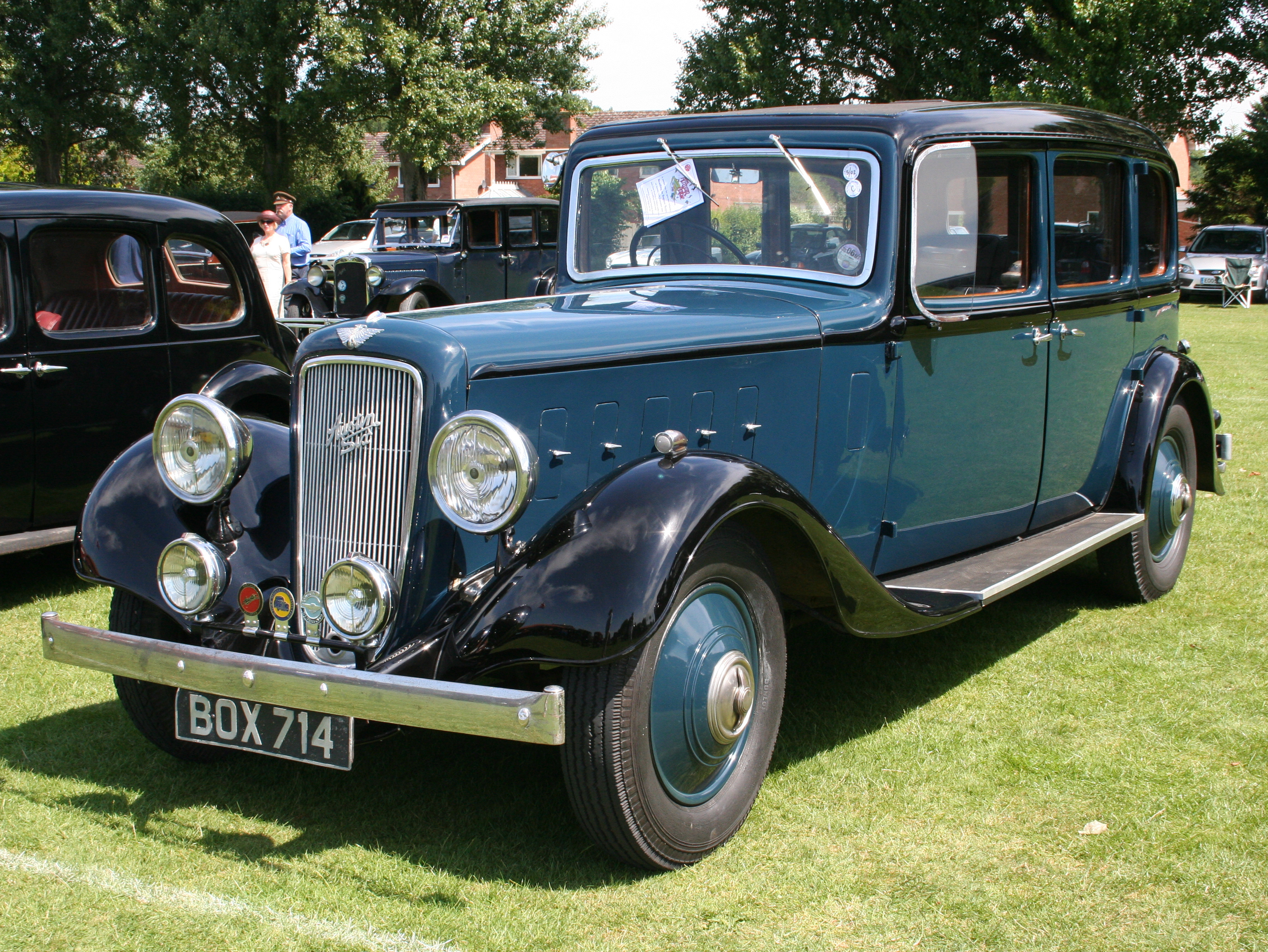
Mayfair 20/6 saloon 1936

Produced:

- 1933— 629
- 1934— 491
- 1935— 555
- 1936—
- 1937— 380

== 28 Six-cylinder engine ==
Austin Twenty-Eight
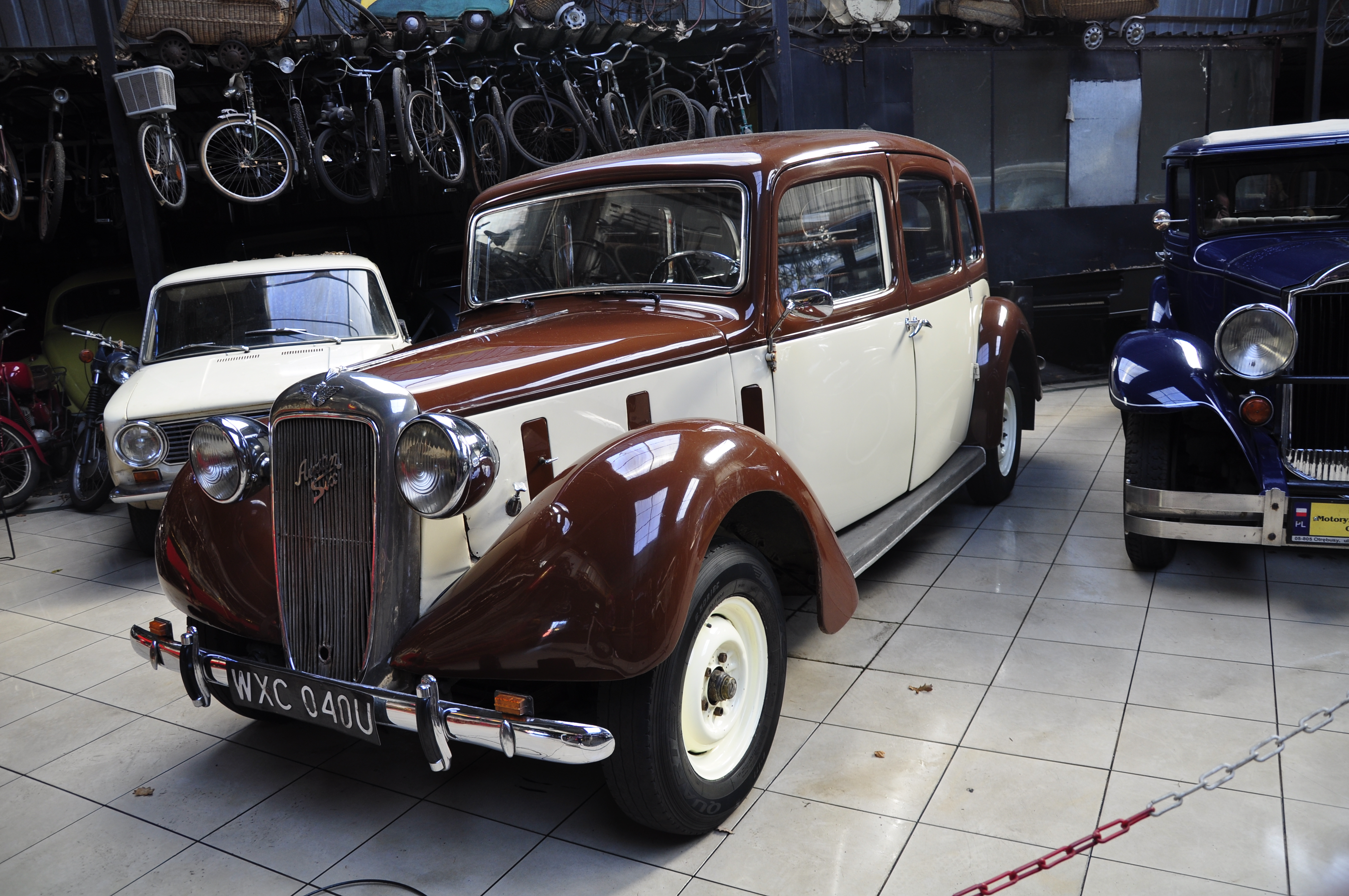
- Ranelagh 28 limousine 1939

Overview
- Production: July 1938 – September 1939; Quantity 300 (sold); 1938—138; 1939—152; 1940—10

Body and chassis
- Body style: saloon, limousine

Powertrain
- Engine: 4,016 cc (245 cu in) Straight-six

Dimensions
- Wheelbase: 136 in (3,454 mm); Track front: 58 in (1,473 mm); Track rear: 60 in (1,524 mm)
- Kerb weight: 39 long cwt (4,368 lb; 1,981 kg)

Chronology
- Predecessor: Austin 20
- Successor: Austin Sheerline

Austin 28 engine

Layout
- Configuration: Straight 6-cylinder
- Displacement: 4,016 cc (245 cu in)
- Cylinder bore: 86.36 mm (3.400 in)
- Piston stroke: 114.3 mm (4.50 in)
- Cylinder block material: Cast iron. Aluminium pistons with anodised surfaces. Four-bearing crankshaft with a vibration damper.
- Cylinder head material: aluminium, detachable
- Valvetrain: inclined side valves, inlet larger than exhaust, pressure lubrication for the tappets

Combustion
- Fuel system: downdraught carburettor, coil ignition with automatic advance
- Oil system: floating filter pick up for the oil pump and anti-surge valve
- Cooling system: forced water circulation thermostatically controlled

Output
- Power output: 90 bhp (67 kW; 91 PS) @3,200 rpm Tax horsepower 27.75

Chronology
- Predecessor: Austin 20/6 engine
- Successor: Austin D-Series engine OHV3460 cc and 3995 cc "100 hp engine"

=== New body July 1938 ===
The last of the Austin range to be given Dick Burzi's new body shape it was announced twelve months after the entry into production of Austin's update of their Sixteen into their stubby-nosed Eighteen, a 50% more powerful engine in a longer-nosed (by 18 inches) body. The new body which only shared its general appearance with the smaller Eighteen was described as notable for its roominess and luxurious comfort. Generous seating with a flat unobstructed floor together with draught-free ventilation by sliding quarter windows, sound insulation for all the steel body panels and generous luggage accommodation were further new features. Equipment includes a reversing light. The price of the new Twenty-Eight was £700.

Other improvements across the board included: pistol-grip handbrakes under the dashboard, increased luggage accommodation, piston-type hydraulic shock absorbers, more accessible batteries and a quick-filling petrol tank.

==== Steering ====
Steering system was by Marles-Weller.

==== Brakes ====
Brakes were by Girling.

==== Suspension ====
Rigid axles back and front supported low-periodicity positively lubricated half-elliptical springs with hydraulic shock absorbers and jacks.

=== New engine July 1938 ===
The new 4-litre engine was announced to a gathering of Austin agents and distributors at Longbridge at the end of July 1938. The design with the alloy cylinder head having proved so successful on the Austin Fourteen it would now be applied across the range. It included a higher compression ratio, "upwards of 6 : 1" which in combination with the larger inlet valves improved fuel consumption and power output.

The cylinder bore was increased by 7 mm from 79.35 to 86.36 mm lifting cubic capacity from 3.4-litres to 4-litres. The tax rating was increased from 23.42 to 27.75 but the power output went up from 58 bhp (43 kW; 59 PS) @2,600 rpm to a reported 90 bhp (67 kW; 91 PS) @3,200 rpm.

The previous eight main bearing crankshaft was replaced with a four-bearing crankshaft fitted with a vibration damper which decision fitted with the then current trend.

The new detachable aluminium alloy cylinder head was fitted over inclined side valves and anodised aluminium alloy pistons. Pressure lubrication was supplied to the tappets, coolant temperature was controlled by thermostat and coil ignition was provided with automatic advance.

=== Road test ===
A new and roomy seven-seater which has much to recommend it including the price. Unusually good windows, long and fairly deep give a good view and enhance the appearance of the car. The cushions and shaped squabs are comfortable, the compartments are divided by sliding glass panels. There are folding foot rests, blinds to the division window, shaped armchair backs to the seat and a double arm rest in the centre. The occasional seats give reasonable comfort, the doorways behind are wide, the boot has two good-sized fitted suitcases with the spare wheel below and its platform is designed to take 1½ cwt 168 lb (76 kg) of extra luggage.

The new engine has the extra refinement in running noticeable in the other new Austin units and shows much improvement on the former Twenty. The horn button and the signalling lever are on the top of the thin three-spoked steering wheel. The brake lever is inverted and under the dash. Accessible it does not interfere with entrance and has a thumb-plate trigger. The greatest comfortable speed was 70 miles per hour.

=== Stamina ===
In 2004 Martyn Nutland reported there were just two still in existence and some part of a third car.
