= Austin 18/24 =

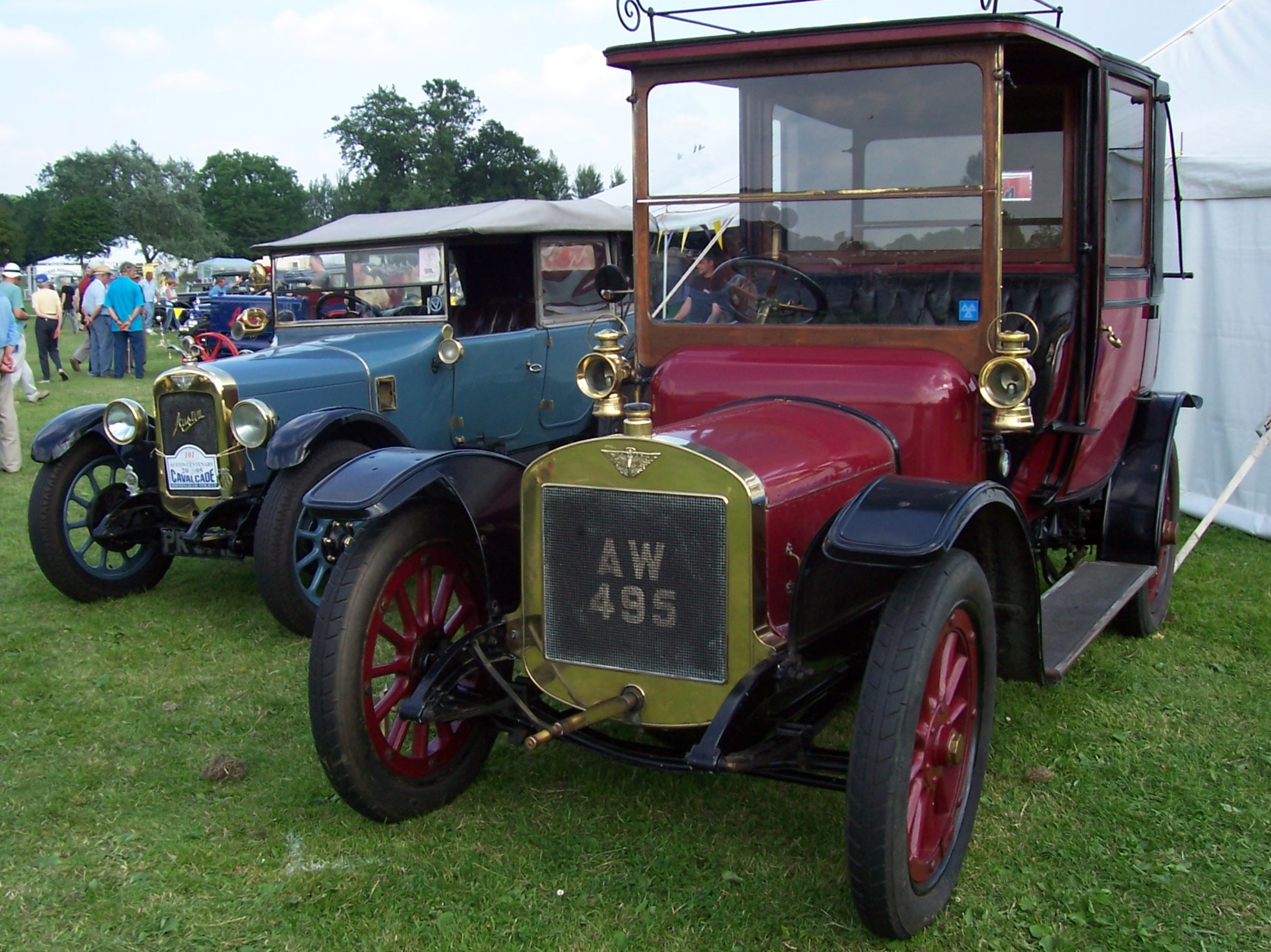
Norfolk landaulette 1908 car 290, engine 297

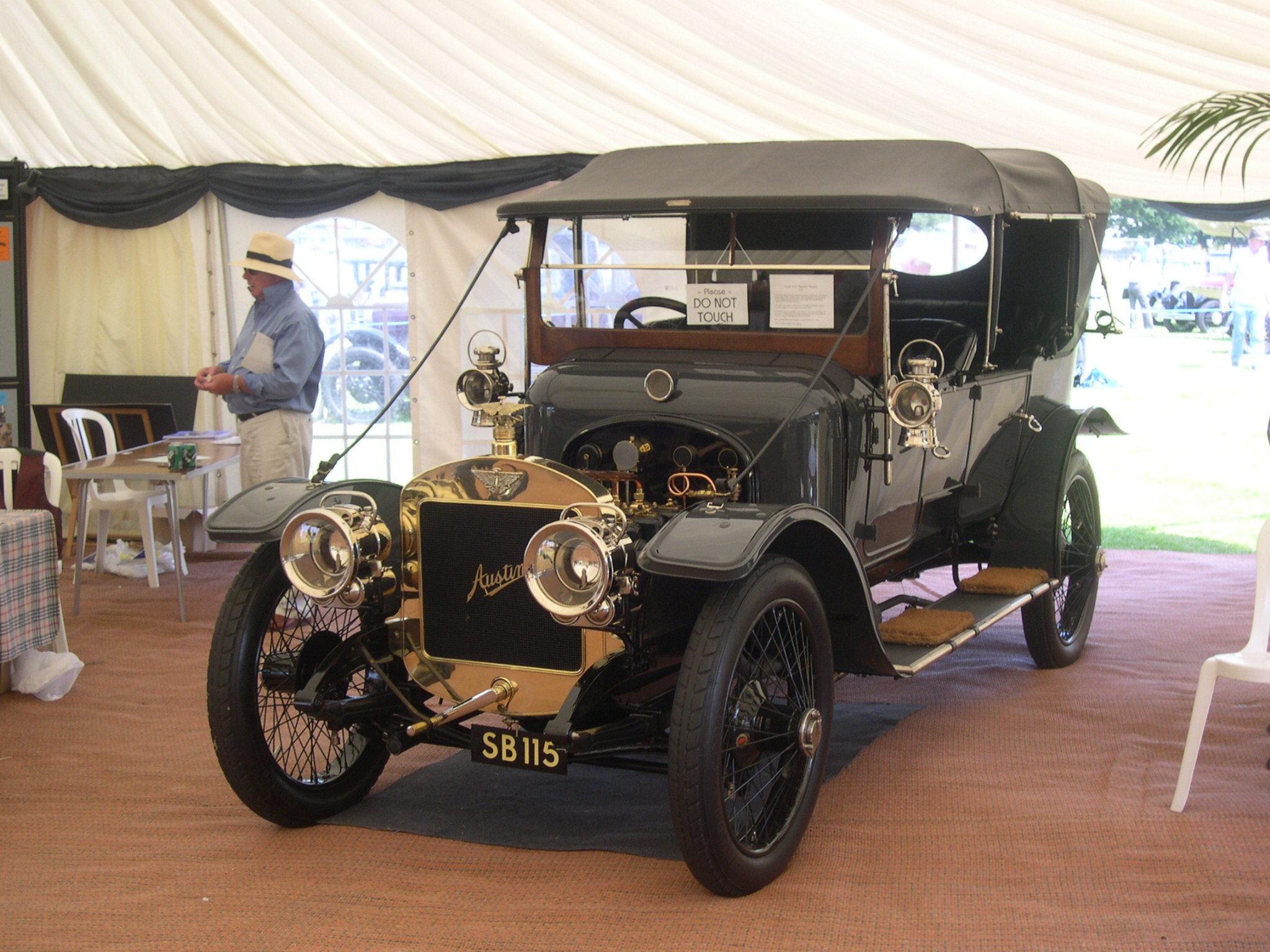
Speedily phaeton 1910 car 765, engine 813

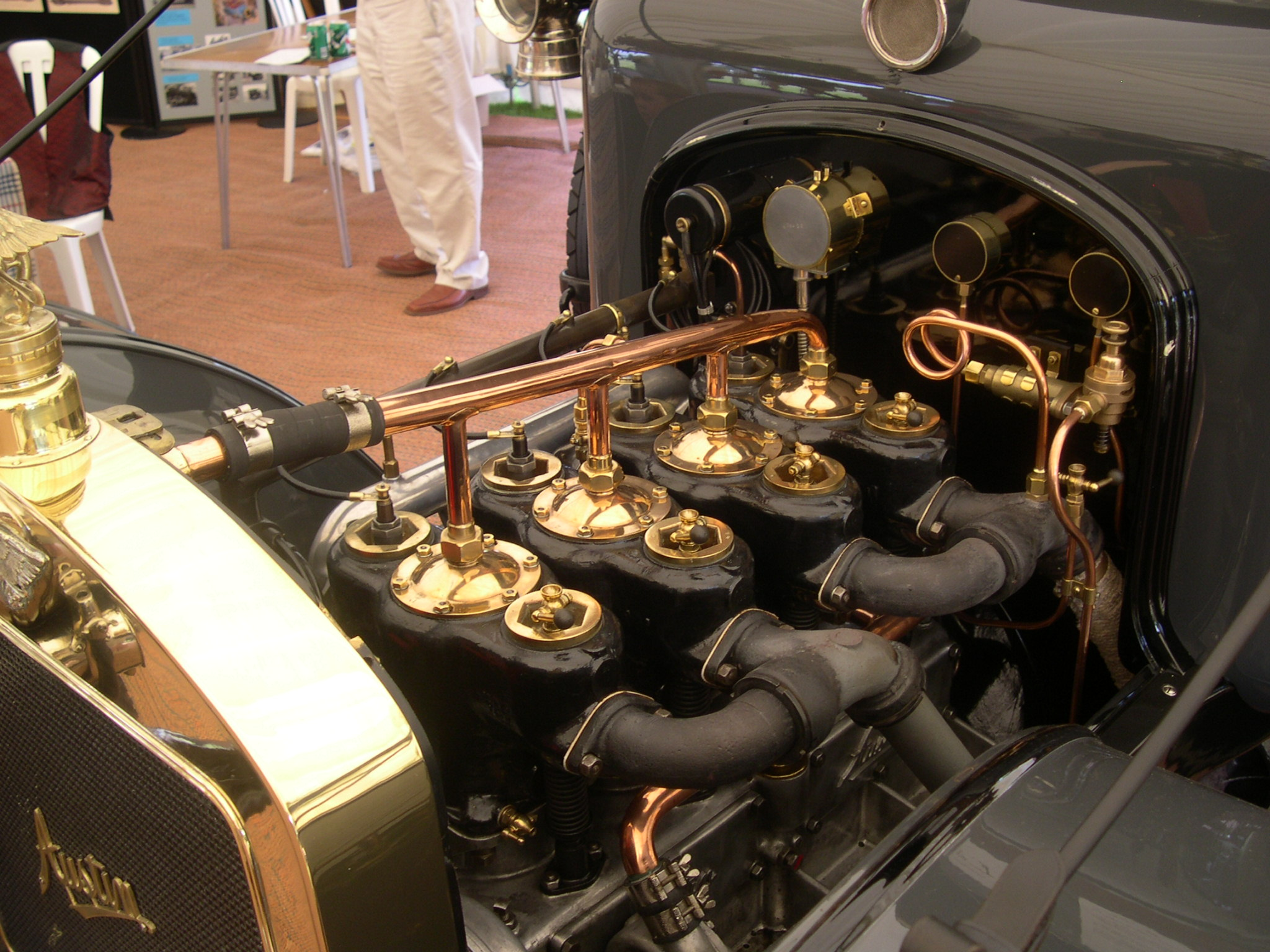
Speedily engine

The Austin 18-24 (or 18-24 hp) is a large 5-litre luxury motor-car that was produced by the British manufacturer Austin. Despite the name, its successive engines rated around 30 horsepower for tax purposes and the pundits of the day regarded it as really a 30–40. It was launched in 1907 with the 25-30's 5.3-litre (4 1/2 by 5 inches, 110 mm × 130 mm) engine and in Austin's catalogue replaced the 15-20, of which only four were made. The next year it used the 15-20's 4.4-litre engine.

In June 1920 The Times referred to it as (Austin's) ". . . famous 18-hp of years ago". The 18-24 was the first big seller for Austin, reaching sales of 1,566 by the end of 1913.

It was in fact replaced for 1914 by the 6.1-litre 30.6 tax horsepower Austin 30 hp. though the catalogue showed a new 20-hp described by the same pundits with the note "20 hp is a very fair estimate of its ranking".

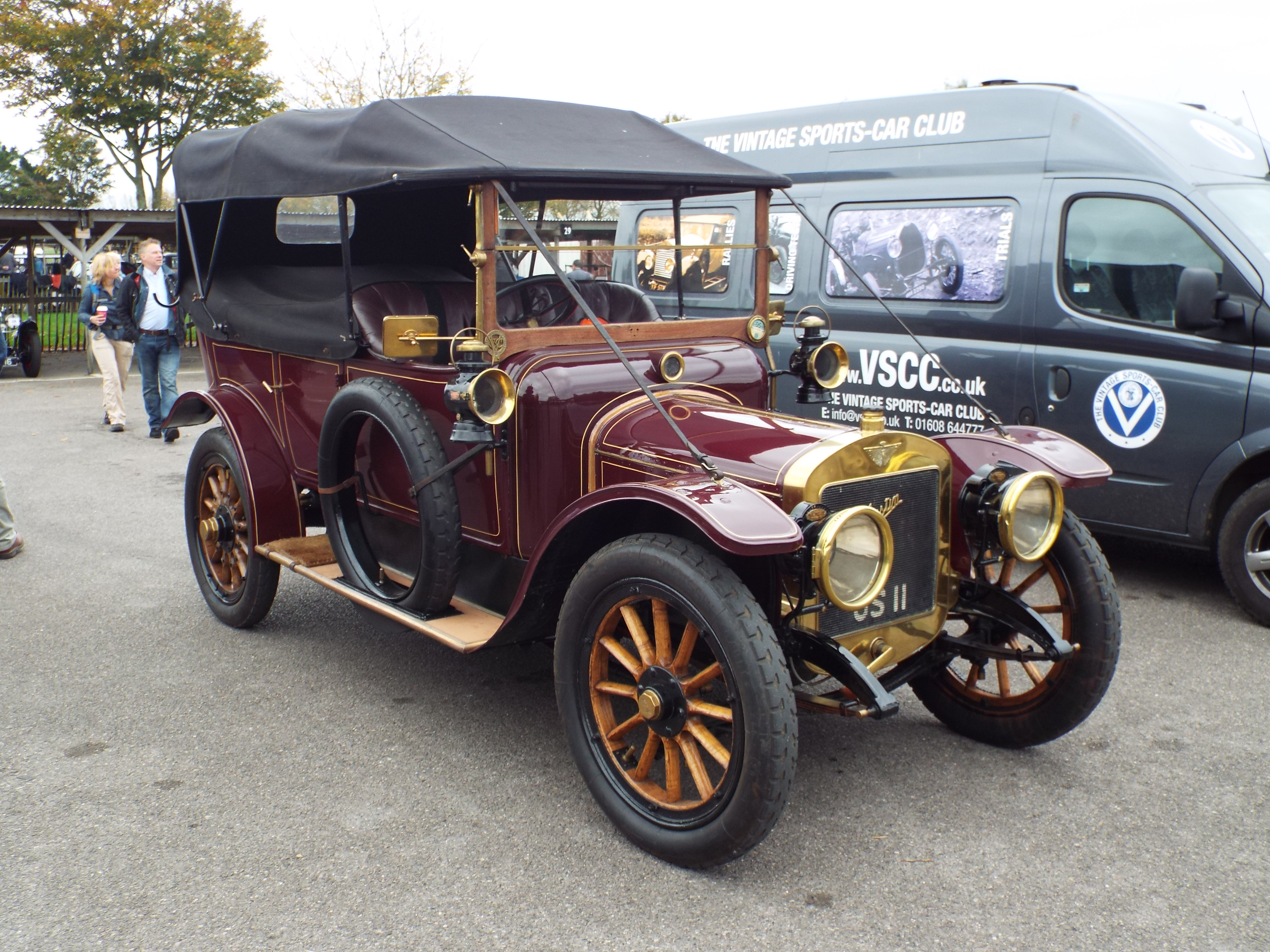
1911 tourer, car 963, engine 955

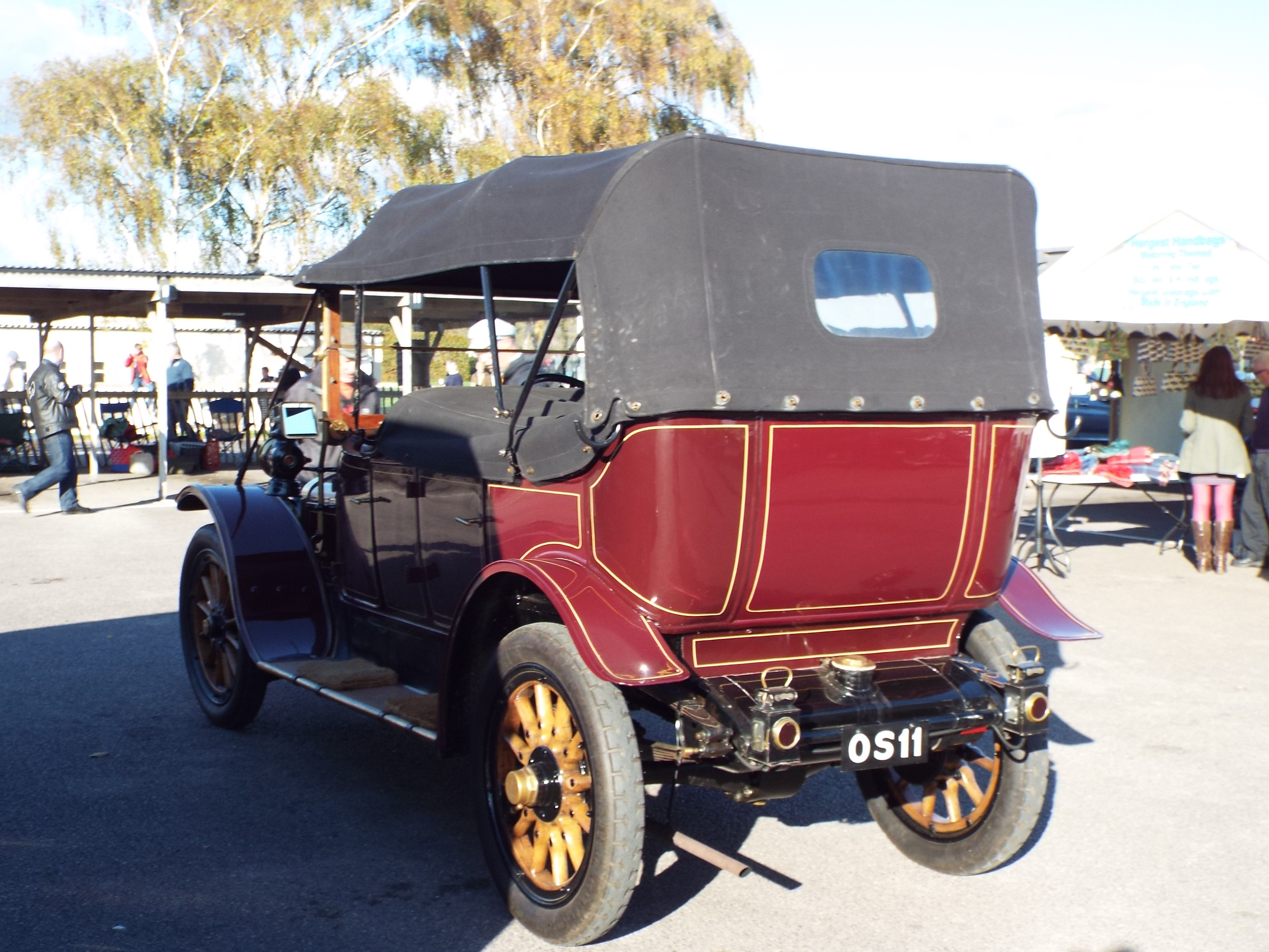

== Specification ==
The 18-24 began with the 32.8 tax horsepower 4-cylinder 5.3-litre engine intended for the 25-30 then the following year it was switched to the same 27.3 tax horsepower 4.4-litre (4 1/8 by 5 inches, 100 mm × 130 mm) engine as the short-lived 15–20. Finally the engine was enlarged to 30 tax horsepower and 4.8-litres (4 3/8 by 5 inches, 110 mm × 130 mm) for 1911.

Tax ratings 32.8 hp (24.5 kW), 27.3 hp (20.4 kW), 30 hp (22 kW).

There was a choice of wheelbase:

- 5.3-litres 1907: 10 ft 6 in (3.20 m)
- 4.4-litres 1908-1909: 9 ft 0 in (2.74 m) or 10 ft 6 in (3.20 m)
- 4.8-litres 1911-1913: 9 ft 11 in (3.02 m) or 10 ft 8 in (3.25 m)

The short wheel-base was sold as a two-seater Ranelagh (with dicky seat).

== Repute ==
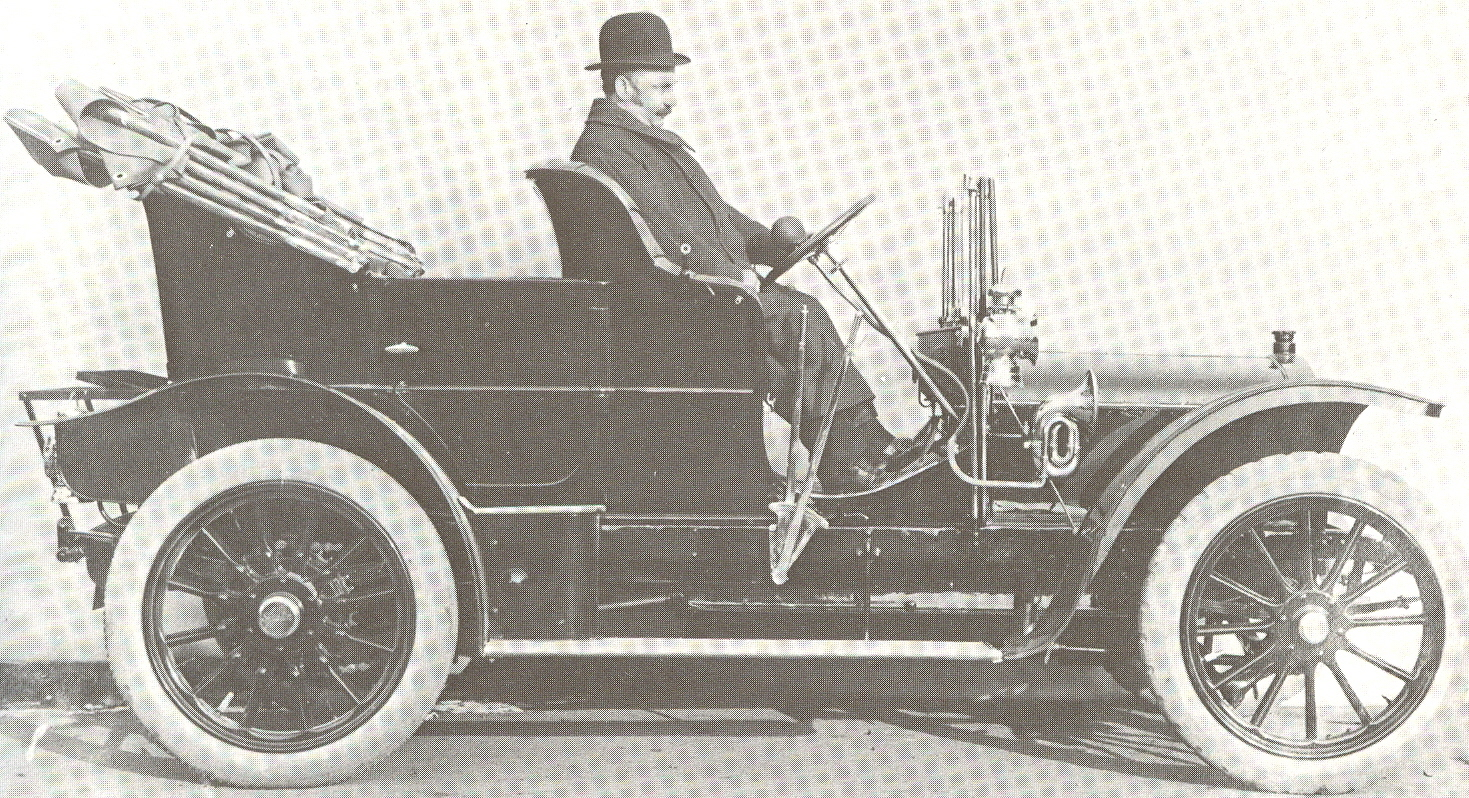
Herbert Austin at the wheel

The Motoring Correspondent of The Times wrote in June 1914:

Among the English firms who have built up a well-merited reputation with one particular type out of their range of models is the Austin Motor Company. For some years they have sold to the public a very sound vehicle in their 18 hp four-cylinder model. It may be said that the 18 hp Austin was one of the historic cars ranking in fame with the old 18 hp Mercedes, the 15 hp Panhard, the 40 hp Rolls-Royce and some others. This car varied slightly in certain details from year to year, but the main characteristics of the type were preserved for a considerable time. It had its faults, but its virtues were sufficiently positive to gain for it a place among the cars of repute.
