= Austin 30 hp =

Austin 30-hp
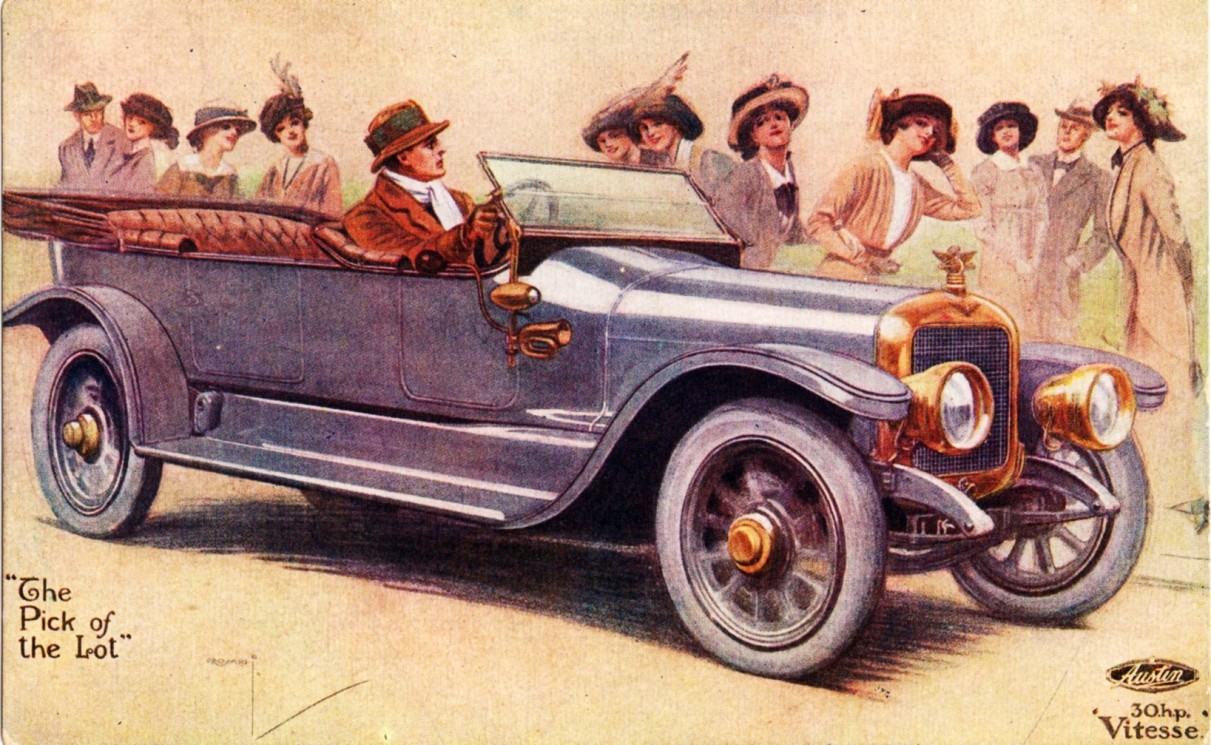
- Vitesse tourer 1914

Overview
- Manufacturer: Austin
- Production: 1912 – 1916
- Assembly: Longbridge, Northfield Birmingham

Powertrain
- Engine: 5,883 cc (359.0 cu in) I4; 6,077 cc (370.8 cu in) I4
- Transmission: clutch, 4-speed gearbox, propeller shaft within a torque tube, brake drum behind first universal joint

Dimensions
- Wheelbase: 129 in (3,276.6 mm) or; 138 in (3,505.2 mm); track 55 in (1,397.0 mm)
- Length: 171 in (4,343.4 mm) or; 180 in (4,572.0 mm)

Chronology
- Predecessor: Austin 18-24
- Successor: Austin 20

Austin 30 hp

Overview
- Manufacturer: Austin

Layout
- Displacement: 5,883 cc (359 cu in); 6,077 cc (371 cu in)
- Cylinder bore: 4 3/8 in (110 mm)
- Piston stroke: 6 in (150 mm); 6 1/4 in (160 mm)
- Valvetrain: sidevalves

Combustion
- Fuel system: Claudel carburettor
- Fuel type: petrol
- Oil system: pressure
- Cooling system: water

Output
- Power output: not reported Tax horsepower 30.56

Chronology
- Predecessor: Austin 18-24 5883 cc
- Successor: Austin 20 hp 3610 cc

The Austin 30-hp is a large luxury car that was announced by British car manufacturer Austin at the Paris Salon de l'Automobile in December 1912 where its chassis only was displayed. Austin's other exhibits were two other bare chassis, 10-hp and 20-hp respectively and a 40-hp Defiance tourer.

The new Austin 30 would go on to replace Austin's successful but aging 18-24 for 1914. It provided the basis for Austin's wartime armoured car.

== 1913 model ==
The 30 hp incorporated several technical innovations including:

- a torque tube encasing the propeller shaft so articulated that it can move freely with lateral movement of the back axle.
- a sub-frame for the engine clutch and gearbox at two points rigidly bolted to the front cross-member but resting at its back end in a circular rubber pad borne by the middle cross-member. This is to isolate the frame and body from noise from the gearbox and vibration from the other machinery.
- the brake drum is on the propeller shaft behind the universal joint, the drums and operating mechanism mounted on the forward end of the torque tube. The advantage is that the gear shaft and the front universal joint do not take the braking stresses. (By this time most manufacturers regarded transmission brakes obsolete)
- the lower portion of the double elliptic springs is slung beneath the back axle.
- the steering connections are in the form of pin joints rather than ball joints. In the event of breakage the joints will not come apart but the play would warn the driver without endangering car or occupants.

== Revision for 1914 ==
The Olympia Motor Show in November 1913 revealed the 30-hp would replace the 6-year-old 18-24 in Austin's catalogue.

The engine's stroke was lengthened (it was now 111 mm x 157 mm) which did not affect its tax rating but increased its cubic capacity to 6.077-litres.

Revised equipment includes a new suspension of the gearbox and the addition of a torque rod to the differential casing.

== Austin Armoured Car ==
The Austin 30 hp chassis formed the basis for the first Austin Armoured Car, used in World War I mainly by Russia.
