= List of Austin motor vehicles =

The Austin marque started with the Austin Motor Company, and survived a merger with the Nuffield Organization to form the British Motor Corporation, incorporation into the British Leyland Motor Corporation, nationalisation as British Leyland (BL) forming part of its volume car division Austin Morris later Austin Rover, and later privatisation as part of the Rover Group and was finally phased out as a brand in 1989.

== Model listing ==
Models are placed according to which era they were first produced, some models carried over between eras of the marque.

=== Pre World War I ===
data source

Model	Type of body	Cyl.	Disp.	Sold	From	To
25/30 hp	Open tourer Clément-Gladiator motorcar assembled for financier Du Cros with different ("Austin") radiator	4	5,182	67	1906	1907
15/20 hp		4	4,151	4	1906	1906
18/24 hp	Limousine, Phaeton, Cabriolet, s.w.b. Ranelagh 2-seater with dickey seat	4	4,399	1,575	1907	1913
40 hp	Endcliffe, York	4	5,843	152	1907	1913
60 hp		6	8,764	14	1908	1910
15 hp	Open tourer, 2-seater Ascot, 2-seater Harrogate with dickey seat, Town Carriage, Lancaster, Landaulettte	4	2,539	213	1908	1910
7 hp	built by Swift Motor Company: sold as Austin 162; Swift 868	1	1,099	162	1910	1911
50 hp		6	7,374	24	1910	1913
10 hp	Sirdar 4-seater phaeton	4	1,145	367	1911	1912
15 hp	as 15 hp above	4	2,838	688	1911	1915
18/24 hp		4	4,916	?	1911	1913
30 hp	Vitesse Phaeton	4	5884	425	1912	1916
40 hp	Vitesse	4	6,236		1912	1913
10 or 10/12 hp	Sirdar 4-seater phaeton	4	1,615	1,879	1913	1915
20 hp		4	3160	1,291	1913	1917

=== Inter-war ===
Model Name	Type of body	Cyl.	Disp.	Sold	From	To
Twenty	saloon, tourer, sports	4	3,610	15,287	1919	1930
Seven	saloon, fabric saloon, tourer, sports, coupé,	4	747	290,000	1922	1939
Twelve	Tourers: 5-str Clifton, Open Road, Harley All-Weather; 2-str Open Road, sports coupé Saloons: Burnham, Berkeley, Westminster, Windsor or fabric	4	1,660		1922	1926
Twelve; then from 1931— (Heavy) Twelve-Four	Tourers: 5-str Clifton, Open Road; 2-str Open Road, sports coupé Saloons: Burnham, Berkeley, Westminster, Windsor or fabric	4	1,861		1926	1939
Twenty	Carlton and Whitehall saloons (SWB); Ranelagh and Mayfair limousine and landaulette (LWB)	6	3,397		1927	1939
Sixteen; Light Six	Harrow two-seat tourer, Open Road tourer Saloons: Burnham, Berkeley, Westminster, fabric	6	2,249		1927	1936
London High Lot Taxicab	standard body built by Vincent or Strachan; Jones Bros £5 extra	4	1,861		1929	1934
Light Twelve-Six	Eton Two Seater, Open Road Tourer, Saloons: Harley, Ascot; Sports saloons: Kempton, Greyhound; sports tourer Newberry	6	1,496 or 1,711		1931	1937
Ten-Four	Clifton tourer, Lichfield, Sherborne and Cambridge saloons Colwyn cabriolet, sports tourer	4	1,125	290,000	1932	1947
Light Twelve-Four	Eton Two Seater, Open Road Tourer, Harley and Ascot saloons,	4	1,535	71,654	1933	1939
Sixteen 16 or 18 h.p.	Harrow two-seat tourer, Open Road tourer Saloons: Carlton, Iver, Berkeley, Westminster, York	6	2,249 or 2,510		1933	1938
London Low Loading Taxicab	standard body built by Vincent or Strachan; Jones Bros £5 extra	4	1,861		1934	1939
Fourteen	Goodwood saloon, cabriolet	6	1,711		1936	1939
Eighteen	Norfolk, Windsor and Iver saloons, Chalfont limousine	6	2,510	2,953	1938	1939
Eight	2-door and 4-door saloon, tourer	4	900	56,103	1939	1947
Twelve	saloon	4	1,535	8,600	1939	1947
~~Sixteen~~	~~saloon~~	~~4~~	~~2,199~~		~~1939~~	~~1947~~
London Flash Lot Taxicab	standard body built by Vincent or Strachan; Jones Bros £5 extra	4	1,861		1939	1939
Twenty Eight	Ranelagh saloon or limousine	6	4,016	300	1939	1939

=== Post World War II ===
Model Name	Type of body	Cyl.	Disp.	Sold	From	To
Austin 16 hp	4-door Saloon, Shooting Brake	4	2,199	35,434	1945	1949
A110 Sheerline	Saloon	6	3,460		1947	1947
A120 Princess	Saloon	6	3,460		1947	1947
A40 Devon/Dorset	2-door saloon, 4-door saloon, estate, van, pick-up	4	1,197	456,544	1947	1952
A125 Sheerline	Saloon, Touring Limousine	6	3,995		1947	1954
A135 Princess	Saloon, Touring Limousine	6	3,995		1947	1956
A90 Atlantic Convertible	4-seat convertible	4	2,660	7,981	1948	1950
A70 Hampshire	Saloon, estate	4	2,199	85,682	1948	1950
A90 Atlantic Saloon	2-door saloon	4	2,660		1949	1952
A70 Hereford	Saloon, estate, convertible	4	2,199		1950	1954
A40 Sports	4-seat convertible (Body by Jensen)	4	1,197	4011	1951	1953
A30	2-door saloon, 4-door saloon, estate	4	803	223,264	1951	1956

=== BMC era ===
1952 onwards

Model Name	Type of body	Cyl.	Disp.	Sold	From	To
A40 Somerset	4-door saloon, Convertible	4	1,197	173,306	1952	1954
Nash/Hudson/American/Austin Metropolitan	2-door coupe/convertible	4	1,197	13,825	1954	1955
Nash/Hudson/American/Austin Metropolitan	2-door coupe/convertible	4	1,489		1956	1961
A40 Cambridge	4-door saloon	4	1,197		1954	1956
A50 Cambridge	4-door saloon	4	1,489		1954	1957
A55 Cambridge Mk I	4-door saloon	4	1,489		1957	1958
A90 Six Westminster	4-door saloon	6	2,639	25,532	1954	1956
A35	2-door and 4-door saloon, Countryman, van, pickup	4	1,098	280,897	1956	1959
Princess IV	limousine	6	3,995	200	1956	1959
A95	4-door saloon, Countryman	6	2,639	28,065	1956	1959
A105	4-door saloon	6	2,639	6,770	1956	1959
A40 Farina Mk I	2-door saloon, Countryman	4	948	169,612	1958	1961
Lancer	4-door saloon (A product of BMC Australia)	4	1,489		1958	1962
A55 Cambridge Mk II	4-door saloon, Countryman	4	1,489	149,994	1959	1961
A99 Westminster	4-door saloon	6	2,912	15,162	1959	1961
Austin Gipsy	4wd 2-door	4	2,199	21,208	1959	1967
A60 Cambridge (Australia)	4-door saloon, 5-door "Countryman" wagon (A product of BMC Australia - re-engined A55 Cambridge Mk II)	4	1,622		1959	1962
Seven (Mini)	2-door saloon, Countryman (name changed from Austin Seven to Austin Mini in 1961)	4	848		1959	1961
Mini	2-door saloon, Countryman (name changed from Austin Seven to Austin Mini in 1961 and then sold under the Mini marque from 1969)	4	848; 997; 998; 1,071; 1,275		1961	1969
A40 Farina Mk II	2-door saloon, Countryman	4	1,098	172,550	1962	1967
A110 Westminster	4-door saloon	6	2,912	26,105	1961	1968
A60 Cambridge	4-door saloon, Countryman	4	1,622	276,534	1961	1969
Freeway	4-door saloon, 5-door station wagon (A product of BMC Australia)	6	2,433		1962	1965
1100	2-door and 4-door saloon, Countryman	4	1,098		1963	1974
1800 (ADO17)	4-door saloon (Austin Balanza in Belgium and the Netherlands)	4	1,798	221,000	1964	1975
Mini Moke	4 seat convertible	4			1964	1968

=== British Leyland (BL) ===
(Austin Morris, Leyland Cars, Austin Morris (reformed)) 1967–1982

Model Name	Type of body	Cyl.	Disp.	Sold	From	To
1300	4-door saloon, 2-door estate car	4	1,275		1967	1974
3-Litre	4-door saloon	6	2,912	9,992	1967	1971
11/55	4-door saloon (South African market variant of Austin 1100)	4	1,100		1968	?
Maxi	4-door hatchback	4	1,485		1969	1981
Maxi	4-door hatchback	4	1,748		1969	1981
1500	4-door saloon (Export name for Australian Morris 1500)	4	1,485		1969?	
Nomad	5-door hatchback (Export name for Australian Morris Nomad)	4	1,485		1969?	
Tasman/Kimberley	4-door saloon (Australia and New Zealand only)	6	2,227		1970	1974
Apache	4-door saloon (Produced by British Leyland Motor Corporation's South African subsidiary, Leykor)	4	1,275	21,655	1971	1978
2200 (ADO17)	4-door saloon (Austin Balanza in Belgium and the Netherlands)	6	2,227		1972	1975
Allegro	4-door saloon, 2-door estate	4	998		1981	1982
Allegro	4-door saloon, 2-door estate	4	1,098		1973	1981
Allegro	4-door saloon, 2-door estate	4	1,275		1973	1982
Allegro	4-door saloon, 2-door estate	4	1,485		1973	1982
Allegro	4-door saloon, 2-door estate	4	1,748		1973	1982
Marina	4-door saloon, 2-door coupe (The Morris Marina was sold as the Austin Marina in certain export markets)	4; 6	1,275; 1,748; 1,798; 2,622		1973	1979
1800 (ADO71)	4-door saloon. Sold as the Austin 1800 from March to September 1975 and then as the Princess 1800 through to 1978	4	1,798		1975	1975
2200 (ADO71)	4-door saloon. Sold as the Austin 2200 from March to September 1975 and then as the Princess 2200 through to 1981	4	2,226		1975	1975

=== BL / Rover Group ===
(Austin Rover) 1982 to 1988

Model Name	Type of body	Cyl.	Disp.	Sold	From	To
Metro	2-door or 4-door hatchback	4	1.0/1.3	2,078,218	1980	1990
Ambassador	4-door hatchback	4	1.7/2.0	43,427	1982	1984
Maestro	4-door hatchback	4	1.3 - 2.0		1983	1994
Montego	4-door saloon, estate	4	1.3 - 2.0	569,000	1984	1994

== Commercial vehicles ==
=== London taxicabs ===
Complying with London Metropolitan Police Area (and Heathrow) regulations
also non-compliant hire car variants.

Model name	Type of body	Cyl.	Disp.	Sold	From	To
London HL "High Lot" Taxicab	Heavy Twelve-Four hire-car chassis amended to comply Reg.s; Coachwork arranged to suit customer by Mann & Overton	4	1,861		1930	1935
London LL "Low Loading" Taxicab	as above but using dropped cross-braced chassis of new Light Twelve-Six but still using Heavy Twelve engine etc.	4	1,861		1934	1939
London FL "Flash Lot" Taxicab	as above but with raked windscreen and rounded radiator of rest of Austin range first introduced in 1934	4	1,861		1939	1940
Metropolitan Taxicab FX3 or FX3D	as above but new all-steel body built by Carbodies in Coventry and using the A70 petrol engine From 1954 an Austin diesel engine was available alongside the petrol engine	4	2,199 (petrol) 2,178 (diesel)		1948	1958
Austin FL1 hire car	Private hire version of FX3	4	2,199 (petrol) 2,178 (diesel)		1948	1958
London Taxicab FX4	The classic Black cab (Hackney carriage); All steel body made by Carbodies on a chassis supplied by Austin in Adderley Park, Birmingham. Powered by a 2.2 litre diesel or 2.2 litre petrol, until 1972, when the petrol engine was dropped and the diesel engine capacity increased to 2.5 litres. Chassis plant moved to Carbodies in 1972. Carbodies acquired the intellectual rights to the vehicle in 1982, from which time it was sold as the Carbodies FX4.	4	2,199 (petrol) 2,178 or 2,520 (diesel)		1958	1982
FL2 hire car	Private hire version of FX4	4	2,199 (petrol) 2,178 or 2,520 (diesel)		1958	1978

=== Car-based commercials ===
- Austin 6cwt/8cwt (re-badged Morris Minor) 1953–1971
- Austin A30 van 1954–1956
- Austin A35 van 1956–1968
- Austin A55 and A60 van 1958–1972
- Austin A40 van and pick-up
- Austin Mini van 1960–1982 and pick-up 1961–1982
- Austin 1800 Utility (Australia only) 1968–1971
- Austin Metro van 1982–1990
- Austin Maestro van 1985–1994

=== Light commercials ===
- Austin K8 "Three Way" 1947–1954
- Austin LD 1954–1967
- Austin 152/J2 1956–1967
- Austin 101 1957–1961 "badge engineered" version of Morris JB
- Austin J4 1960–1968
- Austin Morris 250 JU 1967–1974
- Austin Morris EA 1968–1984

=== Lorries ===
- Austin 30cwt truck (1919–1923)
- Austin 2 ton (1913)
- Austin 702 7 ton
- Austin K30 30cwt truck (1939–1941)
- Austin K2 (Jan 1939 to 1949) 2 ton short wheelbase and long wheelbase
- Austin K3 (1939 to 1945) 3 ton long wheelbase
- Austin K4 (1939 to 1949) 5 ton
- Austin K2 Series II Loadstar (1949–1955) 2 ton
- Austin K4 Series II Loadstar (1949–1956) 5 ton

After formation of BMC in 1952 vehicles based on both Austin and Morris designs were largely available with either Austin or Morris badges, the exception being the largest truck (the 7 tonner) which was badged BMC. The forward control trucks being based on the Morris trucks that came before, and the normal control vehicles being based on the Loadstar design, (see also Morris WE).

- Austin 301 (rebadged Morris Commercial LC5) 1953–57
- Morris WE/Austin S203/S403/S503 (1955–1964) 2ton/4ton/5ton
- Morris WF/Austin S303/S403/S503 (1964–1968) 3ton/4ton/5ton
- Austin FV Series II (1954–1955) Morris forward control truck badged Austin
- Austin FE Series III (1955–1959) Morris forward control truck badged Austin
- Austin FF (also sold as Austin 45 and Morris FF) 1958–61
- Austin FG (also sold as 404 and S200) 1960–1968
- Austin FH (1961–64)
- Austin FJ (1964–68)

=== Military ===
- Austin K2/Y 1939-1945 Ambulance
- Austin K3 1939-1945 3-ton
- Austin K4 Tanker, Dropside, Fire
- Austin K5 1941–1945
- Austin K6 1942–1945
- Austin Champ 1947–56
- Austin K9 1952–1955
