= FL1 =

FL1, FL-1, or similar may refer to:

- FL1 (Lazio regional railways)
- Florida's 1st congressional district, a congressional district in the U.S. state of Florida
- Florida State Road A1A, formerly Florida State Road 1
- Football League One, the second-highest division of The Football League and third-highest division overall in the English football league system
- a technical standard for the rating of flashlights
- a model of the Chinese Silkworm (missile)
- a taxicab, one of the List of Austin motor vehicles
