= Gumdrop (book series) =

Children's book series by Val Biro

The real-life Gumdrop in 2008

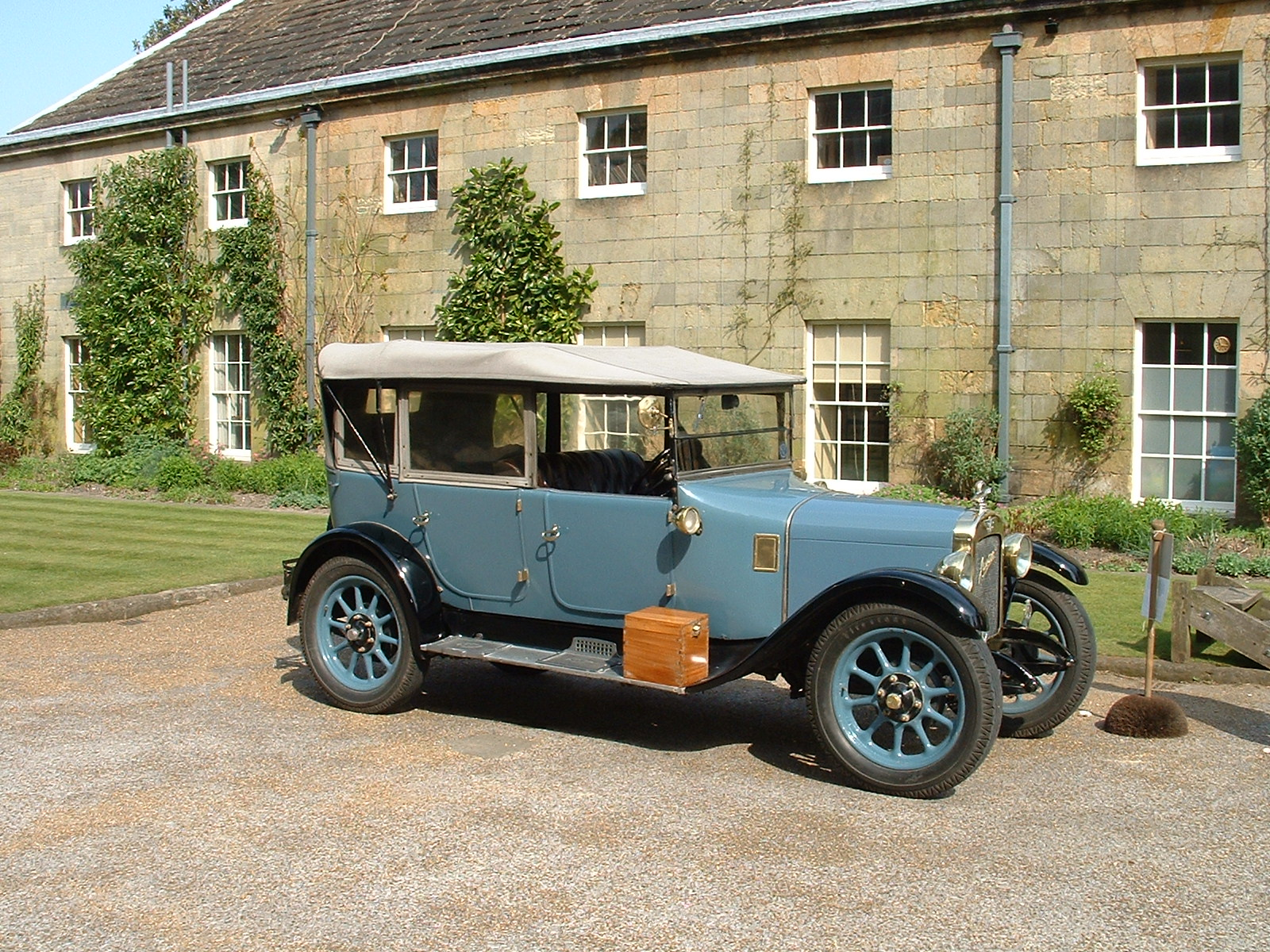
Gumdrop in 2003

The Gumdrop stories are a series of 37 children's books written and illustrated by Val Biro. They concern a 1926 Austin 12 hp four cylinder (Austin Clifton twelve four) called "Gumdrop", who gets involved in various adventures. The car is real and was in the author's possession, but the stories are fictional. The first book was The Adventures of a Vintage Car (1966) and the last was Gumdrop's School Adventure (2001). His adventures have included such tales as an encounter with the Loch Ness Monster where Gumdrop and his owner helped to protect the monster being exploited for publicity, a meeting with Father Christmas where Gumdrop helped him deliver presents, and helping an elephant escape an abusive zookeeper and deliver him to a safari park which they soon help to rescue from being destroyed by bulldozers. Given Gumdrop's age, various stories feature a sub-plot of his owners needing to find replacement parts for him as certain components become worn out over time, ranging from a new starter to a complete replacement of his engine, often made more difficult by the fact that these parts are no longer being manufactured directly.

A television series of the same name and based on the original books was produced in the 1990s and narrated by Nigel Planer.

== Titles ==
Number	Published	Title
1	1966	Gumdrop - Adventures of a Vintage Car
2	1967	Gumdrop and the Farmer's Friend
3	1968	Gumdrop on the Rally
4	1969	Gumdrop on the Move
5	1971	Gumdrop Goes to London
6	1973	Gumdrop Finds a Friend
7	1975	Gumdrop in Double Trouble
TV	1976	Gumdrop and the Steamroller TV
L1	1976	Gumdrop and the Steamroller
L2	1976	Gumdrop Posts a Letter
8	1976	Gumdrop on the Brighton Run
9	1977	Gumdrop Has a Birthday
10	1979	Gumdrop Gets His Wings
Ann1	1979	Gumdrop Annual 1
Ann2	1980	Gumdrop Annual 2
11	1980	Gumdrop Finds a Ghost
12	1981	Gumdrop and the Secret Switches
13	1982	Gumdrop at Sea
14	1982	Gumdrop Makes a Start
L3	1982	Gumdrop and Horace
L4	1982	Gumdrop Races a Train
L5	1976	Gumdrop Goes to School
L6	1983	Gumdrop Gets a Lift
L7	1983	Gumdrop at the Zoo
L8	1983	Gumdrop in a Hurry
L9	1984	Gumdrop Goes Fishing
L10	1984	Gumdrop Has a Tummy-Ache
L11	1984	Gumdrop is the Best Car
L12	1984	Gumdrop On the Farm
15	1984	Gumdrop's Magic Journey
16	1985	Gumdrop and the Monster
17	1986	Gumdrop to the Rescue
18	1988	Gumdrop and the Dinosaur
19	1989	Gumdrop and the Pirates
Omn	1989	Gumdrop Omnibus
20	1990	Gumdrop and the Elephant
21	1991	Gumdrop and the Bulldozers
22	1991	Gumdrop for Ever!
23	1992	Gumdrop's Merry Christmas
24	1998	Gumdrop and the Martians
25	2001	Gumdrop's School Adventure
