= Austin 12 =

Austin Twelve 1660 cc & 1861 cc
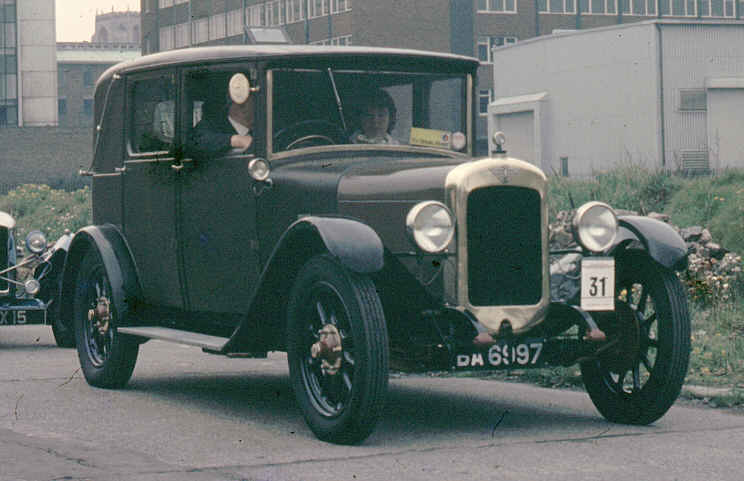
- Twelve (wide track) with fabric saloon body c. 1928

Overview
- Manufacturer: Austin
- Production: 1921–1939; 88,000

Body and chassis
- Body style: catalogued: tourer, saloon, sports coupé, Harley all-weather tourer, fabric saloon special chassis for various—hire car, taxi, London taxi, van and other commercials

Powertrain
- Engine: 1660 or 1861 cc Straight-4
- Transmission: single-plate clutch, 4-speed centrally controlled gearbox, linked by disc coupling to the open propeller shaft, by metal universal joint to a helical bevel-driven live rear axle. The clutch housing is cast in one with the gearbox.

Dimensions
- Wheelbase: 9' 4", 112 in (2,800 mm); Track 4' 4", 52 in (1,300 mm); 4' 8", 56 in (1,400 mm)
- Length: 13' 6", 162 in (4,100 mm)
- Width: 5' 3", 63 in (1,600 mm)
- Kerb weight: Chassis 16¼ cwt, 1,820 lb (830 kg) tourer 22 cwt, 2,464 lb (1,118 kg) saloon 24 cwt, 2,688 lb (1,219 kg)

Chronology
- Predecessor: Austin Ten-Twelve
- Successor: Austin 12/4

Austin Twelve engine 1660
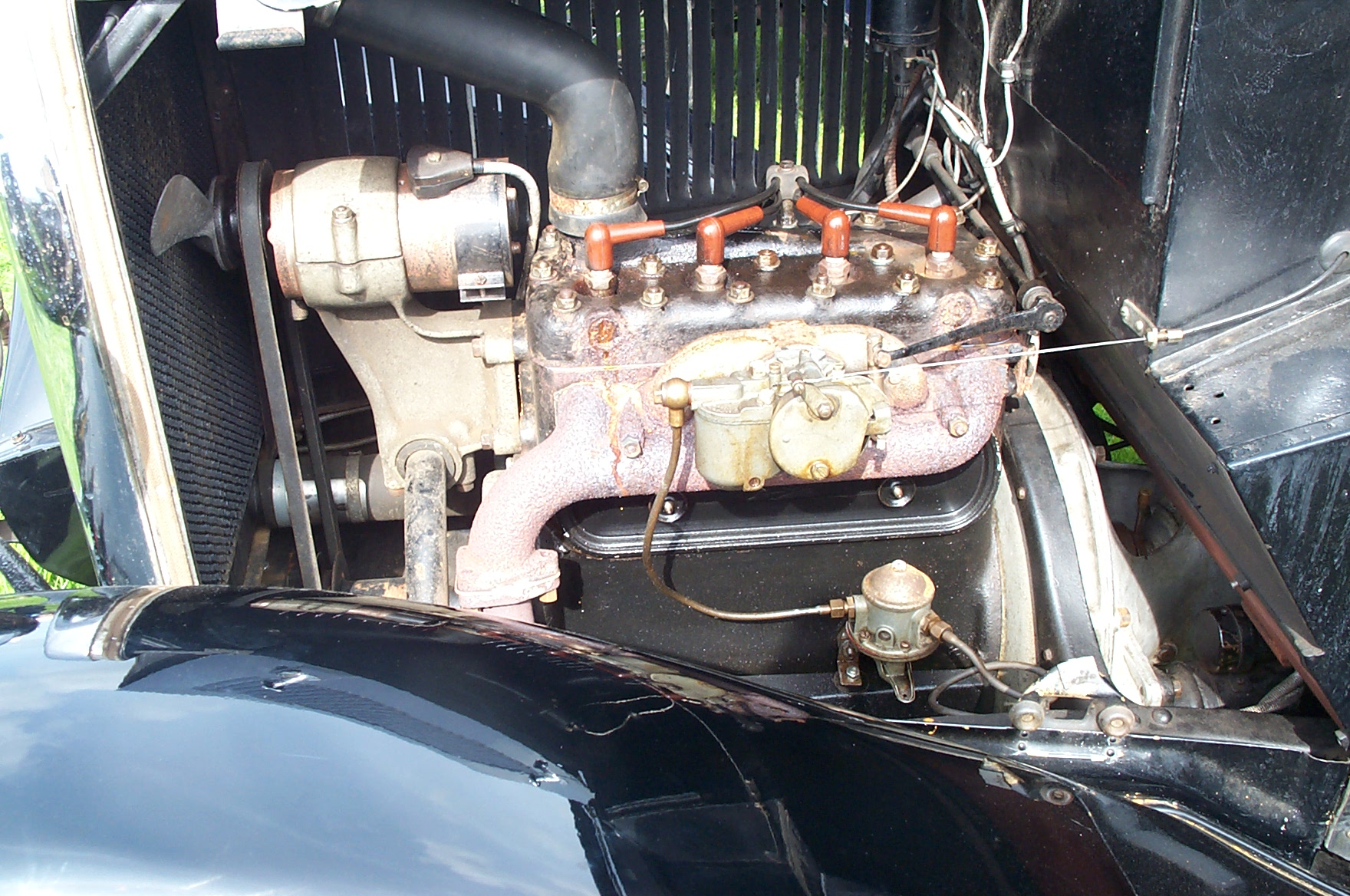

Overview
- Manufacturer: Austin

Layout
- Configuration: Straight 4-cylinder
- Displacement: 1,660 cc (101 cu in)
- Cylinder bore: 72 mm (2.8 in)
- Piston stroke: 102 mm (4.0 in)
- Cylinder block material: Cast iron, alloy crankcase.
- Cylinder head material: Detachable, pistons are aluminium
- Valvetrain: Side-by-side valves, tappet covers may be easily removed, timing is driven by chain

Combustion
- Fuel system: Single carburettor supplied by a vacuum tank which draws from a reservoir beneath the driver's seat, ignition by magneto driven by chain placed behind the timing, dynamo driven by same chain
- Management: Back seat
- Fuel type: Petrol
- Oil system: lubrication by forced feed, filler on the offside
- Cooling system: Radiator, fan, cooling water is circulated by a pump forward of the timing on the nearside

Output
- Power output: 20 bhp (15 kW; 20 PS) @2,000 rpm Tax horsepower 12.8

Chronology
- Successor: Austin Twelve 1861 cc

Austin Twelve engine 1861

Overview
- Manufacturer: Austin
- Production: Unknown

Layout
- Configuration: Straight 4-cylinder
- Displacement: 1,861 cc (114 cu in)
- Cylinder bore: 72 mm (2.8 in)
- Piston stroke: 114.5 mm (4.51 in)

Output
- Power output: 27 bhp (20 kW; 27 PS) @2,000 rpm Tax horsepower 12.8

Chronology
- Predecessor: Austin Twelve 1660 cc
- Successor: Austin Twelve 1535 cc, 1946

The Austin Twelve is a motor car introduced by Austin in 1921. It was the second of Herbert Austin's post World War I models and was in many ways a scaled-down version of his Austin Twenty, introduced in 1919. The slower-than-expected sales of the Twenty brought about this divergence from his intended one-model policy. The Twelve was announced at the beginning of November 1921 after Austin's company had been in receivership for six months. The number twelve refers to its fiscal horse power (12.8) rather than its brake horsepower (bhp) which was initially 20 bhp (1660 cc engine), and later 27 bhp (1861 cc engine). The long-stroke engines encouraged by the tax regime, 72 × 102 mm later 72 × 114.5 mm, had much greater low-speed torque than the bhp rating suggests.

== Overview ==
Initially available as a tourer, by 1922 three body styles were offered: the four-seat tourer, the two/four-seater (both at 550 GBP) and the coupé at 675 GBP.

The car enjoyed success throughout the vintage era with annual sales peaking at 14,000 in 1927.

While the mechanical specification changed little (the engine increased from 1661 cc to 1861 cc in 1926), many body styles were offered with saloons becoming more popular as the twenties drew to a close.

The car continued in the Austin catalogue and as a taxi option until 1939. The last cars were produced for the War Department in 1940.

After the early thirties the car was referred to by the public as the Heavy Twelve to distinguish it from the other, newer, 12 tax horsepower cars in the Austin catalogue Light Twelve-Four, Light Twelve-Six etc. and received some updating. The artillery style wheels were replaced by wire wheels in 1933 and coil ignition replaced the magneto in 1935. The gearbox was provided with synchromesh between its top two ratios in 1934. The factory catalogued body range was steadily updated with the last of the no longer fashionable Weymann style fabric-covered cars in 1931 and no open tourers after 1934.

After the war the Austin Twelve name resumed in the Austin catalogue for a couple of years until the arrival in 1947 of the Austin A40 Dorset and Devon saloons.

Today, the Austin Twelve is remembered as being virtually unburstable and is well catered for by the Vintage Austin Register in the UK and various other clubs in other parts of the world.

== Chassis ==
"The gears were easily changed, the brakes worked well, yet were smooth in application, and the steering is steady and light. Ample lock enables the car to turn in a small space. Of the springing I have no complaint; much of its efficiency is probably due to proper lubrication of the leaves. The various controls are to hand, and in addition to a horn button on the instrument board there is a large circular switch on the steering wheel so that warning can be given without having to take off a hand." from the report on the Austin Twelve Harley all-weather tourer published February 1924.

=== Pricing ===
- Hertford 4-cylinder £355
- Clifton 4-cylinder £355
- Harley 4-cylinder £475
- Berkeley 4-cylinder £475
- Windsor 4-cylinder £475

=== Brakes ===
A pedal operates shoes in enclosed drums at the rear and a centrally set hand lever applies a locomotive type of transmission brake which is anchored to the gear box. Hand adjusters are provided. Compensation is given by rubber washers. The rear-wheel brakes can also be taken up by hand on the primary rod.

==== Four-wheel brakes ====
This "very marked improvement" was announced for the Motor Show October 1924. The pedal now applied all four brakes on the wheels. Application was by cable, the sets were compensated and wear could be taken up individually.
The carburettor was now given a strangler. The handbrake worked on the transmission for parking.

=== Steering ===
Steering gear is by worm and worm wheel.

=== Suspension ===
Suspension is by half-elliptical springs, those at the rear are underslung. Gaiters allowing leaf lubrication by oil are fitted, and such parts as shackle pins are greased by gun.

1926 Heavy Twelve Clifton tourer

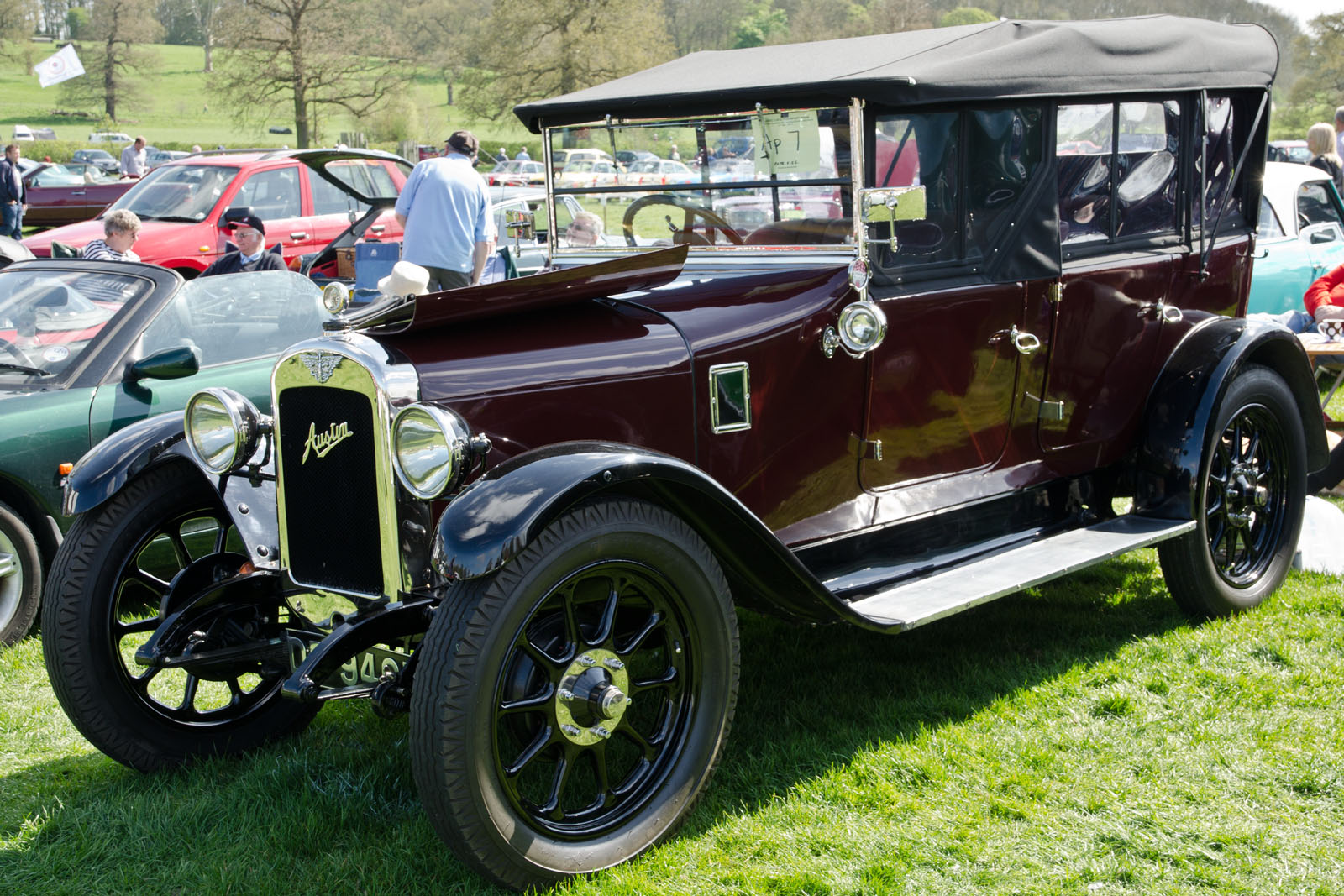

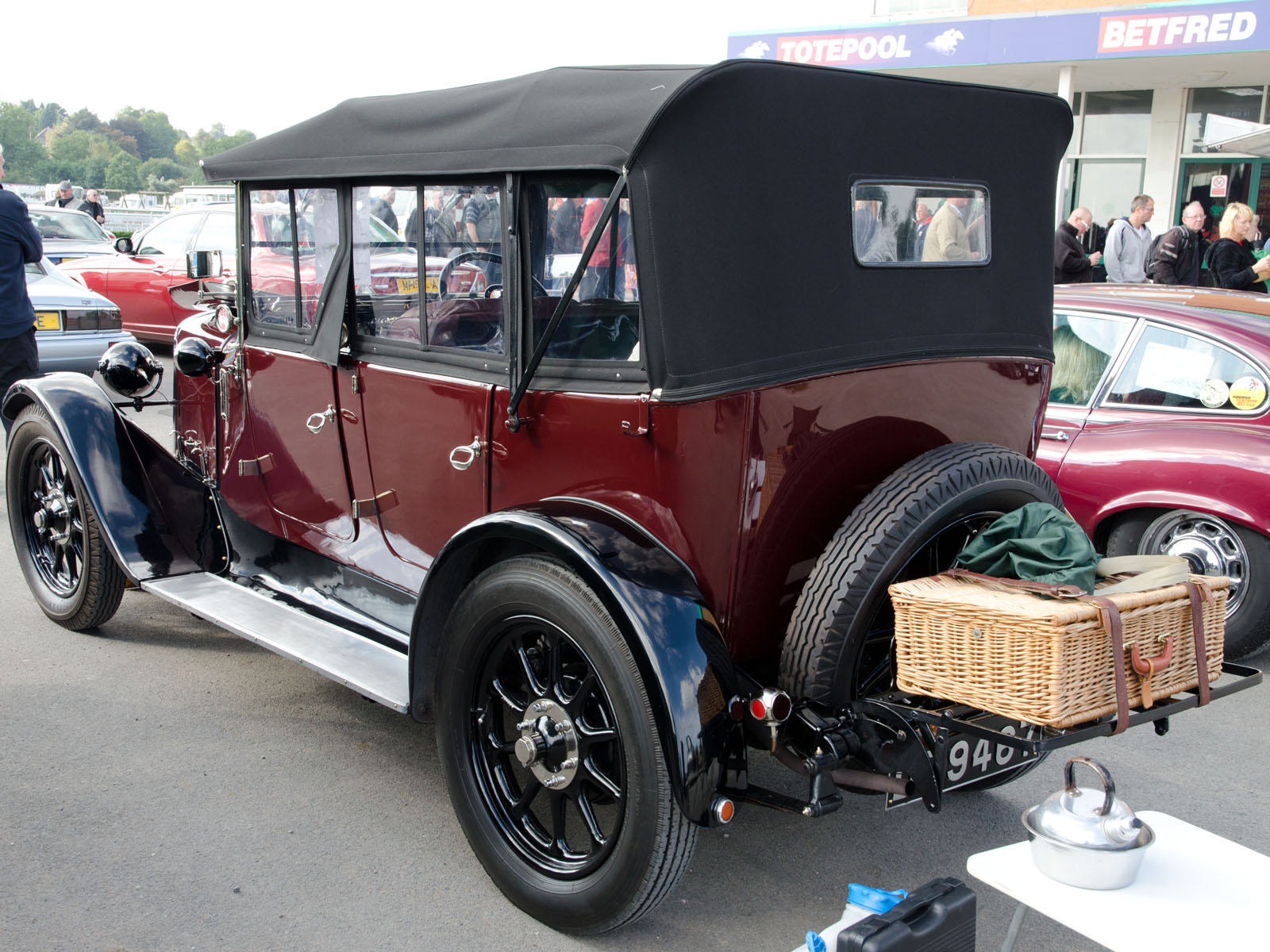

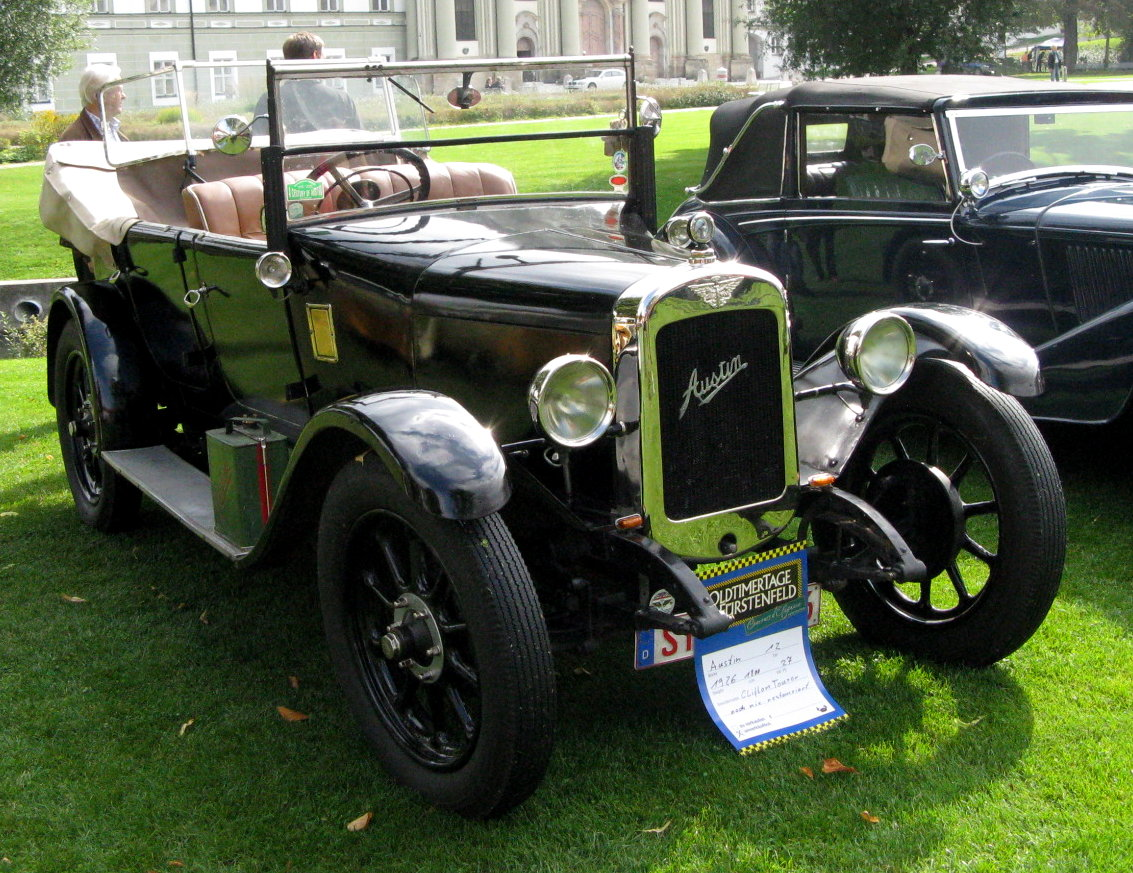
1930s Twelve-Four Ascots

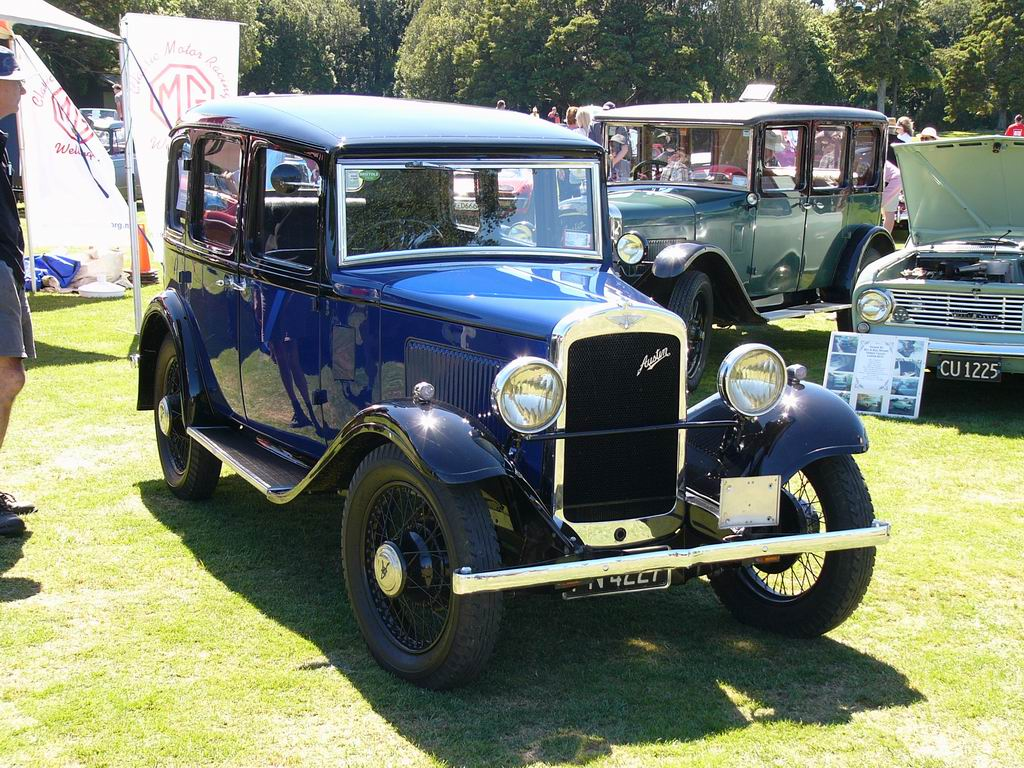
1933

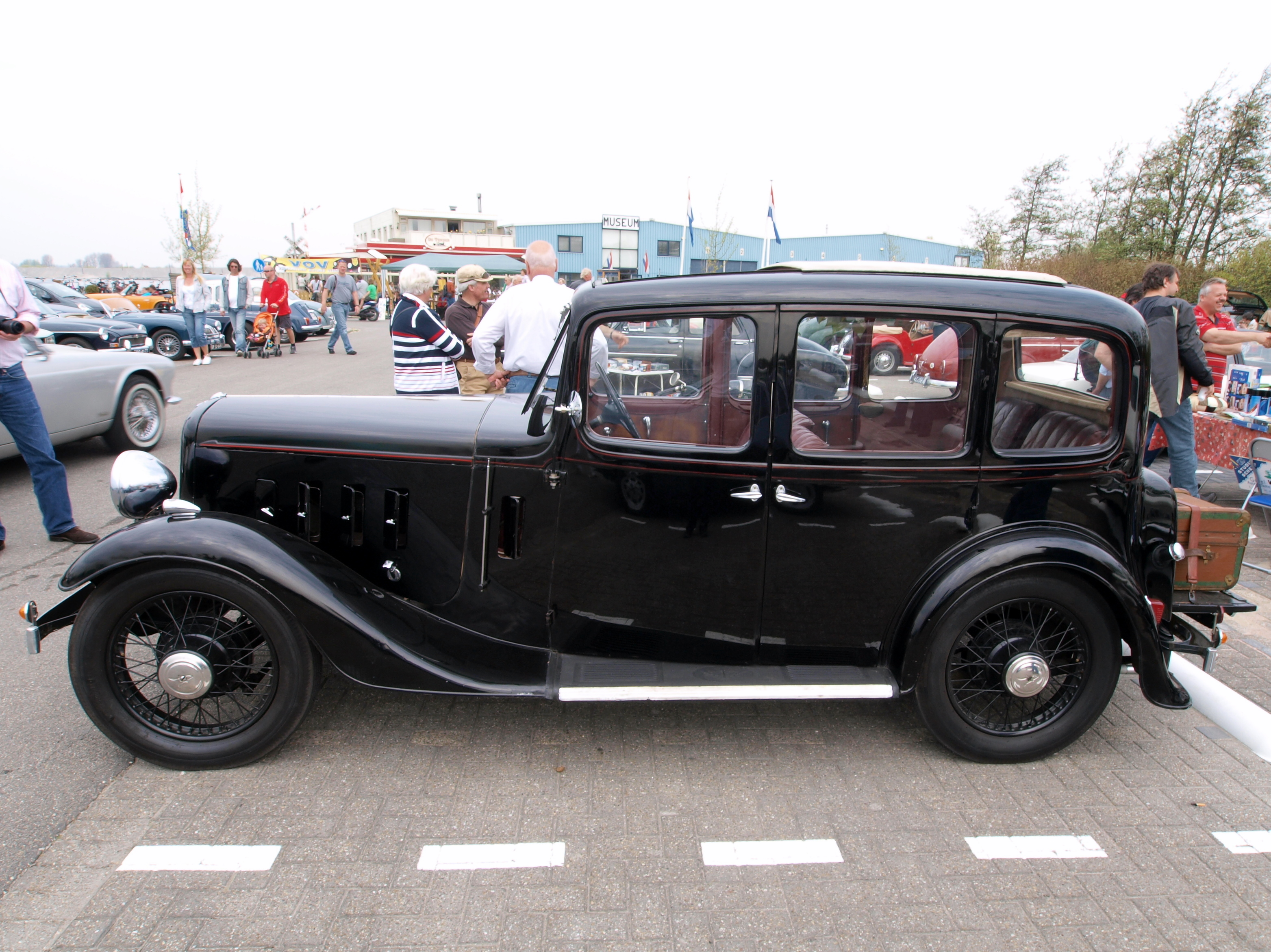
1935

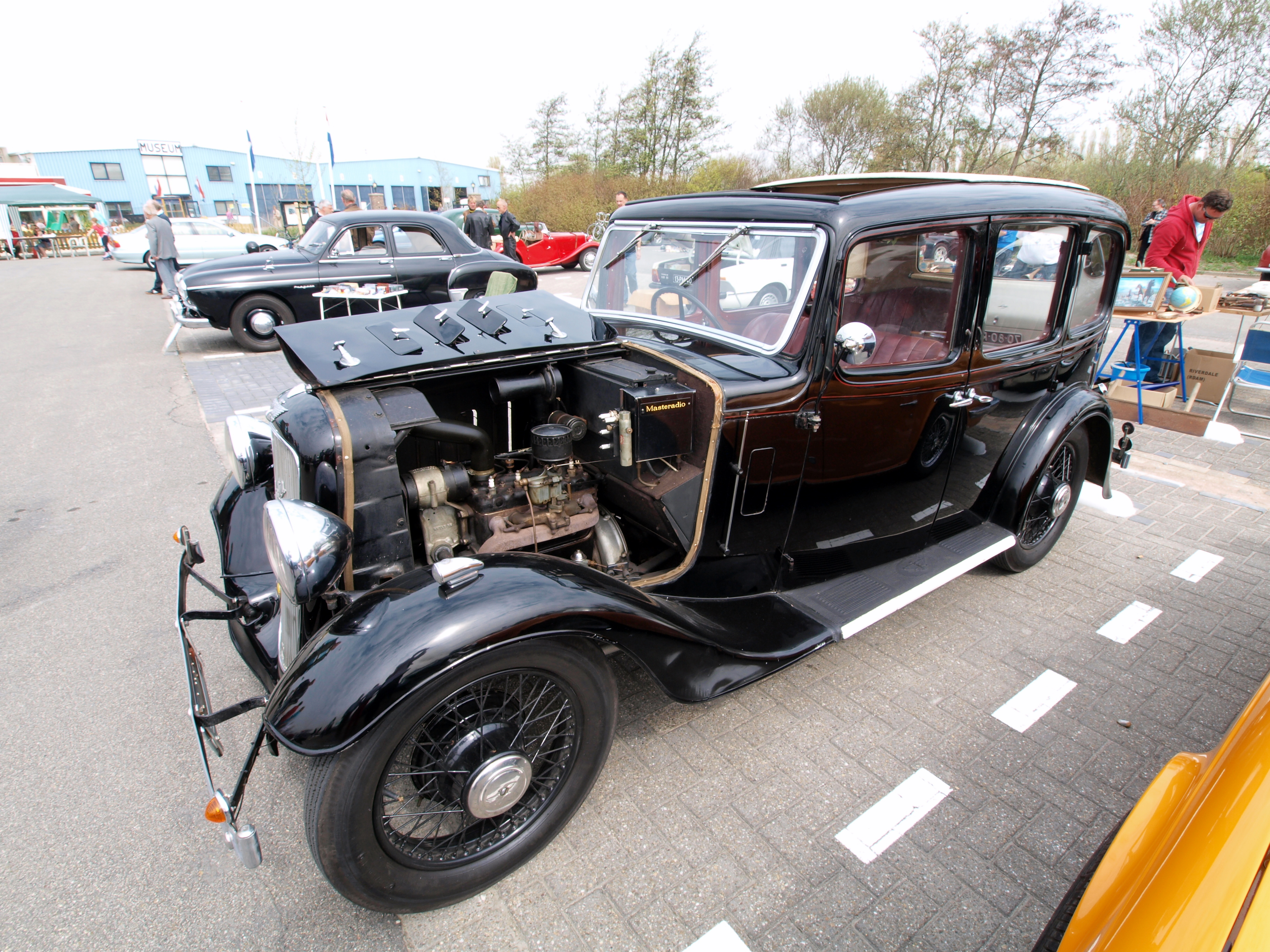
1935 wireless

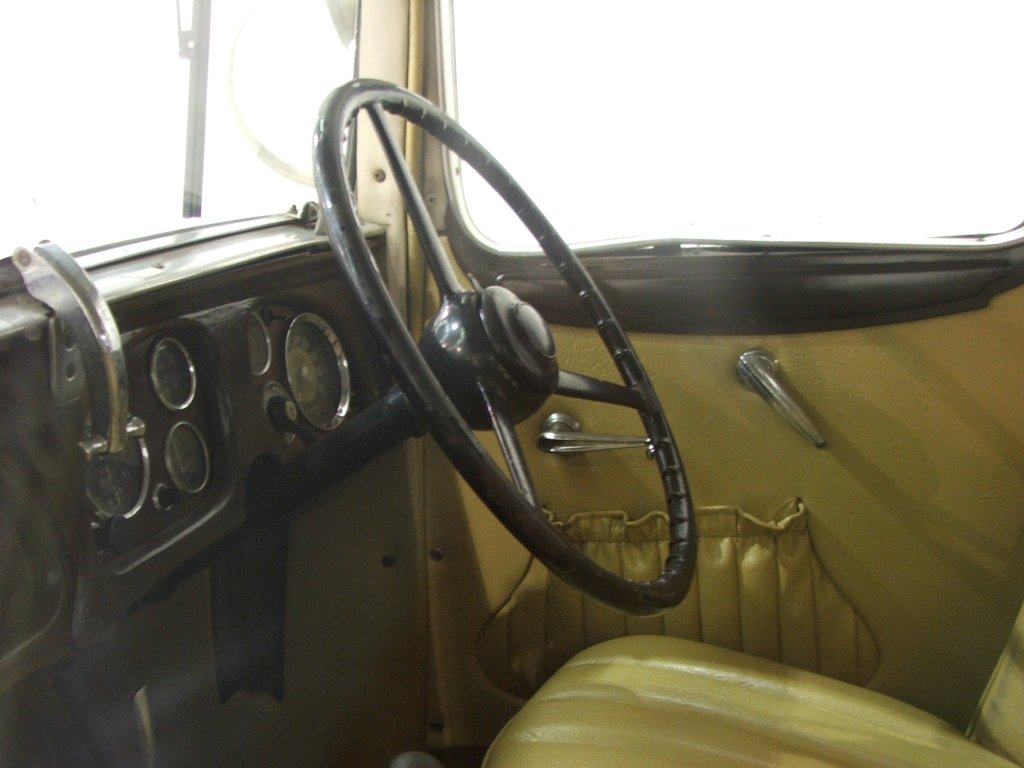
1936

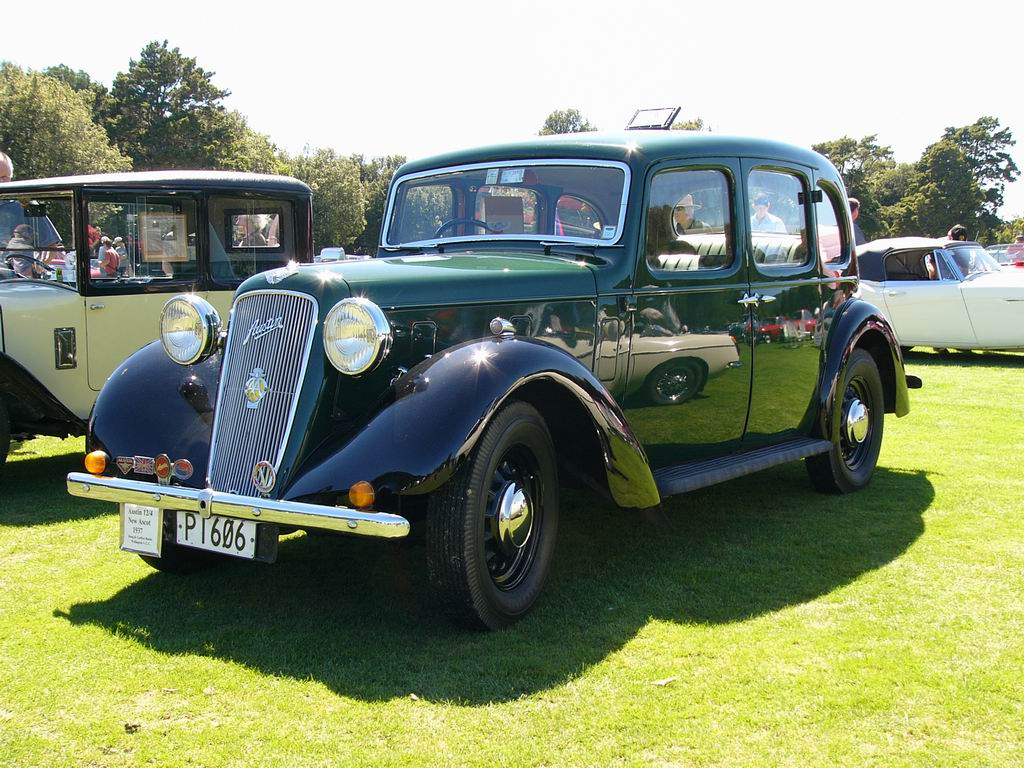
1937
1938–39 Twelve Ascot

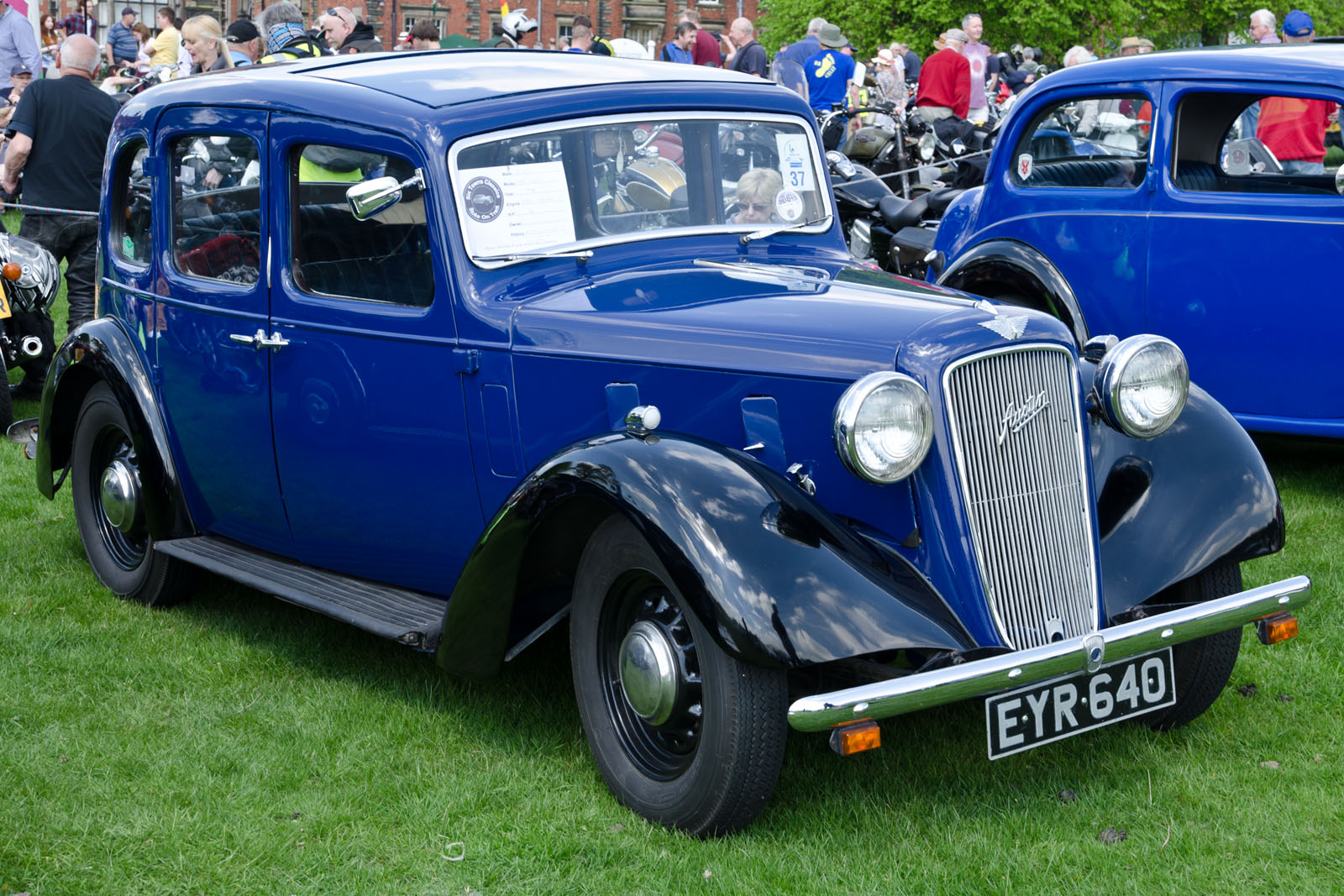
Higher and wider doors

== In fiction ==
The real-life Gumdrop as driven by the author on 27 July 2008

The Twelve-Four is familiar to children in the form of Gumdrop, the title character of a series of books authored by Val Biro, who owned an example. Gumdrop is an Austin Clifton Heavy Twelve-Four of 1926.

The stories revolve around the car and his owner, initially the younger Bill McArran, but for most of the series, the more senior Mr Oldcastle (later joined by a dog, Horace). The plots often involve the search for replacement parts for Gumdrop.

Biro wrote the stories from the late 1960s to the 1980s. The main series of books, all fully illustrated in colour by Biro, ran to at least seventeen titles, with a further twelve (at least) "Gumdrop Little Books" also published in the 1980s.

Whilst Gumdrop's adventures are fictional, the car is not. Mr Biro and Gumdrop were frequent visitors to car shows and other events in Sussex and surrounding area (2008)

== Centenary ==
In 2022 the Heavy 12/4 celebrated 100 years, with the Vintage Austin Register hosting a commemorative event in Leicestershire featuring a gathering of one hundred cars.
