= Austin 10 hp =

Austin 10-hp
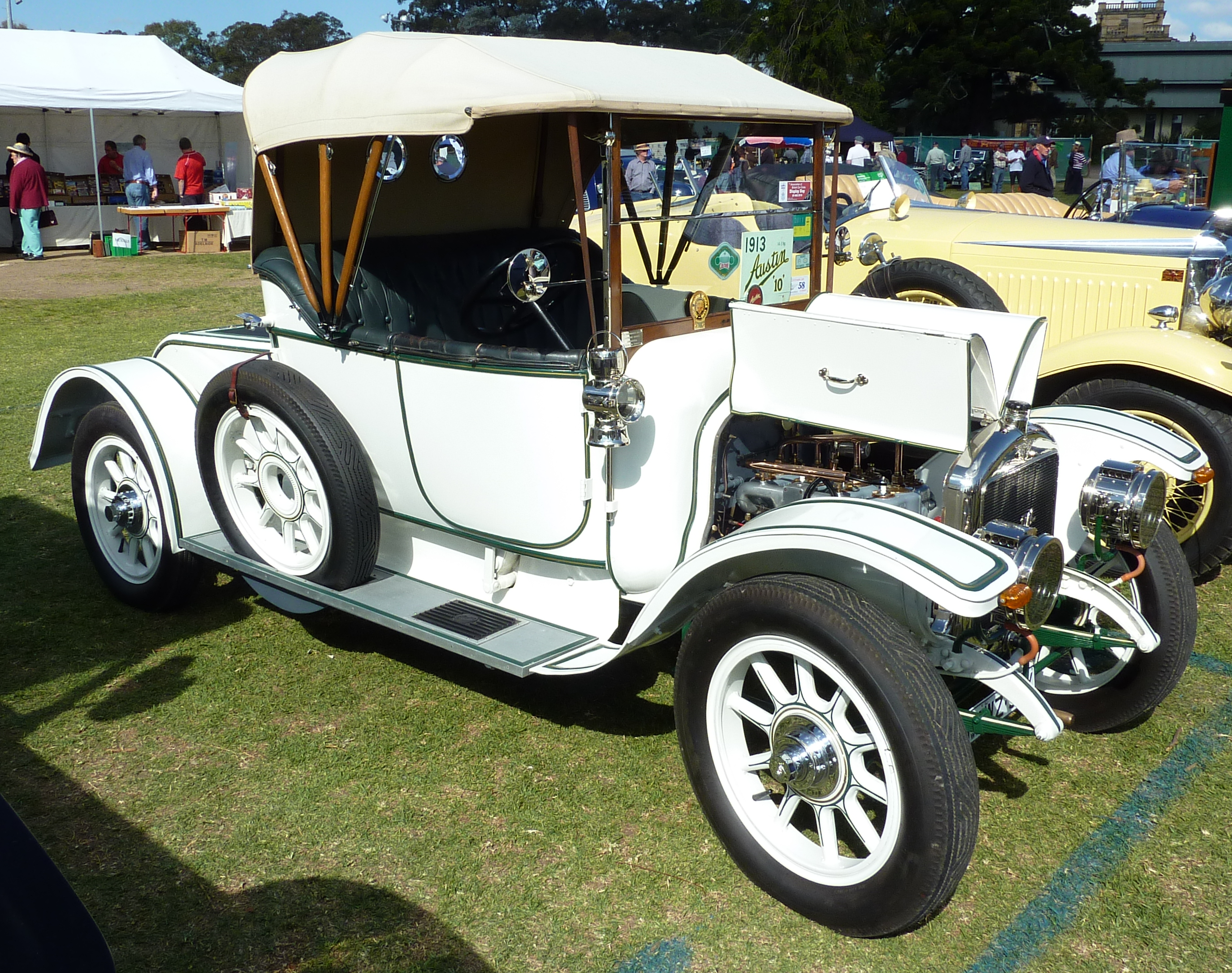
- Open 2-seater 1913; Chassis 10835, body by Tasmanian Motor Co, Launceston, Tasmania

Overview
- Manufacturer: Austin Motor Company Limited; Longbridge Works, Northfield, Birmingham
- Production: 1910–15
- Assembly: Longbridge Works, Birmingham

Body and chassis
- Body style: Courier open 2-seater; open tourer; Sirdar phaeton; chassis for bespoke body

Powertrain
- Engine: 1125 cc vertical inline four cylinder; 1615 cc vertical inline four cylinder
- Transmission: 3-speed gearbox; Austin segmental cone clutch, 4-speed gearbox, propeller shaft with universal joints to live rear axle through bevel gears.

Dimensions
- Wheelbase: 96 in (2,438 mm); 99 in (2,515 mm) or 111 in (2,819 mm); track 48 in (1,219 mm)
- Length: 130 in (3,302 mm); 147 in (3,734 mm)
- Width: 55.5 in (1,410 mm); not reported
- Kerb weight: 10 1/2 long cwt (1,176 lb; 533 kg); not reported

Chronology
- Predecessor: Austin 7 hp

Austin 10–12 T-head
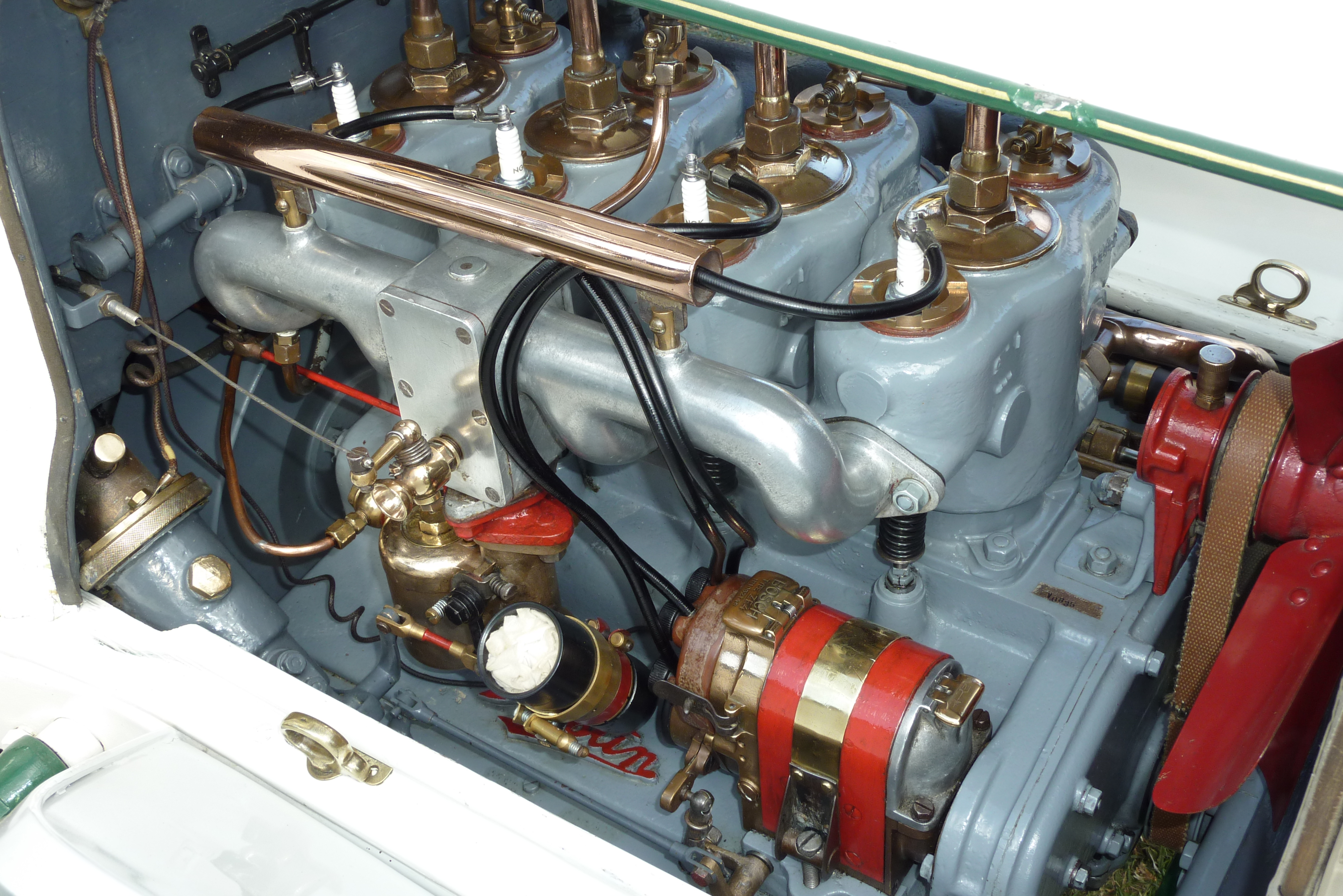
- Engine 10835, 1913

Overview
- Manufacturer: Austin Motor Company Limited

Layout
- Configuration: vertical inline four cylinder
- Displacement: 1,125 cc (69 cu in); 1,615 cc (99 cu in)
- Cylinder bore: 2½" 63.5 mm; 3" 76 mm
- Piston stroke: 3½" 88.9 mm
- Valvetrain: sidevalves

Combustion
- Fuel system: Claudel carburettor
- Fuel type: petrol
- Oil system: pressure
- Cooling system: water

Output
- Power output: not reported; 16 bhp at 1,500 rpm; Tax horsepower 10; Tax horsepower 14.32

Chronology
- Predecessor: Austin 7 hp 1087 cc single cylinder
- Successor: none

The Austin 10 hp is a high-quality small car (not cycle car) produced between 1910 and 1915 by the British car manufacturer Austin Motor Company Limited at their Longbridge, Worcestershire plant near Birmingham. 1,336 cars were made, 213 with the 1125 cc engine and 1,123 with the 1615 cc engine. Like the 1087 cc Austin 7 hp produced by both Austin and Du Cros's Swift Motor Company it was not very successful when sold with the small engine.

The original small 4-cylinder 1125 cc engine was replaced in 1913 with a larger 14.32 horsepower 1615 cc engine. Though rated for tax at 14.3 horsepower this larger engined model is sometimes referred to as the Austin 10/12.

In 1913, the 10 hp was the cheapest model in the Austin range, costing £260 for a chassis with tyres. The 10 hp (of 14.32-h.p.) was renamed 12–14 hp before midsummer 1915 but production was limited due to the war.

== Ten horsepower ==
The high-speed type vertical straight four-cylinder engine has a bore and stroke of 63.5 mm × 88.9 mm (2 1/2 in × 3 1/2 in) giving a capacity of 1125 cc and an RAC and fiscal rating of 10.0 horsepower.

== Fourteen horsepower ==
The new car with the 42 per cent larger engine was described in the Daily Mail newspaper in October 1912. Throttle and ignition levers are mounted on the top of the steering wheel, a foot accelerator is also being fitted. The petrol tank is mounted on the dash.

The high-speed type "T"-head vertical straight four-cylinder engine has a bore and stroke of 76 mm × 88.9 mm (3 in × 3 1/2 in) giving a capacity of 1615 cc and an RAC and fiscal rating of 14.32 horsepower. The cylinders are cast separately in spite of the general trend to monobloc engines. As before the engine is arranged to have interchangeable exhaust and inlet valves on opposing sides of the engine. Engine output was quoted as 12.5 brake horsepower at 1,000 r.p.m. and fully 16 brake horsepower on acceleration to 1,500 r.p.m.

There is a cooling fan for the honeycomb radiator and the engine incorporates a pump to ensure the flow of coolant. Lubrication is forced by pump to all the bearings. A float indicator shows the depth of oil in the crank chamber. Ignition is by High Tension Bosch magneto and may be manually advanced or retarded. The carburettor is by Claudel.

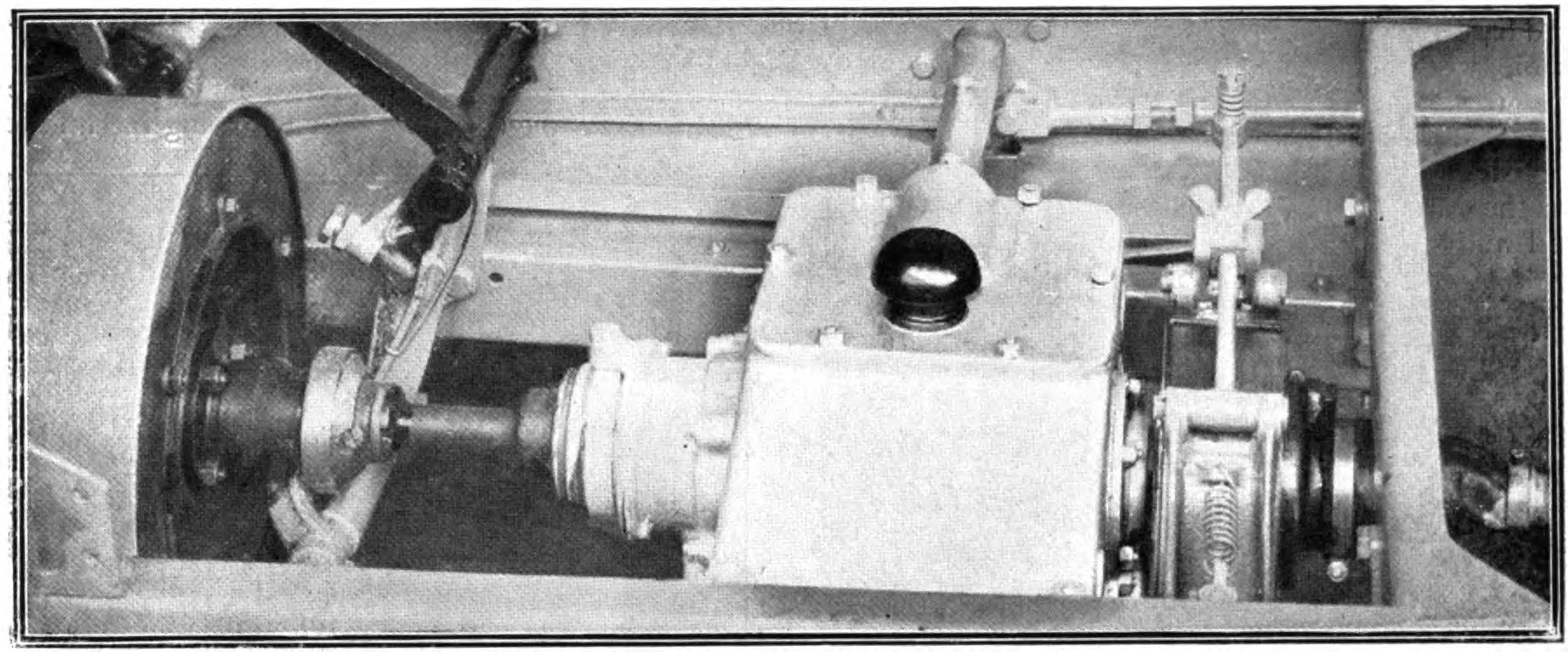
L to R: clutch, bottom of pedals, gearbox, pedal brake on drive-shaft

The thin steel-cone clutch engages with the Ferodo lined flywheel. The Ferodo linings are in sections which may be replaced individually. The gearbox is suspended at four points. It is operated by a hand lever controlled by a gate and now has four speeds forward and reverse.

Drive is taken by propeller shaft with universal joints to a live axle, the actual drive being by bevel gearing. The detachable steel wheels are by Austin-Sankey.

=== Brakes suspension steering ===
The usual foot (transmission) and hand (back wheels) brake levers are provided. The pressed steel frame is suspended by three-quarter elliptic springs at the rear and semi-elliptic in front. The steering gear incorporates a provision to take up wear.

=== Road test ===
John Phillimore of the Daily Mail took out a car with a four-seater body complete with hood and screen – there was no attempt to reduce weight. The engine's running he said was very pleasing giving the impression of an engine of much larger dimensions. No vibration was felt up to about 37 or 38 miles per hour when a slight but by no means annoying vibration appeared. The engine was very flexible in traffic though the sensitive throttle lever must be worked smoothly. The car tested had the old-type clutch and three-speed gearbox. Brakes are powerful and smooth but the hand lever for the wheel brakes is outside. Steering was stiff at low speed. The back axle was quiet, the only noise when running was a slight hum when using the indirect speeds.

The car's switch and oil gauge are mounted below the petrol tank on the dash, where Phillimore considered they stood a good chance of getting severe kicks from passengers' feet. Prices were £240 or £250 for the chassis depending on wheelbase which may be 8 ft 3 in or 9 ft. The shorter body was priced at £55, the longer £65. Hood and screen were extra.

== Bodies ==
=== Open 2-seater with dickey ===
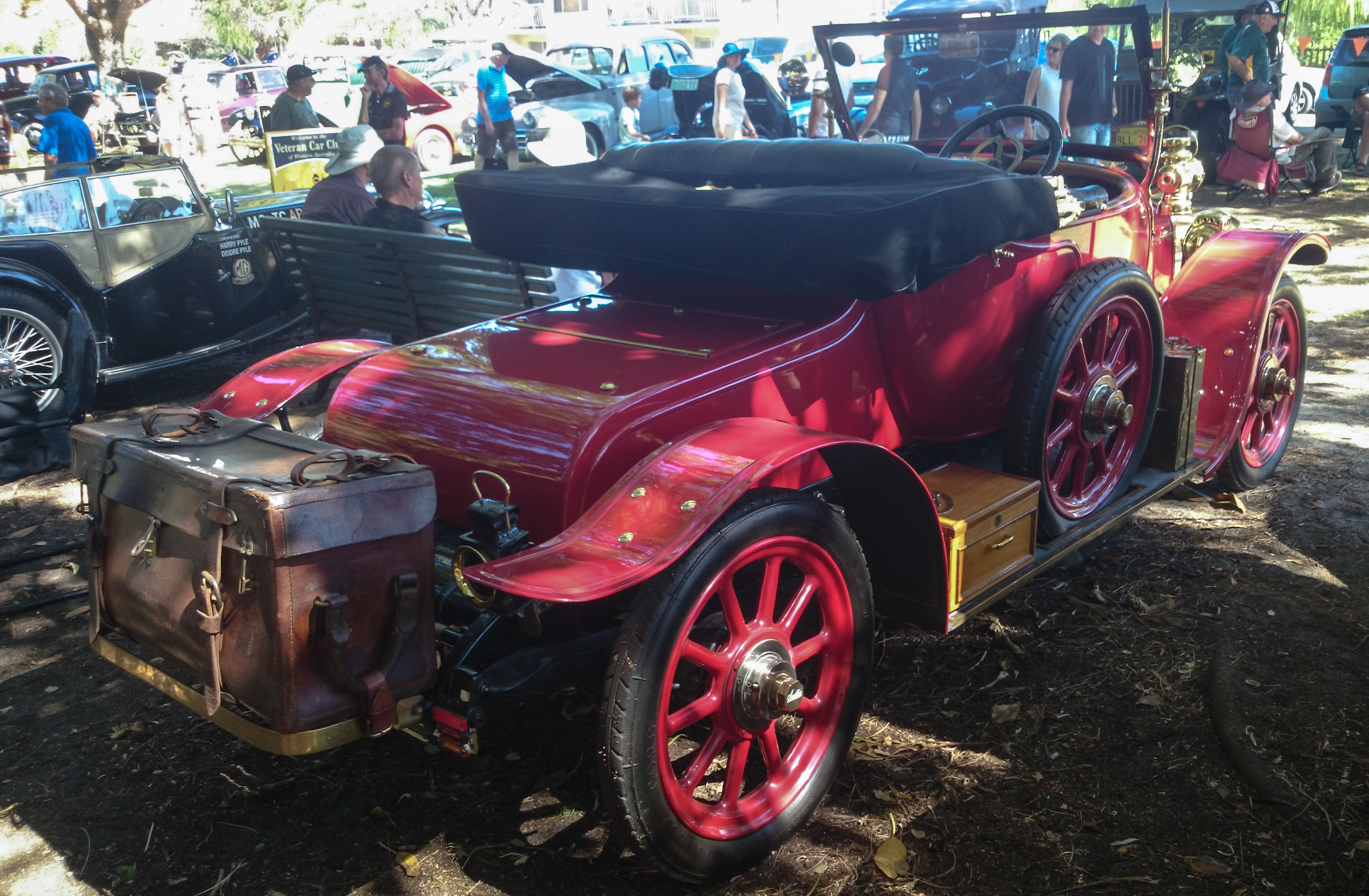
2-seater 1913, body by Dalgety car 10942, engine 11051

=== Tourer ===
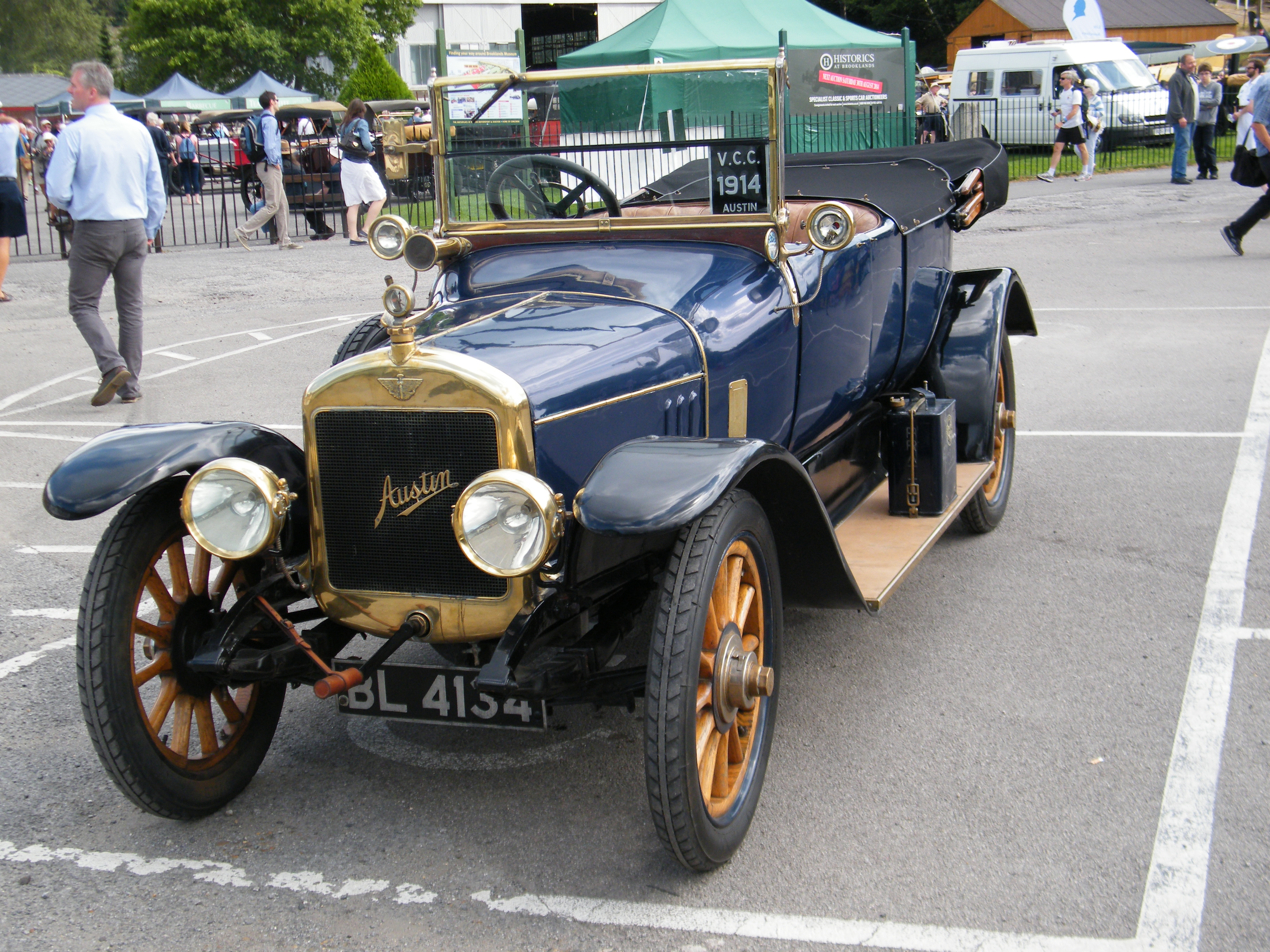
Tourer 1914, body by Peters Car 11165, engine 11294

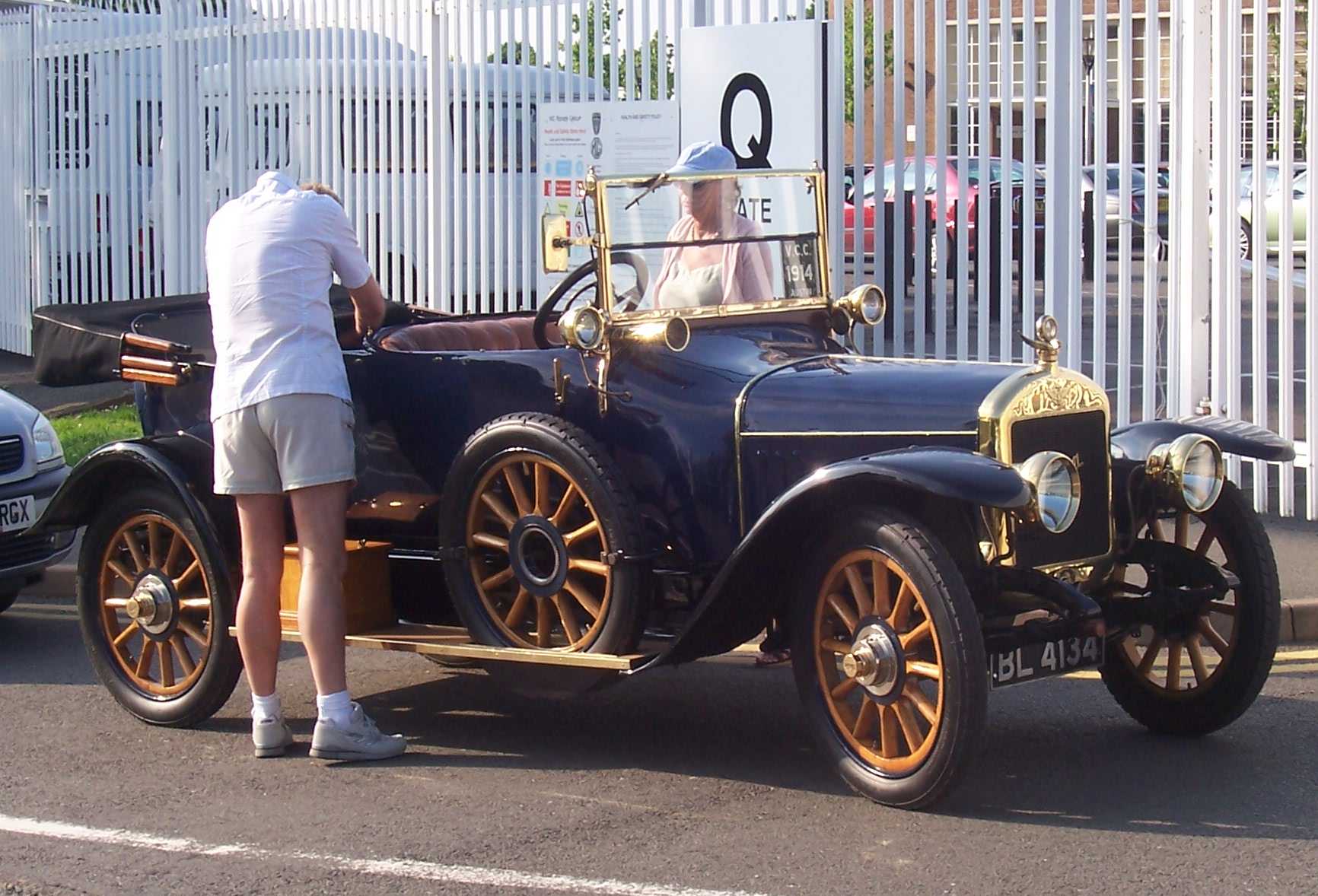
The only brakes on the (rear) wheels are controlled by the lever visible behind the spare wheel

=== Sirdar phaeton ===
Austin's 10-h.p. four-seater phaeton was called Sirdar. It was supplied fitted with leather upholstery and horsehair cushions. A Cape hood was fitted and side curtains. There was a double folding glass screen with brass fittings, a spare wheel and tyre, Lucas paraffin side and tail lamps and Solar mirror lens acetylene headlamps with separate generator. A speedometer and mileage recorder, horn, tyre pump, lifting jack, kit of tools and accessories were all supplied.

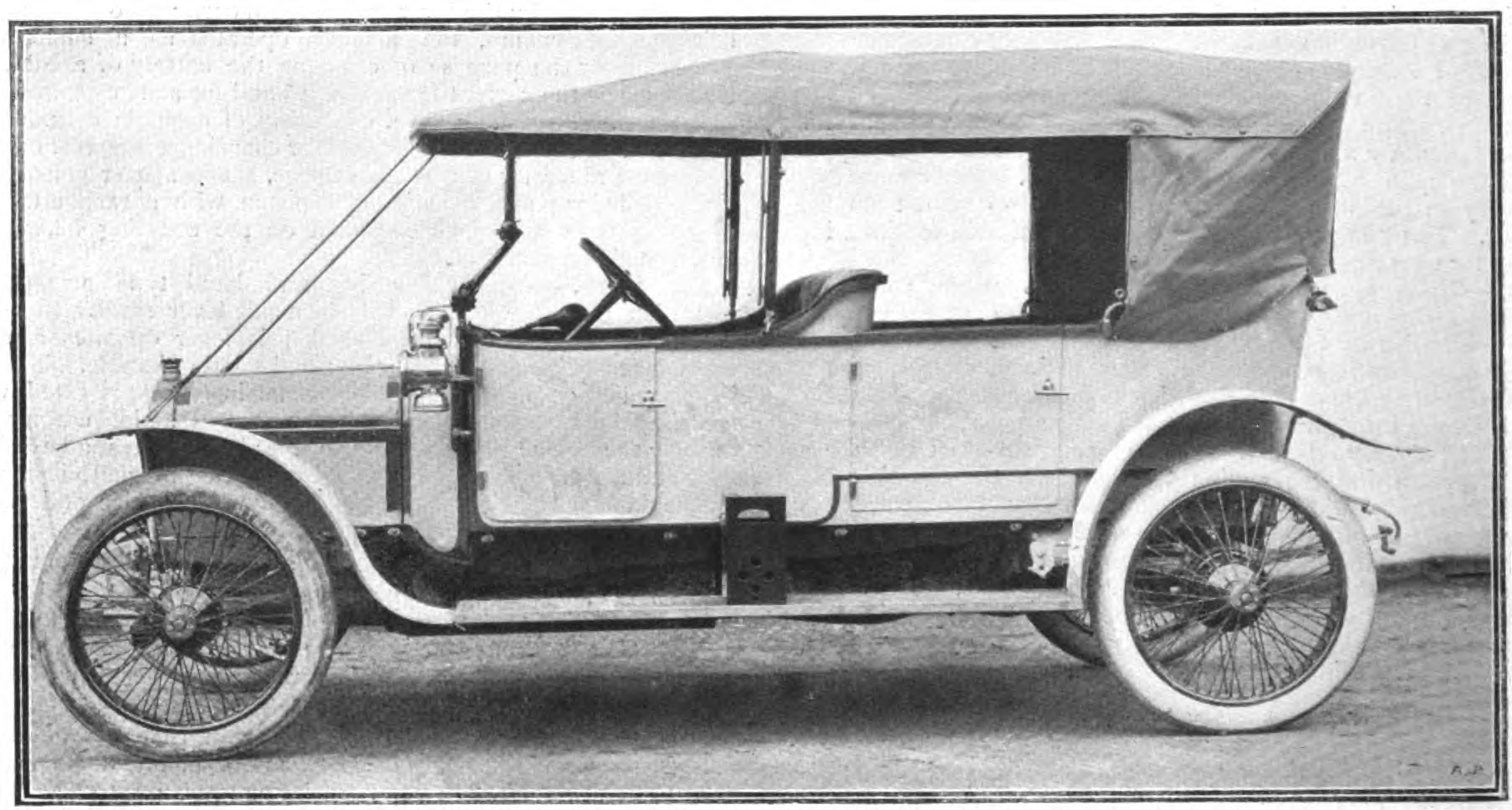
1912 Sirdar phaeton canvas taut

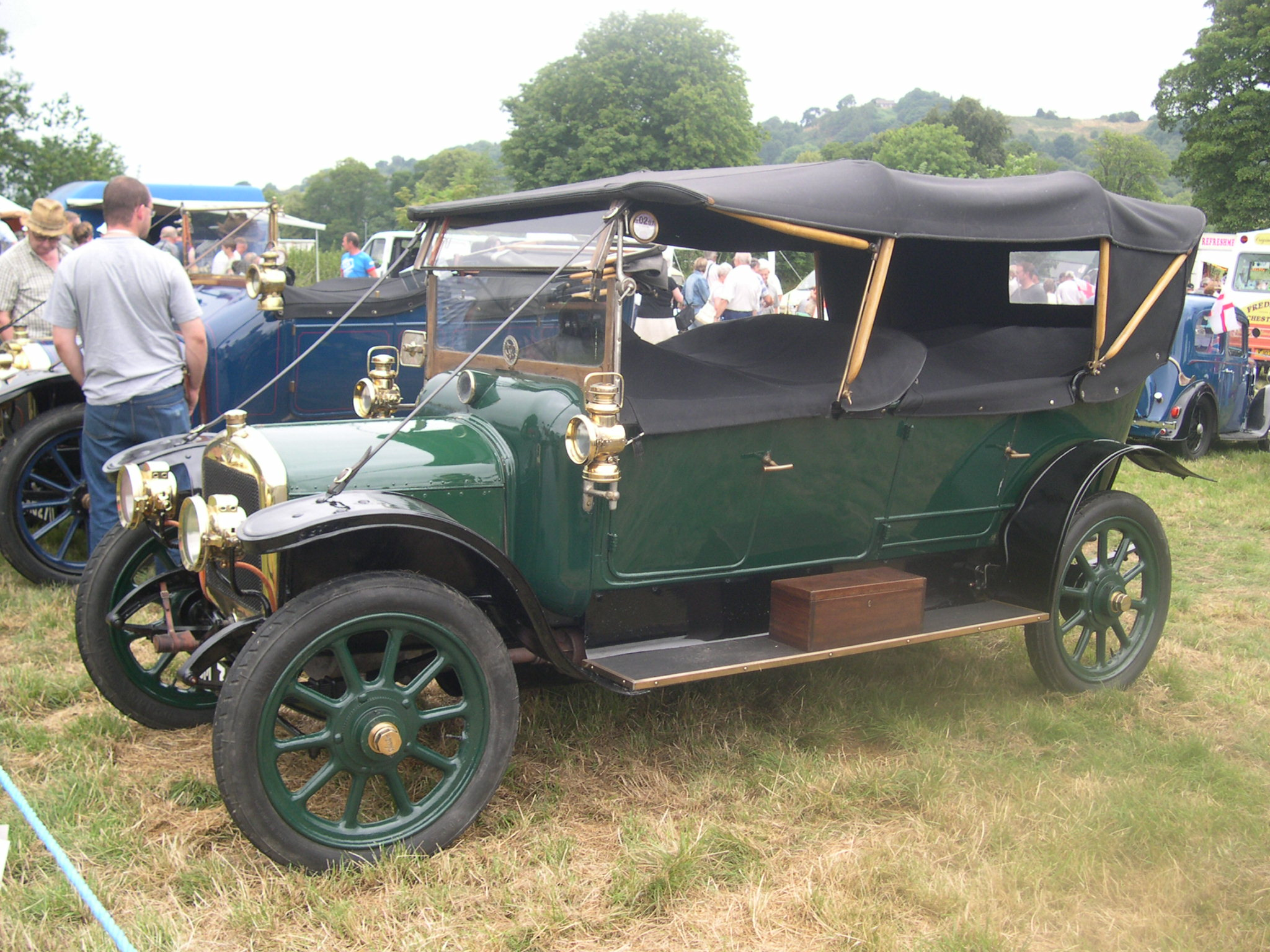
1913 Sirdar phaeton canvas slack

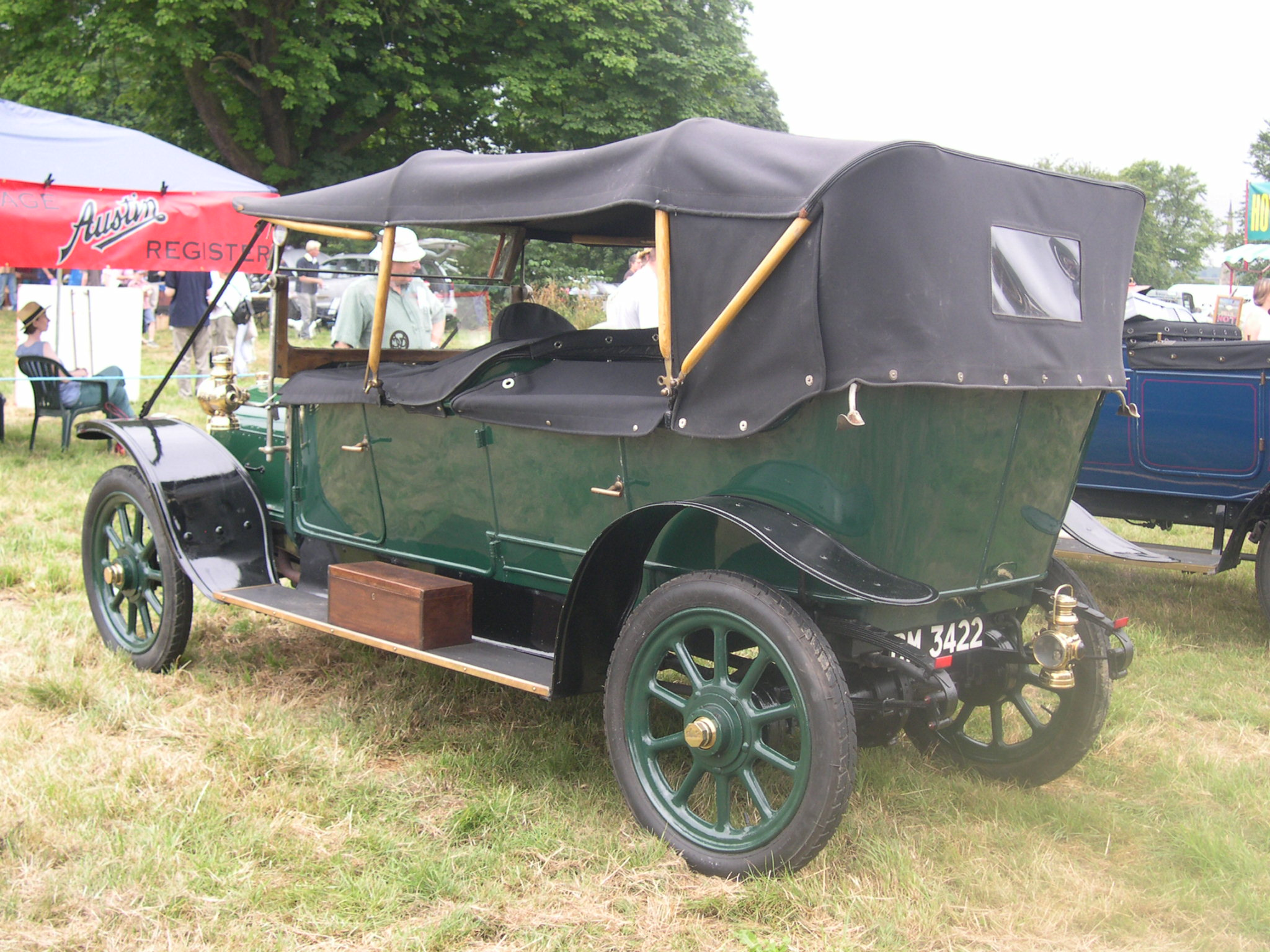
Car 10605, engine 10694

== Production ==
- All numbers extracted from data in the publication by Ian Dimmer, The Edwardian Austin, the survivors, The Vintage Austin Register Limited, 2014

calendar year	total production	1125 cc	1615 cc	3-speed gearbox	4-speed gearbox
1910	10	9	1	10
1911	153	153		153
1912	294	51	243	146	148
1913	495		495		495
1914	269		269		269
1915	115		115	1	114
	1336	213	1123	310	1026
