= Austin 15 hp =

Austin 15-h.p.
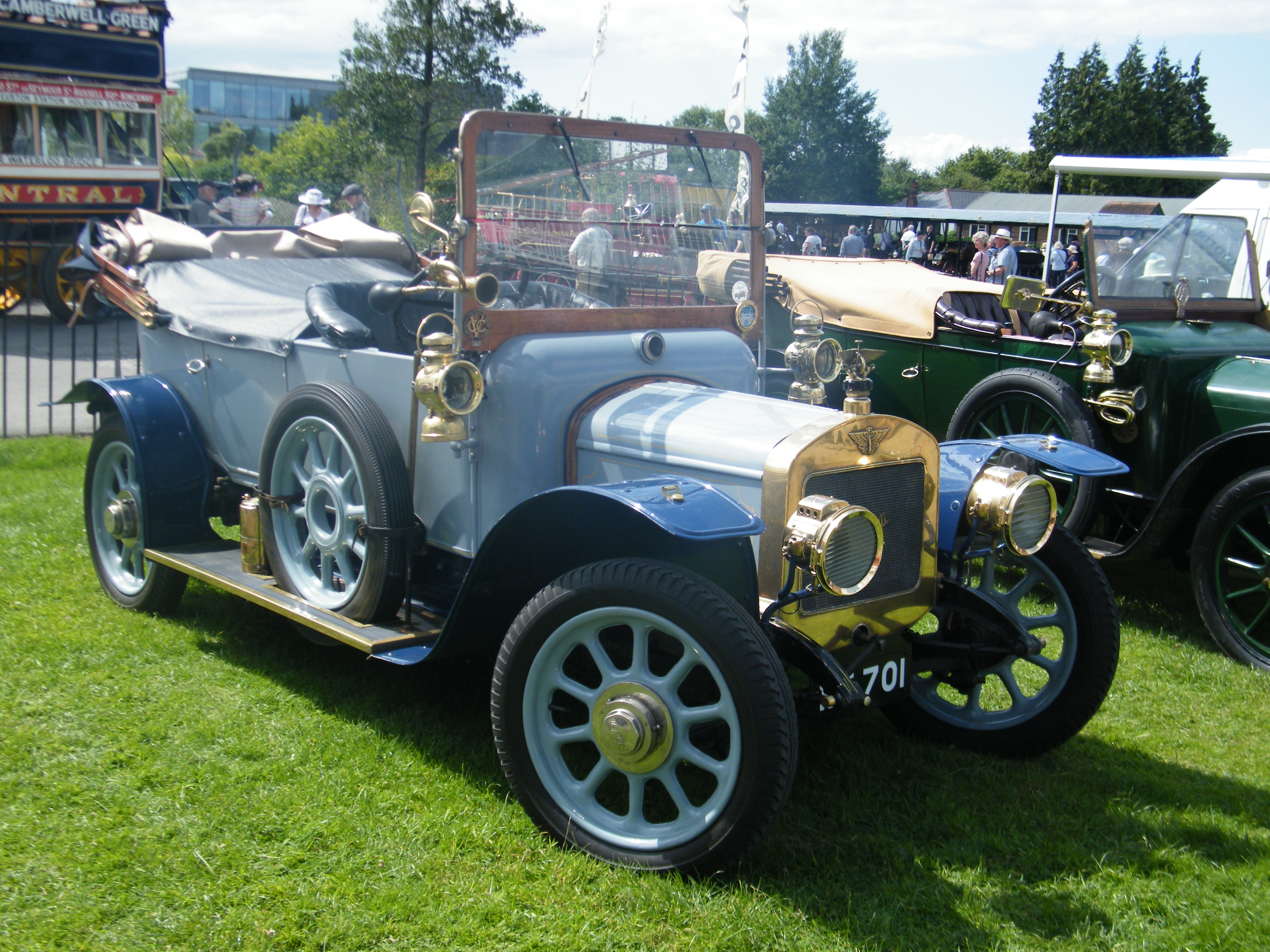
- 1911 chassis with special tourer body chassis 4043, engine 6186

Overview
- Manufacturer: Austin
- Production: 1908 – 1915

Powertrain
- Engine: 2.5-litre (1908-10); 2.8-litre (1911-15)
- Transmission: 4-speed

The Austin 15 hp is a 2.8-litre motor car manufactured by the British manufacturer Austin and first displayed at the seventh exhibition of motor vehicles which opened at London's Olympia in November 1908. Its tax rating was 20 horsepower. It was sold between 1908 and 1915.

== Olympia Motor Show 1908 ==
It was at this show it first became clear British manufacturers now recognised the need to provide medium-sized cars. A host of new models in the 14 to 16 hp class were displayed. Just twelve months later it was believed only Rolls-Royce made solely high-powered cars.

== Monobloc engine ==
The first version, of which 213 were produced, was sold between 1908 and 1910. It was powered by a 4-cylinder 2½-litre (2539 cc) monobloc engine with a 3.5-inch (89 mm) bore x 4-inch (100 mm) stroke and a three-bearing crank-shaft. RAC rating would have been 19.64 h.p. It was Austin's only pre-World War I model to have a, by then usual, monobloc casting.

The cone-type clutch is leather-faced. The male portion consists of six leather sections riveted to spring plates. Should it be necessary an individual section can be removed cleaned and replaced in a few moments without difficulty.

== T-head engine ==
A revised 15 hp model was introduced in 1911 dropping the monobloc engine and reverting to Austin's usual individually cast cylinders side-valve T-head engine design but an increased stroke of 4.5 inches (110 mm) gave a capacity of 2838 cc With the same bore it remained rated at 19.6 hp. Austin manufactured 688 of these more powerful cars. It had a four-speed gearbox with cone clutch, shaft and bevel-drive back axle. Suspension was provided by semi-elliptic leaf springs at the front and Austin-patent full-elliptic leaf springs at the rear. Brakes were by rear wheel drum and transmission brakes. The wheels were wooden artillery style wheels with Michelin detachable rims, 815 x 105 beaded-edge tyres. In 1913, a powered chassis with tyres was available for £350.

== Bodies ==
As with other Austins of the period it was available in a wide range of Austin-made bodies, including a two-seater "Harrogate" (with single rear dicky seat), a two-seater "Ascot", a four-seater "Westminster Landaulet" or "Levee Single Landaulet" and a snub-nose "Town Carriage" with an open driver and closed passenger layout.

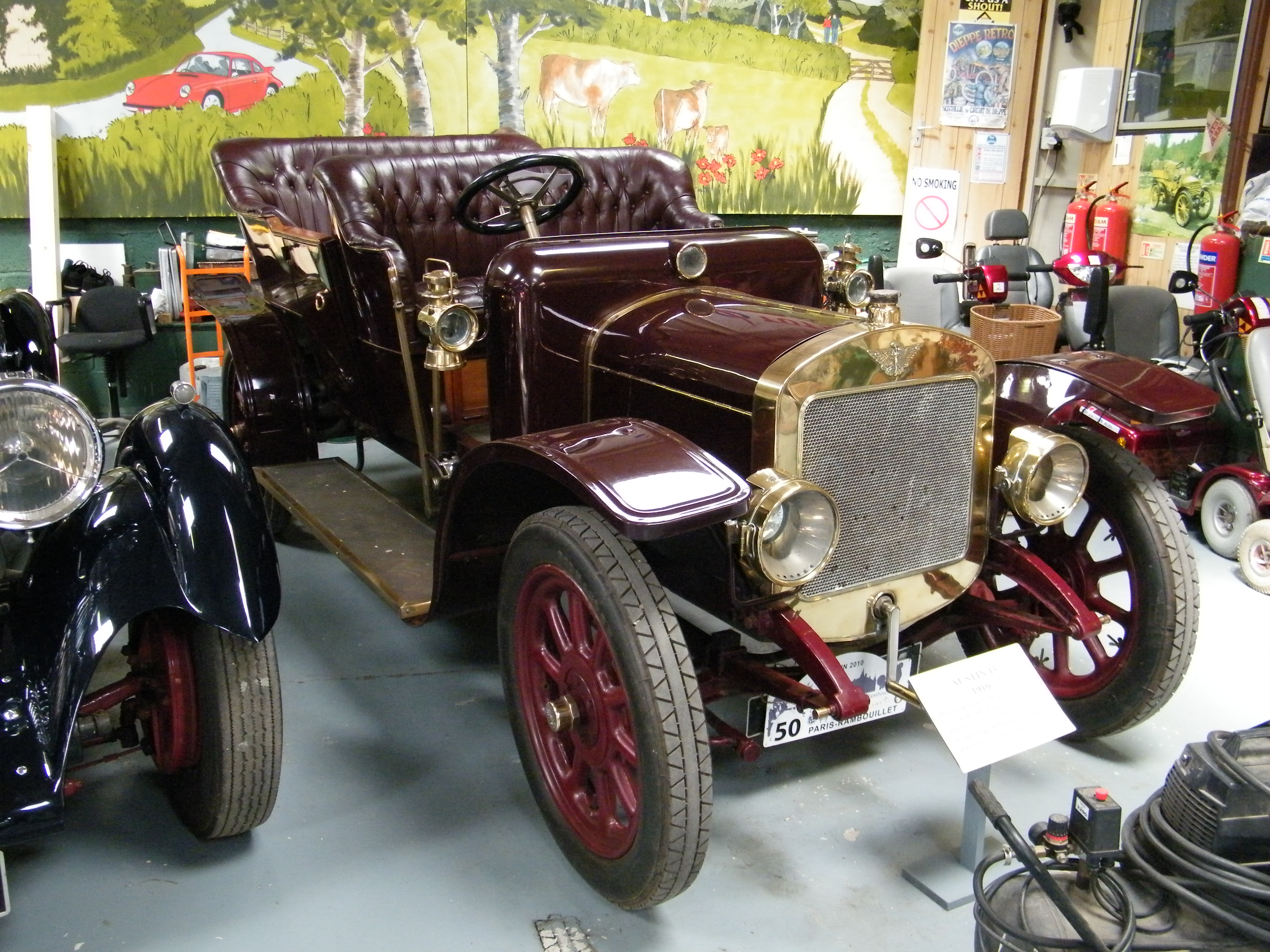
Open tourer 1910
car ----, engine 5460

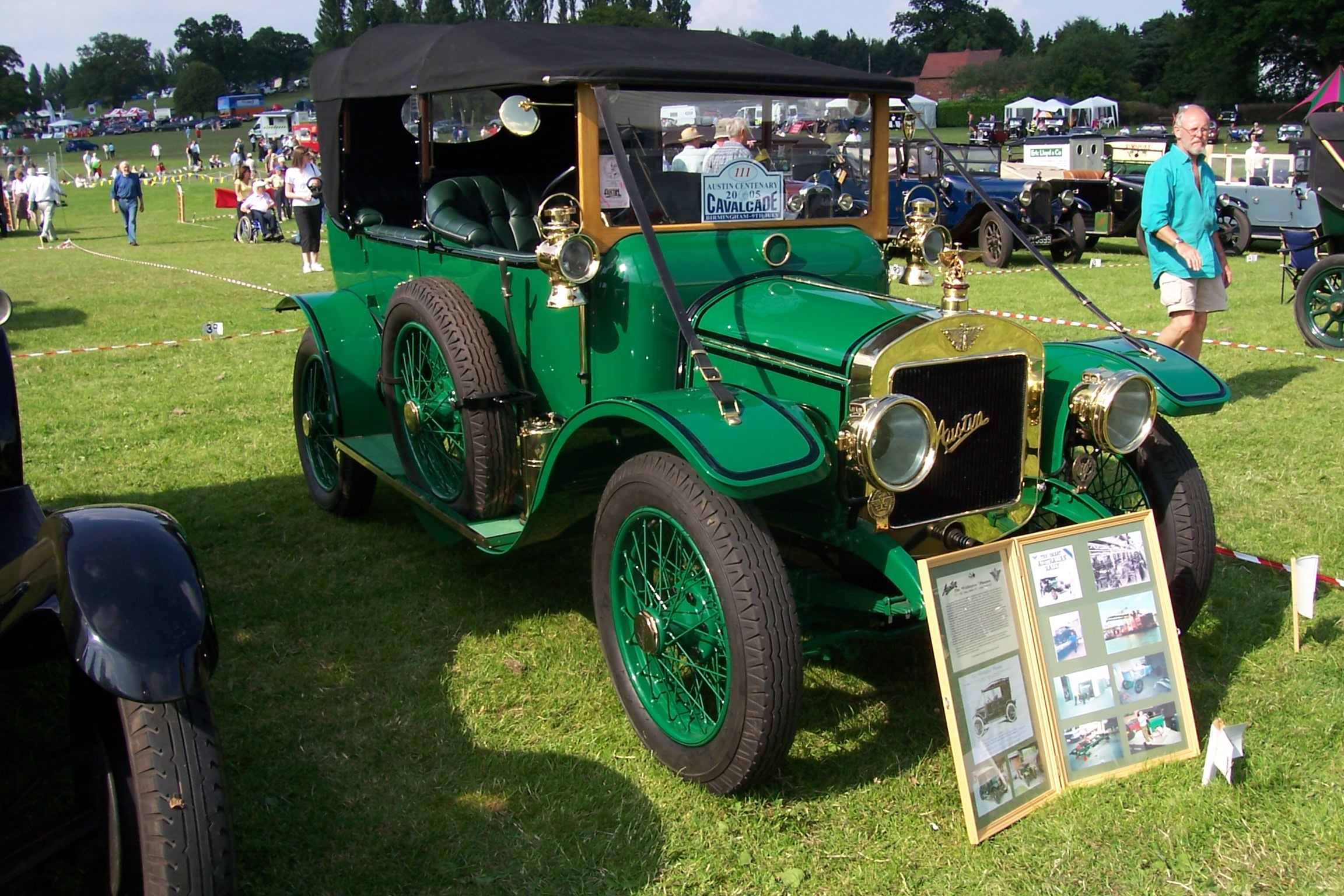
Wellington tourer 1912
car 5997, engine 6107

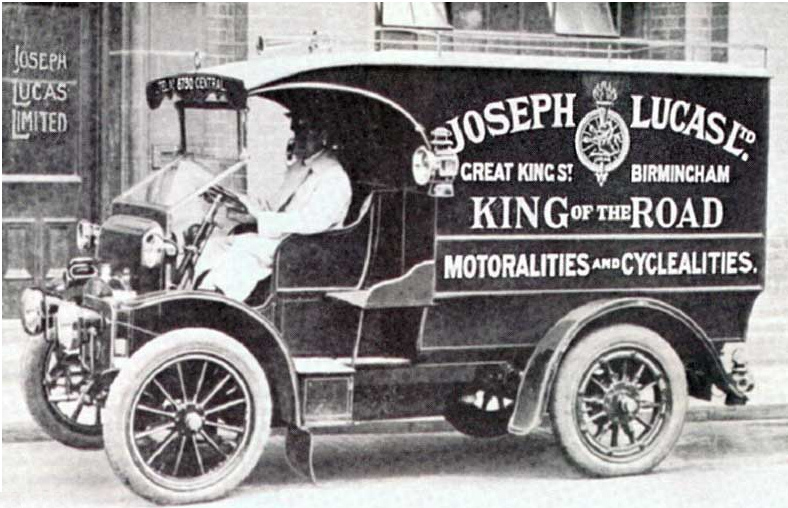
Van 1910

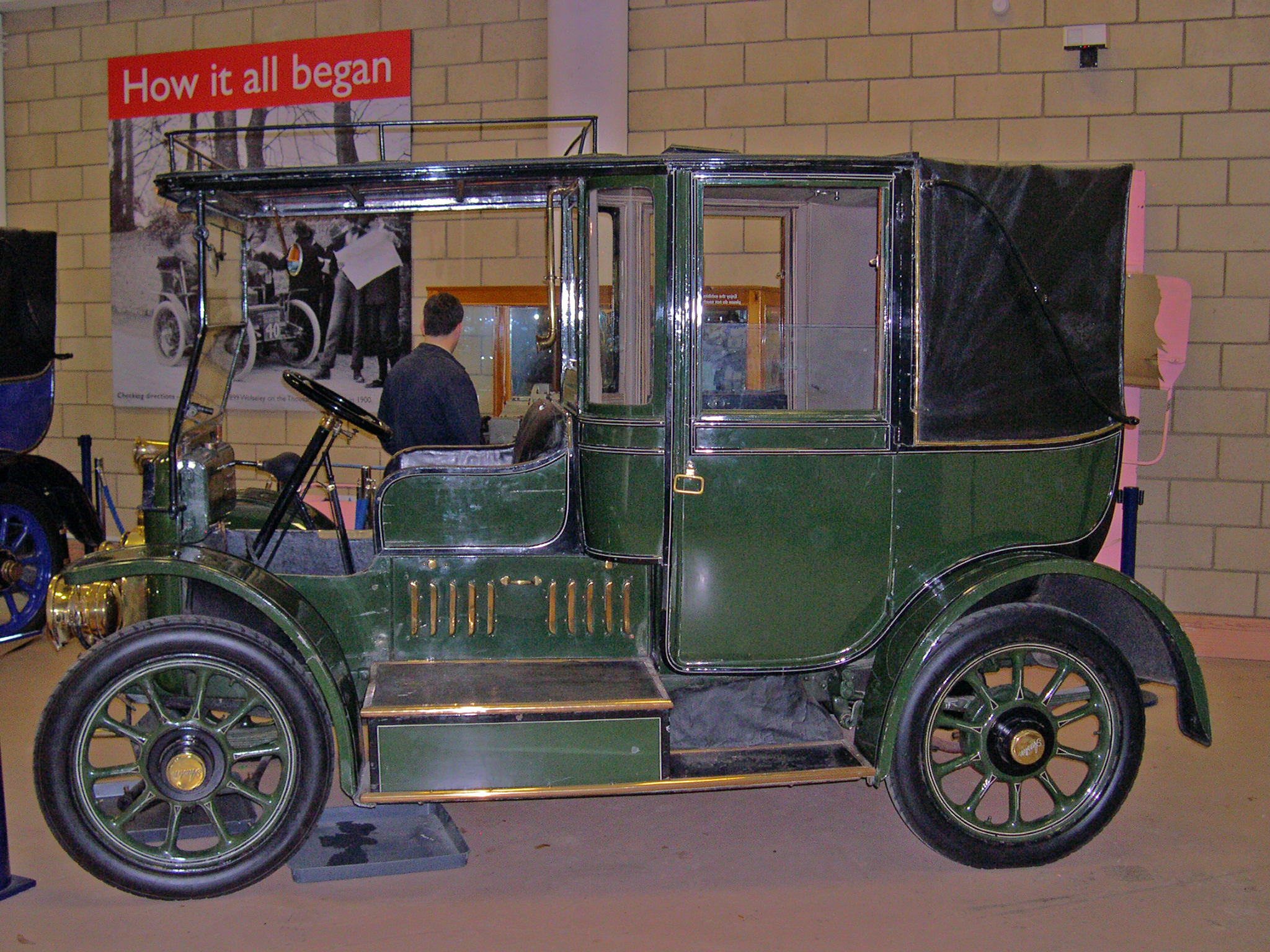
Cab or town carriage 1911
car 5065, engine 6386

== Cab or town carriage 1908 ==
J D Siddeley reviews the design of Herbert Austin's vehicle displayed at Olympia's Commercial Motor Vehicle Exhibition, April 1908.
The Austin four-cylinder chassis is as sound as it is unconventional, the motor is under the driver's seat. Its four cylinders are in one block which forms part of the same casting as the top of the crankcase. Motor and gearbox are built on an underframe secured to the chassis' main frame by rubber insulated bolts at three different points. The underframe may be dropped complete as one unit for adjustments or repairs. The Austin mainframe is not incurved forward as is now usual but finishes about three feet from the front and from the mainframe's cross-members a narrower frame extends forward providing the necessary space for the great steering lock demanded by the Scotland Yard regulations. The regulations demand the ability to turn completely in a road just 25 feet wide.
