= Austin 7 hp =

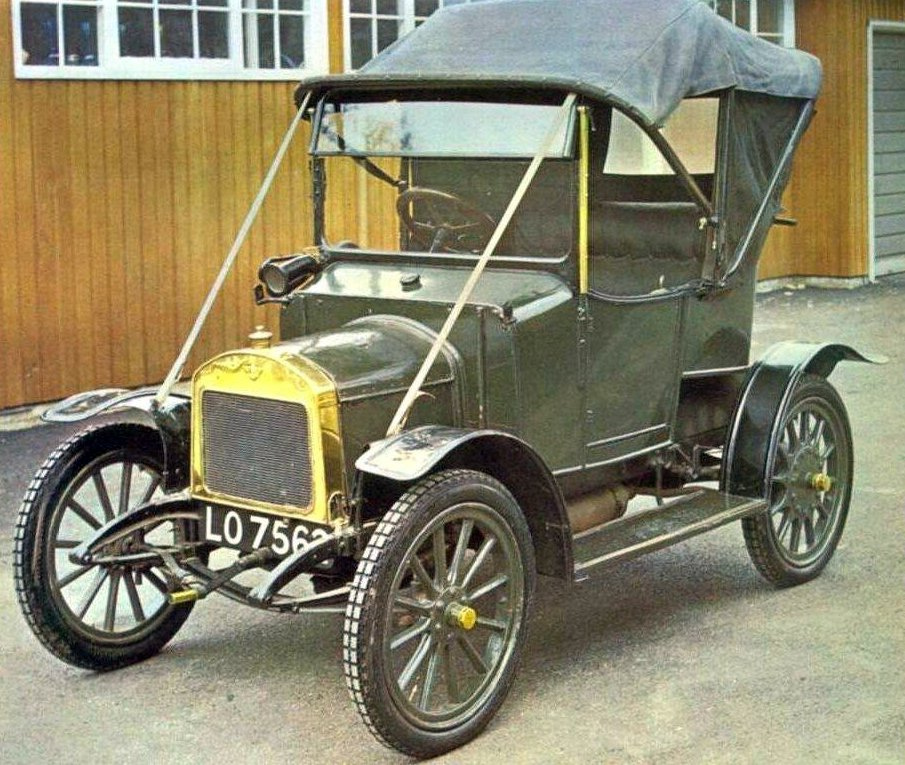
- 1910 open 2-seater

Overview
- Manufacturer: Swift
- Production: 1909–1911
- Assembly: United Kingdom: Coventry, West Midlands

Powertrain
- Engine: 1,087 cc (66.3 cu in) side-valve single-cylinder engine

Dimensions
- Wheelbase: 1,828.8 mm (72 in)
- Length: 2,679.7 mm (8 ft 9 1/2 in)
- Width: 1,397.0 mm (4 ft 7 in)
- Kerb weight: 7 1/2 long cwt (840 lb; 381 kg)

Chronology
- Successor: Austin 7

The Austin 7 hp was a small British motor car designed by Austin and built by Swift from 1909 to 1911. It was introduced to the public at the November 1909 Motor Show at London's Olympia. The resulting 7 hp car was sold under both Austin and Swift marques; a total of 1,030 were produced, 162 of which were Austin.

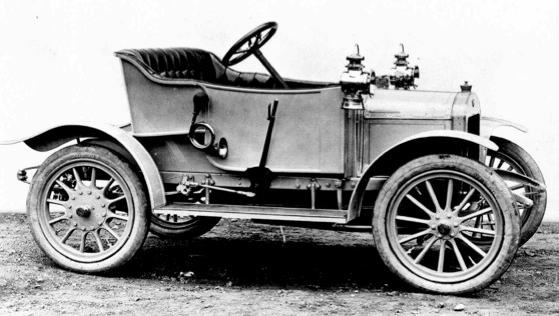
1909 open 2-seater

The 7 hp was powered by a single-cylinder engine, using one cylinder block from the Austin 18/24 engine. The resulting engine of 1099 cc produced 9 hp at 1300 rpm.

The press described it at its first showing as "in every detail thoroughly up-to-date. The frame is of pressed steel, a gate lever operates the gears and the finish is excellent".

The car was sold for £150 but ultimately was not a success, and production ceased after two years.
