= Austin 14 =

Austin Fourteen 1711 cc
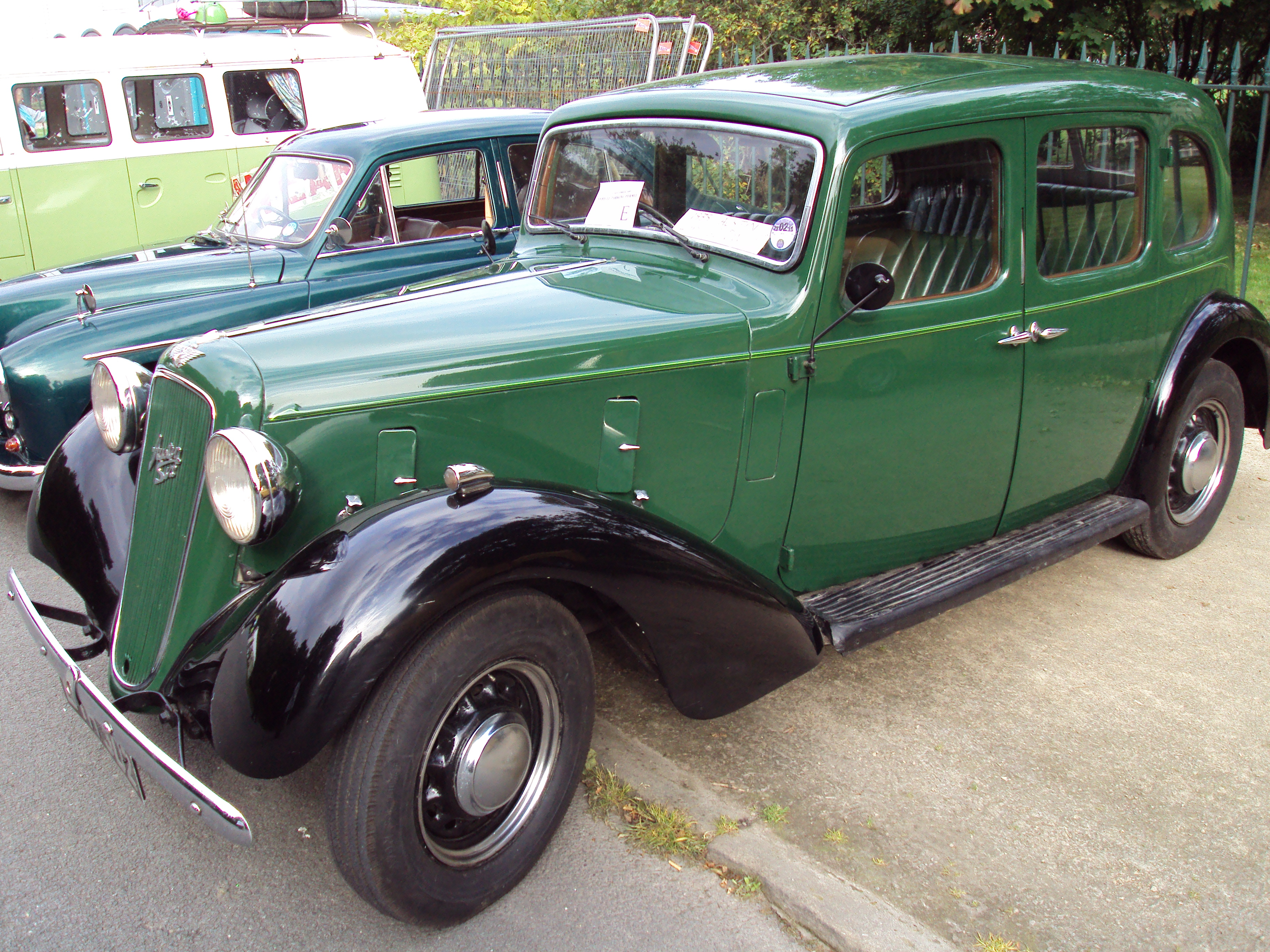
- Fourteen Goodwood six-light saloon

Overview
- Manufacturer: Austin
- Also called: Austin Light Twelve-Six
- Production: 1936–1939

Body and chassis
- Body style: saloon Goodwood cabriolet Goodwood

Powertrain
- Engine: 1711 cc straight-six
- Transmission: spring-loaded dry clutch with a single clutch-plate carries the two friction rings, 4-speed centrally controlled gearbox with synchromesh on 2nd, 3rd and 4th speeds, linked by an open needle-roller-bearing propeller shaft to a spiral bevel driven three-quarter floating rear axle.

Dimensions
- Wheelbase: 111.75 in (2,838 mm); Track F 50 in (1,300 mm); R 53 in (1,300 mm)
- Kerb weight: Saloon 22 1/2 long cwt (2,520 lb; 1,140 kg)

Chronology
- Predecessor: Austin Light Twelve-Six
- Successor: none

Austin Fourteen engine 1711

Overview
- Manufacturer: Austin

Layout
- Configuration: Straight 6-cylinder
- Displacement: 1,711 cc (104 cu in)
- Cylinder bore: 65.5 mm (2.58 in)
- Piston stroke: 84.63 mm (3.332 in)
- Cylinder block material: cast iron, alloy crankcase. The crankshaft runs in four main bearings, a vibration damper is fitted at its front end
- Cylinder head material: detachable, aluminium alloy pistons are aluminium
- Valvetrain: side valves

Combustion
- Fuel system: downdraught carburettor supplied by a petrol pump, ignition by dynamo combined as a unit with the fan above the cylinder head
- Fuel type: petrol
- Cooling system: radiator, fan, thermostatically controlled cooling water is circulated naturally

Output
- Power output: 38.7 bhp (28.9 kW; 39.2 PS) @3,800 rpm Tax horsepower 15.96 from December 1937 revised engine 46 bhp (34 kW; 47 PS) @4,000 rpm

Chronology
- Predecessor: Austin Light Twelve-Six
- Successor: none

The Austin Fourteen is a 1.7-litre saloon that was introduced by Austin in August 1936 and available as a Goodwood saloon—with a fixed or sliding head—or as a Goodwood cabriolet. The body was of steel throughout. Nominally classed by Austin as a Fourteen the actual engine size attracted tax for a 16 horsepower car. The performance of the engine carried over from the Light Twelve-Six proved disappointing and a much smoother revised version with a near 20% improvement in power output was introduced the next year.

== Equipment ==
The car was supplied with an adjustable steering column and body insulation. It comfortably carried four passengers with room for a small fifth passenger in the centre of the back seat. Even the quarter-lights were supplied with blinds, there were flush fitting footrests in the back of the large, adjustable, front seats with pull straps above. The back floor was flat except for the somewhat pronounced propeller shaft tunnel tunnel. The boot was provided with a fitted suitcase, the spare wheel sitting horizontally in the space below. The boot door could be let down and used as a luggage platform.

== Chassis ==
The monopiece steel roof, doors and floors were insulated against heat and noise. The frame had cruciform centre bracing and its cross members were reversed to form box sections with the side members.

Engine clutch and gearbox were insulated as one assembly from the chassis by live rubber, there being two suspension points in front and one at the back of the gearbox. Silencer and exhaust system were insulated from the chassis by rubber mounting.

=== Suspension ===
Half-elliptical zinc interleaved springs were fitted with self-lubricating discs and controlled by hydraulic shock absorbers. In front the springs were shackled forward and were flat, the back springs underhung.

=== Brakes ===
Brakes by Girling were of the wedge and roller mechanically operated type and the four were worked by hand or foot.

=== Steering ===
Steering was by hour-glass worm and sector.

== Road Test ==
The Times' correspondent reported that the engine felt sturdy and willing but that refinement and brilliance were "not its strong points". The extra low pressure tyres allowed lightness and sway at speed he said but the car held the road satisfactorily and 65 miles an hour proved a comfortable maximum speed.

== Revision ==
Eight months after the road test was published The Times felt able to report that the Austin Fourteen was now a much improved car.

=== Engine ===
The engine had been given a new cylinder head, larger downdraught carburettor, larger inlet valves and a higher compression ratio. Power output had moved up from 38.7 bhp at 3,800 rpm to 46 bhp at 4,000 rpm, an increase of near 20%.

== 1939 ==
Now supplied with an improved engine mounting, new pistol grip handbrake, shock absorbers, lubricated road springs and given, like the Twelve, higher and wider doors and a longer bonnet.

Examples of Austin cars
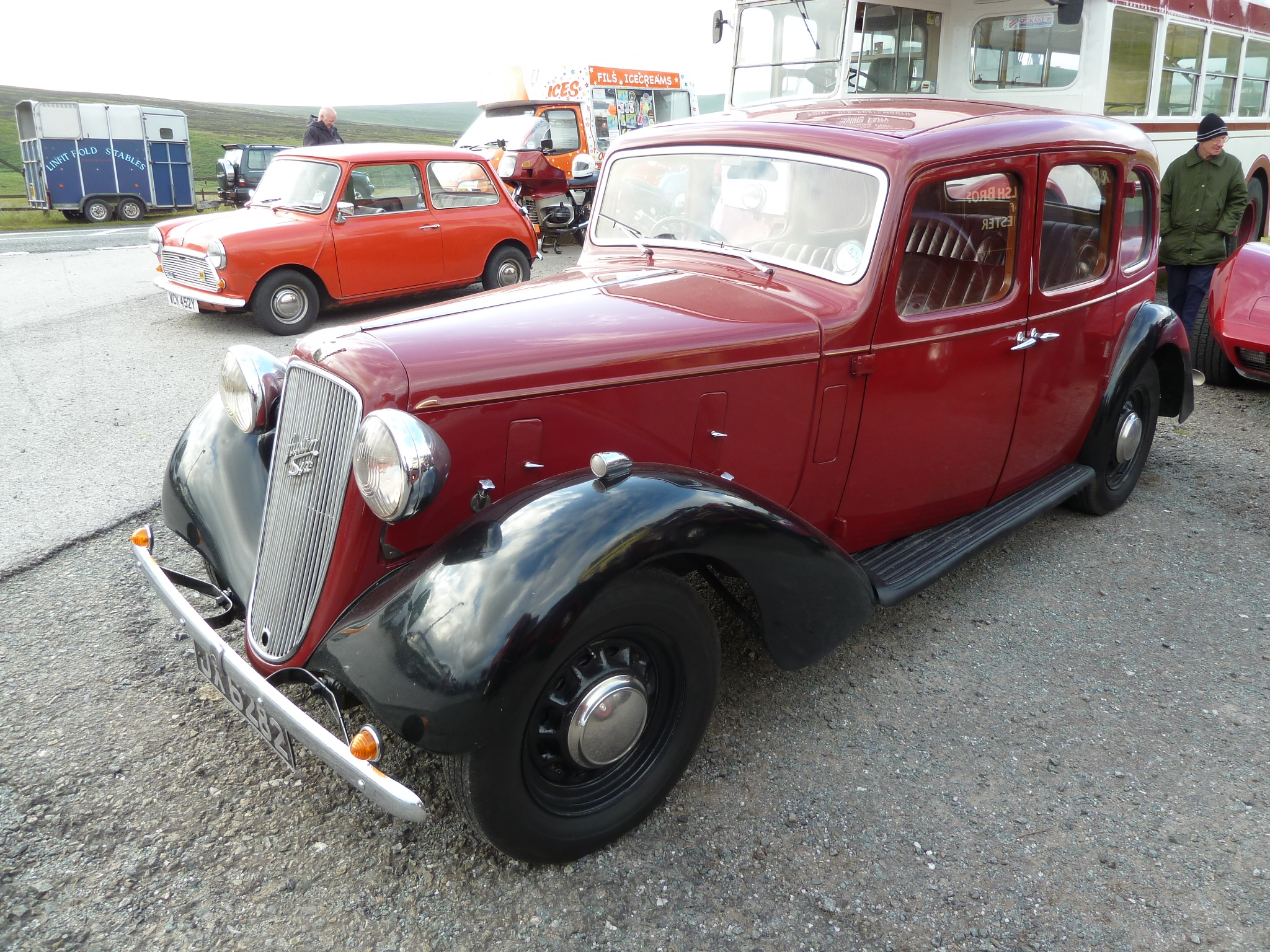
Early 1938 car

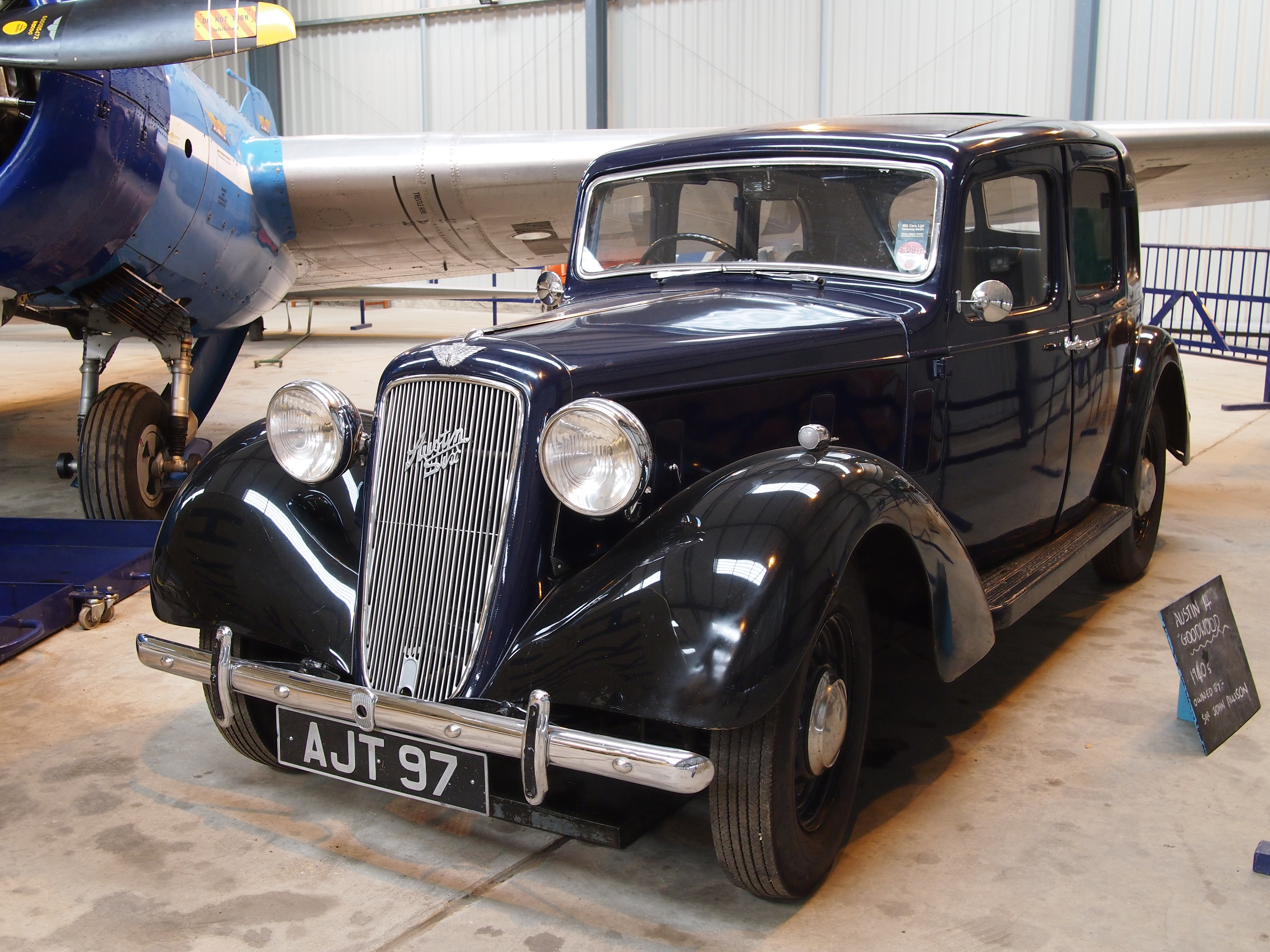
Late car with larger doors and bonnet
Shuttleworth Collection Bedfordshire
