= Austin 12 (1939) =

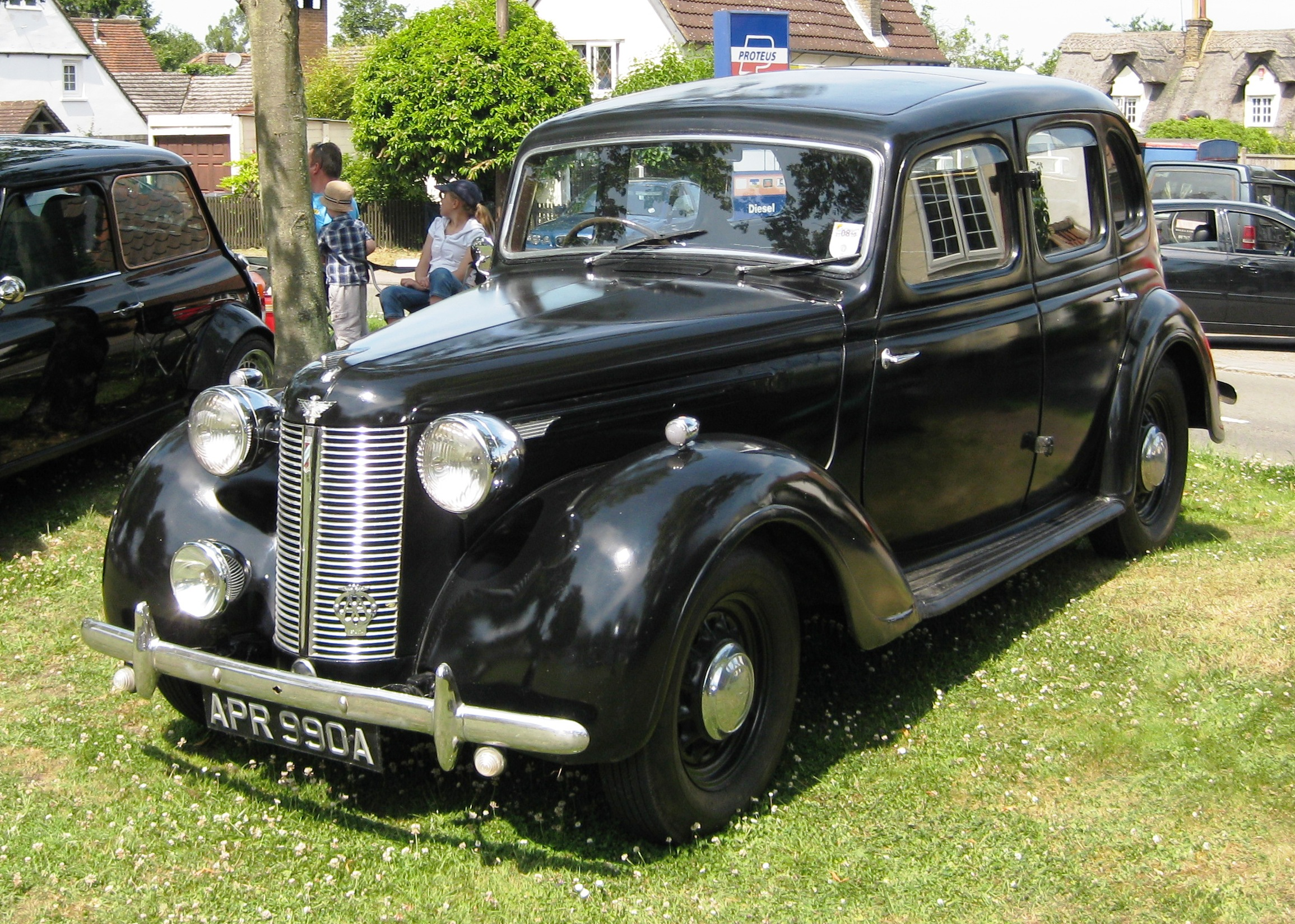

Overview
- Manufacturer: Austin
- Also called: Austin Twelve
- Production: 1939–1947; 8,600 made

Body and chassis
- Body style: 4-door saloon

Powertrain
- Engine: 1535 cc 4-cylinder side-valve 40 bhp

Dimensions
- Wheelbase: 2,654 mm (104.5 in)
- Length: 4,343 mm (171.0 in)
- Width: 1,702 mm (67.0 in)
- Curb weight: 1,225 kg (2,701 lb)(approx)

Chronology
- Predecessor: Austin 12/4
- Successor: Austin A70 Hampshire

The Austin 12 is a large four-door family saloon that was produced by Austin. It was launched in August 1939 and was produced until replaced in 1947 by the similar-sized but larger-engined Austin A70 Hampshire. For much of this period, however, it was provided only for military and government use.

== The car ==
The car was presented as an all-new design. It shared a six-light (three windows on each side) profile with its predecessor, but was more streamlined. Standard fittings included a sliding roof, opening windscreen and leather upholstery. The bonnet (hood) was now one piece and hinged at the rear, rather than opening at the sides. The body was 3 inches (7.6 cm) longer than the earlier car, despite having a wheelbase that was (initially) 5.5 inches (14 cm) shorter. It was also 0.5-inch (1.3 cm) wider. A conventional chassis frame was retained, and the brakes were mechanical, with operation by a system of rods. Rigid beam axles were retained front and rear with conventional leaf springs.

The 1939 Austin 12 inherited a 1535 cc sidevalve engine and four-speed gearbox from its predecessor. 40 bhp (30 kW) of output was claimed. Even by the standards of the day, it was considered by many to be underpowered. This issue was addressed in 1945 when Austin introduced the Austin 16, which was an Austin 12 fitted with the manufacturer's first ohv engine, this having a displacement of 2199 cc. The extra power converted the car into what one commentator described as "a particularly lively proposition", although by this time the less-than-lively Austin 12 had been in production for six years with the same body.

== The times ==
The new Austin 12 was introduced in August 1939, at a time when accelerated military spending was overflowing into a domestic consumer boom on the UK market. However, for Britain and her European allies 1939 was also the year when, in September, war broke out, and the British government switched the country's manufacturing sector onto a war footing much more abruptly than was achieved in Germany. Most of the Midlands-based auto-making capacity, with its recently enhanced understanding of mass-producing metal goods, was switched to war supplies: this involved not merely aircraft manufacture but also (for some historians less glamorous) items such as tanks and Jerrycans. Austin's auto-production capacity seems to have survived through the war better than that of competitors, and while new Austin 12s produced during the early 1940s were restricted to military and government use, the manufacturer was able to announce its postwar range in 1944, six months before the war in Europe ended. The line-up readied for the post-war period included the Austin 12.

== Evolution ==
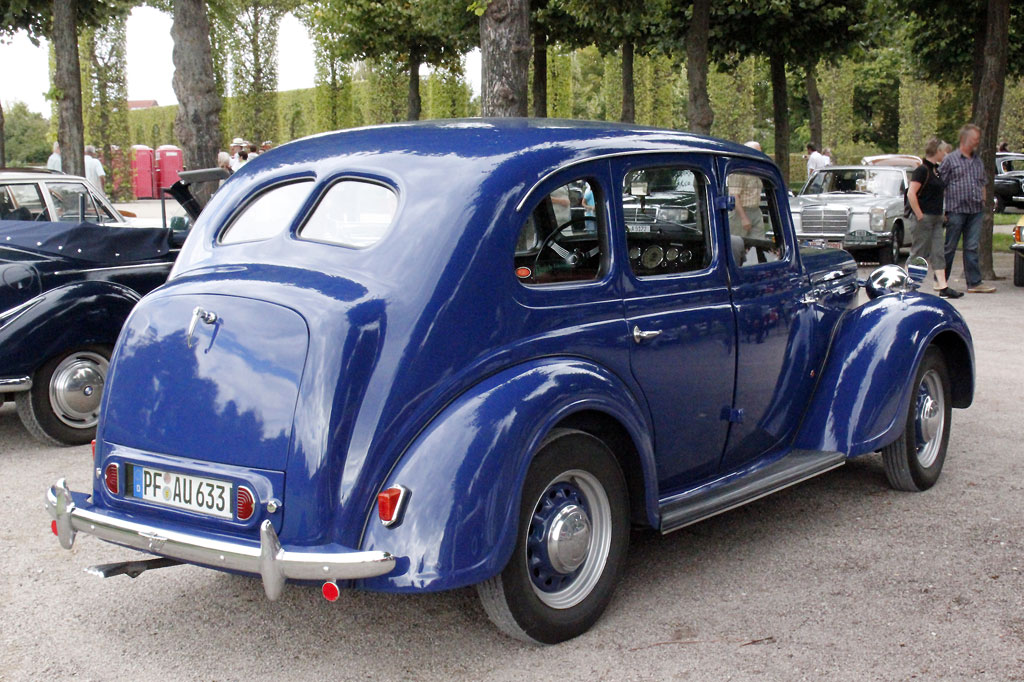
1947 Austin 12

There is little detailed information on how the car was developed during the war years, although by September 1945 numerous refinements and improvements had been implemented, presumably in response both to technical developments and materials shortages encountered. From the exterior the Austin 12 as announced in 1944 appears indistinguishable from the car announced in August 1939, and there was no attempt to highlight improvements introduced during the preceding five years. Nevertheless, the wheelbase had been reduced by 1.5 inches (3.8 cm). A heater and radio were offered as extras.

A significant interior improvement on the postwar model was redesign of the dash/instrument cluster. As evidenced on the pictures in an Austin-produced ad at the time of the 1939 introduction, the instrument cluster design was essentially carry-over from the typical layout on prior 1930's Austin cars (and continued on the postwar 8 and 10), basically two large dials directly in front of the driver. On the postwar 12, and the 16 which followed, the instrument cluster was an elongated type across the centre of the car.
