= Austin 12/6 =

Austin Light Twelve-Six
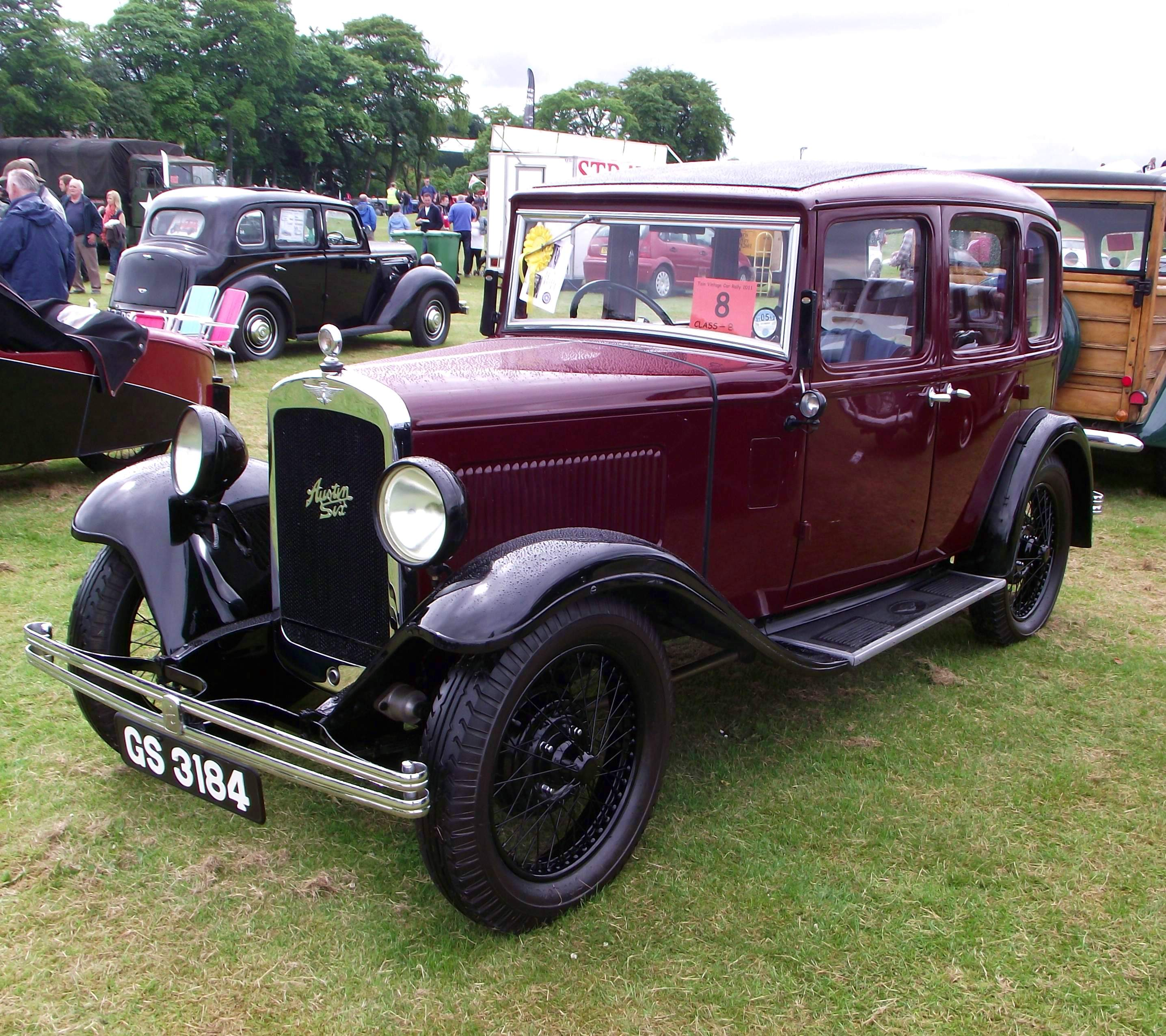
- Light Twelve-Six Harley 6-light metal saloon first registered May 1932

Overview
- Manufacturer: Austin
- Production: 1931–1937; 30,316 produced

Body and chassis
- Body style: two seater Eton; tourer Open Road; saloons: metal – Harley; — Ascot fabric—Clifton: sports saloons: Kempton, Greyhound; sports tourer Newberry (sic)

Powertrain
- Engine: 1496 or 1711 cc Straight-6
- Transmission: single-plate dry clutch, 3-speed centrally controlled gearbox taking the drive through an open propeller shaft to the spiral bevel driven three-quarter floating rear axle.

Dimensions
- Wheelbase: 106 in (2,692 mm); Track 4' 2", 50 in (1,300 mm)
- Length: 146 in (3,708 mm) (1931)
- Width: 62 in (1,575 mm)
- Kerb weight: Saloon 19 1/2 long cwt (2,184 lb; 991 kg)

Chronology
- Predecessor: variant of Austin Twelve
- Successor: Austin Fourteen Goodwood

Austin Light Twelve-Six engine 1496

Overview
- Manufacturer: Austin

Layout
- Configuration: Straight 6-cylinder
- Displacement: 1,496 cc (91 cu in)
- Cylinder bore: 61.25 mm (2.411 in)
- Piston stroke: 84.63 mm (3.332 in)
- Cylinder block material: cast iron, alloy crankcase. Four bearing crankshaft
- Cylinder head material: detachable, pistons are special aluminium alloy
- Valvetrain: side valves

Combustion
- Fuel system: downdraught carburettor supplied by a petrol pump, ignition by battery and coil
- Fuel type: petrol
- Oil system: forced
- Cooling system: radiator, fan, thermostatically controlled cooling water is circulated naturally

Output
- Power output: 24 bhp (18 kW; 24 PS) @2,400 rpm Tax horsepower 13.96

Chronology
- Successor: none

Austin Light Twelve-Six engine 1711

Overview
- Manufacturer: Austin

Layout
- Configuration: Straight 6-cylinder
- Displacement: 1,711 cc (104 cu in)
- Cylinder bore: 65.5 mm (2.58 in)
- Piston stroke: 84.63 mm (3.332 in)
- Cylinder block material: cast iron, alloy crankcase.
- Cylinder head material: detachable, pistons are aluminium
- Valvetrain: side valves

Combustion
- Fuel system: downdraught carburettor supplied by a petrol pump, ignition by dynamo combined as a unit with the fan above the cylinder head
- Fuel type: petrol
- Cooling system: radiator, fan, thermostatically controlled cooling water is circulated naturally

Output
- Power output: 38.7 bhp (28.9 kW; 39.2 PS) @3,800 rpm Tax horsepower 15.96

Chronology
- Successor: Austin Fourteen

The Austin Light Twelve-Six is a 14 tax horsepower car with a 1496 cc engine that was introduced by Austin in January 1931. It was named by Austin Light Twelve to separate it from the well-established Austin Twelve. The general public then dubbed the original Twelve Heavy Twelve but Austin never used that name. The Light Twelve-Six remained in production until 1936.

In August 1936 the Austin Goodwood 14 (of 16 tax horsepower) with its "sound insulated coachwork" took the place of the Twelve-Six saloons. The tourers remained available. The Goodwood was also available as a separate chassis.

== Six cylinders ==
There was among British car makers in the early 1930s a vogue for small capacity six-cylinder engines and the Light Twelve-Six was Austin's version. The side-valve engine was new and initially of 1496 cc capacity. Thermostatic control of the cooling system was added in September 1932. An increased 65.5 mm bore, larger capacity 1711 cc option was available at no extra charge from August 1933. Further details of these engines are in the panels at the right.

A three-speed gearbox was supplied at first but a new four-speed Twin-Top (Note: Top gear was always direct drive to avoid noise from the gearbox. Development of still expensive but "silent" gear sets provided a third gear as near quiet as top gear) version was an option from 1932 and became standard in 1933. A new synchromesh gearbox was announced in August 1933 along with the availability of the large 1711cc engine to go with new chassis and bodywork.

== Brakes, suspension, & steering ==
The chassis was very conventional with semi-elliptic leaf springs on all wheels and rigid axles front and rear. The transmission brake has been discontinued in favour of brakes on the road wheels. Steering is by worm and wheel. At the top of the steering wheel there is an electric horn button and the headlamp control lever for the dip and switch mechanism. The electrical system for both lighting and starting is 12-volt.

The chassis was shared from September 1932 with the four-cylinder Light Twelve-Four as well as the original Austin Twelve.

In August 1933 a newly designed chassis was introduced for the Twelve-Six and Twelve-Four cars. It had a dropped and cross-braced frame under the new bodies. At the same time a new design for front and rear axles entered production fitted with new brakes and a new revised linkage to the driver's brake pedal. The back axle was modified and now has combined load and thrust journals to reduce weight. Steering gear, previously worm and wheel, was changed in August 1935 to an hour-glass worm and sector.

== Extras ==
Items supplied as standard include an air cleaner and an electric windscreen wiper in front of the driver and a big reflecting mirror together with a clock and a petrol gauge, motometer and retractable luggage carrier. From September 1932 bumpers and Magna wheels were provided on deluxe models without extra charge.

== Coachwork ==
There were just two four-door six-light (three windows on each side) saloon bodies offered: a Harley pressed metal car and a Clifton fabric bodied saloon. For 1932 the fabric saloon (now well out of fashion) was dropped but a de luxe Harley saloon with bumpers and a sunshine roof and open two (Eton) and four-seater (Open Road) tourers were added in September 1931.

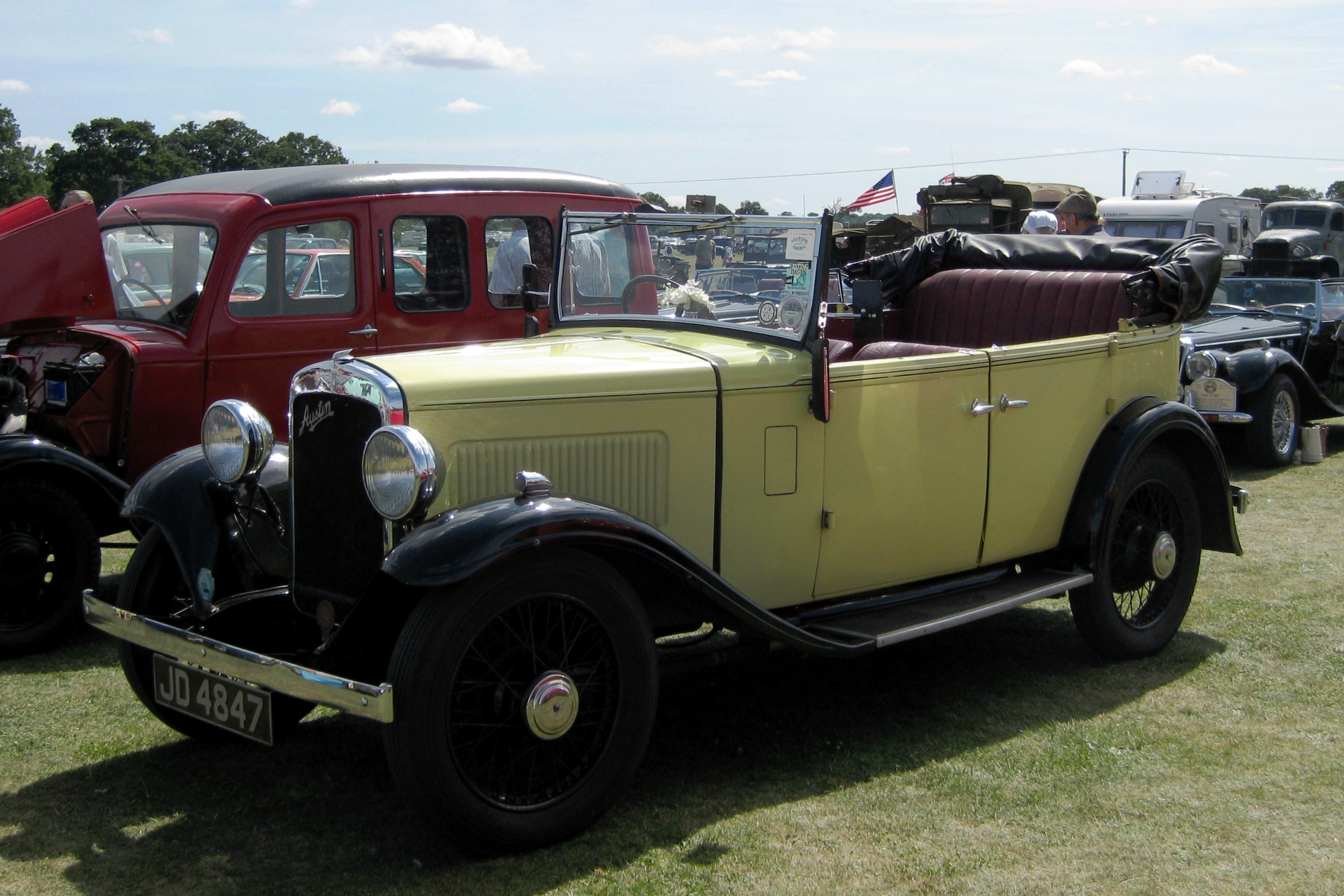
Light Twelve-Six Open Road tourer registered November 1934

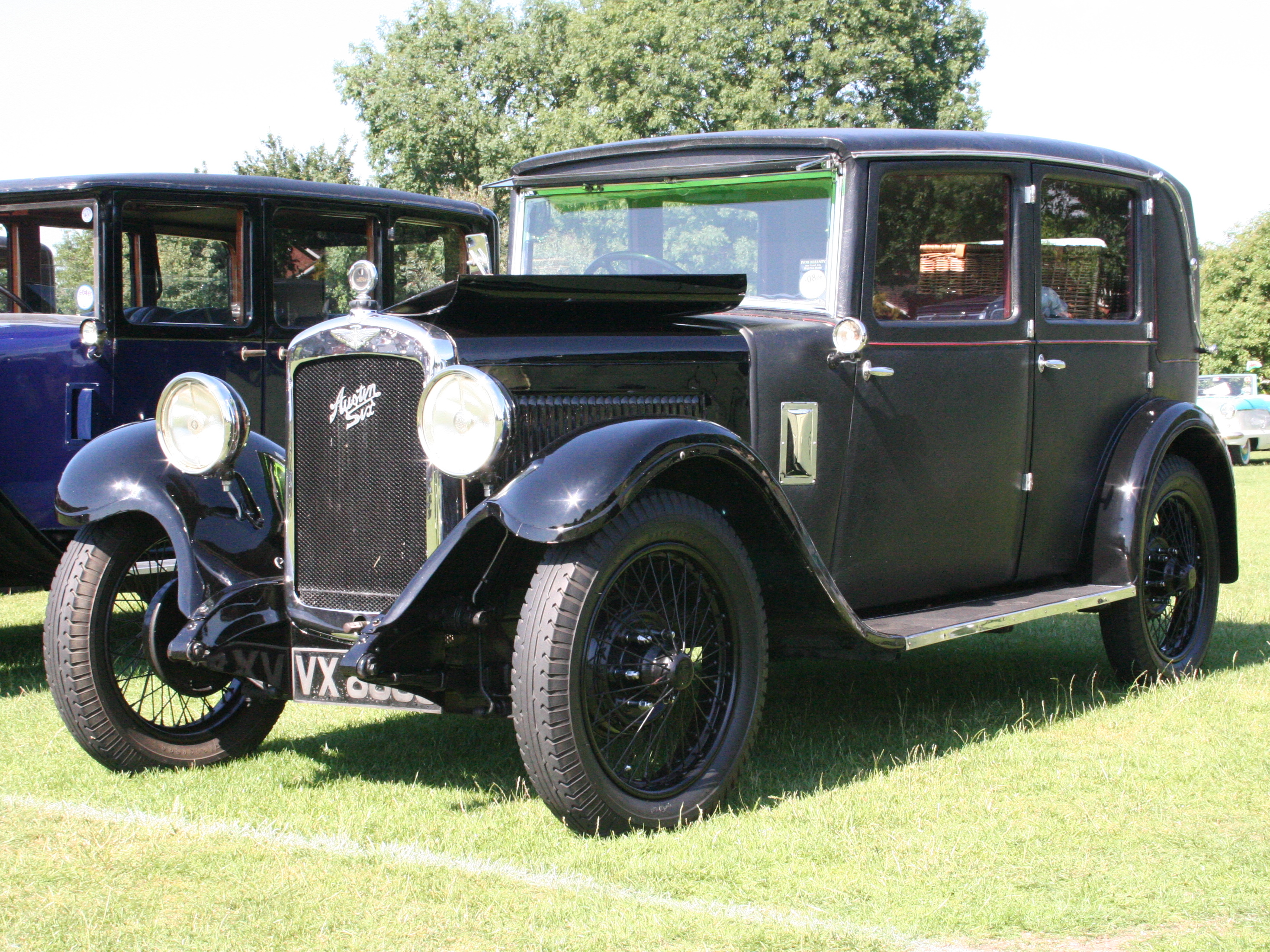
Light Twelve-Six Clifton 4-light fabric sports saloon c. 1931-1932

== Road test ==
The review of the metal Harley was favourable. Of special note was the unusually good entrance by all doorways. The design of the rods and cables to the new brakes on the wheels was criticised though in use the brakes were excellent. Both the cooling and the clutch worked well. The lower gears were reasonably quiet. The steering is too sensitive though the action is light and the suspension would not disgrace a car of four times the price. With the driver and one passenger the top speed was 48 mph.

A subsequent review 15 months later suggested that engine vibration might be damped by rubber insulation. The new Twin-Top gearbox has indirect gears that are a great improvement over Austin's previous offering. A change to a cam steering mechanism was recommended to improve the steering's steadiness. 60 miles an hour was the highest comfortable speed.

== Range development ==
Bumpers and Magna wheels were standardised on all Austin's de luxe models in September 1932 and in addition there were all round price reductions. In August 1933 a new Ascot saloon was announced with chassis improvements and the same changes as made to the Twelve-Four range. The new Ascot had a new separate compartment for the spare tyre and its hinged panel forms a luggage platform when lowered.

The chromium-plated radiator shell was succeeded in August 1934 by a radiator cowl painted in body colour and the body given more modern wings with valances for better protection. The Harley was dropped for 1935.

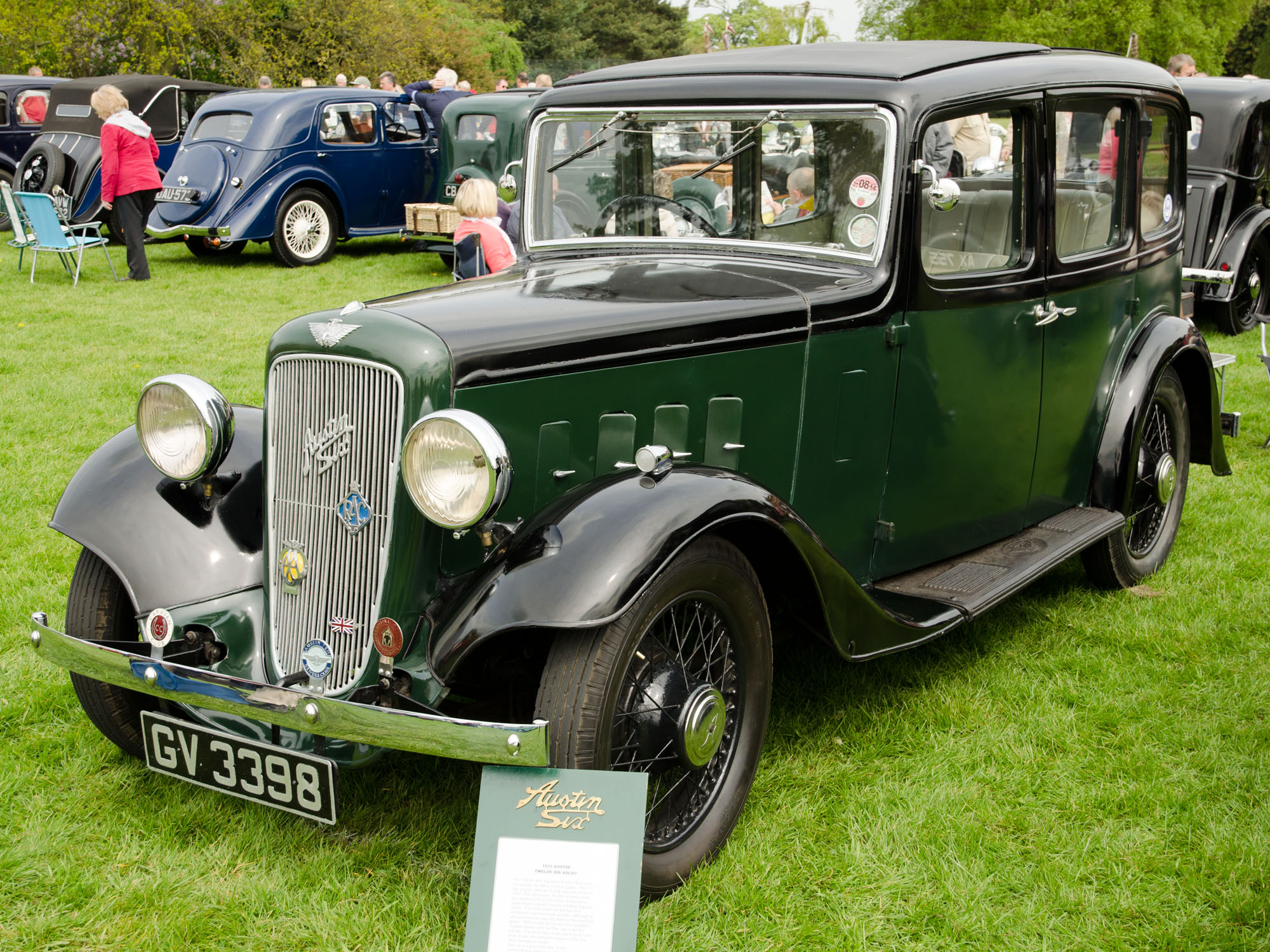
Light Twelve Six Ascot saloon registered April 1935 with Magna wire wheels

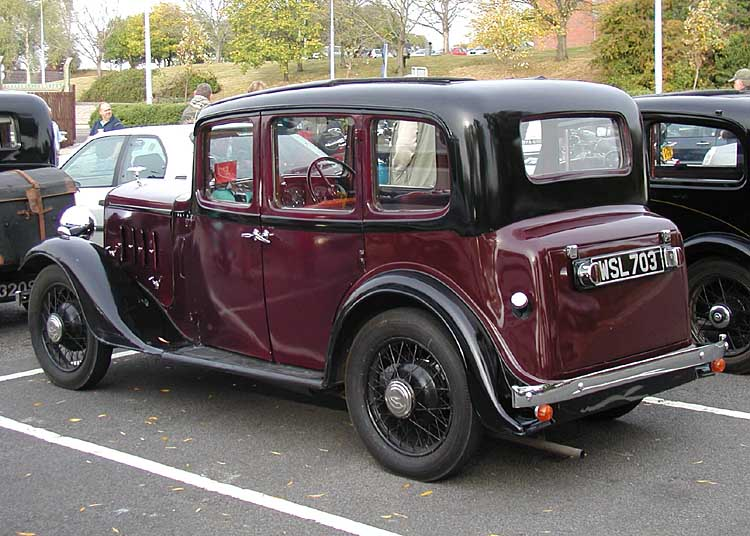
Light Twelve-Six Ascot saloon and spare wheel compartment 1935 Magna wheels

Sports variants were added in August 1933 with a lowered chassis and higher compression engine. A 4-seater sports tourer and a saloon named Greyhound. In 1936 another body named Kempton was available on the same chassis. These cars carry a distinctive radiator shell. The sports models shared the new illuminated semaphore direction indicators and synchromesh gears.

Current catalogue after August 1933 (cars supplied with either 13.9 hp or 15.9 hp engines for the same price):

- saloons: standard £205, Harley £225 or Ascot £235, the last two with sliding heads (sunroofs)
- open tourers Eton 2-seater £200 and Open Road 4-seater £200
- sports tourer £275 and Greyhound sports saloon £305

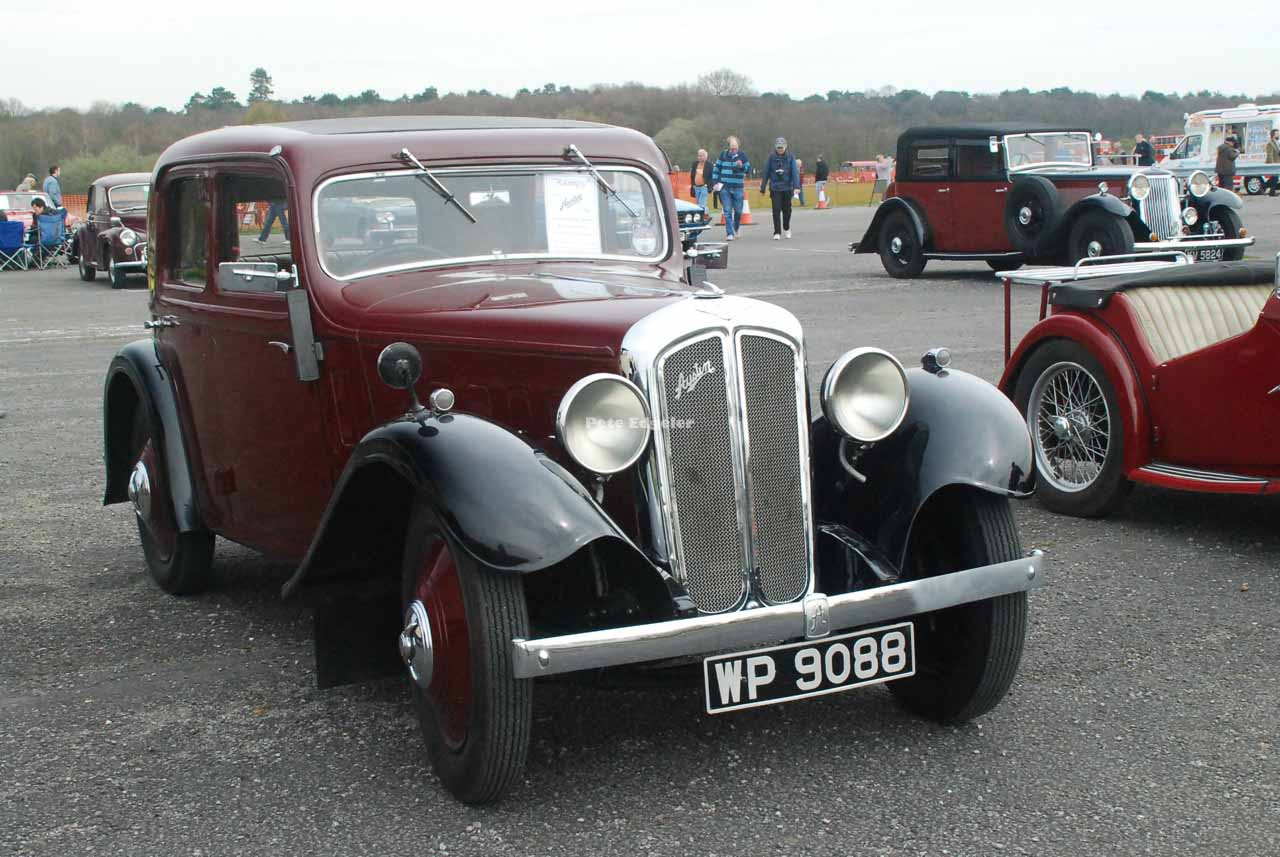
Light Twelve-Six 1935 Kempton sports saloon, 1711cc also available with 1496 cc engine, both engines with a high compression cylinder head and high lift camshaft producing 41 bhp @ 3,800 or 37 bhp @ 3,800

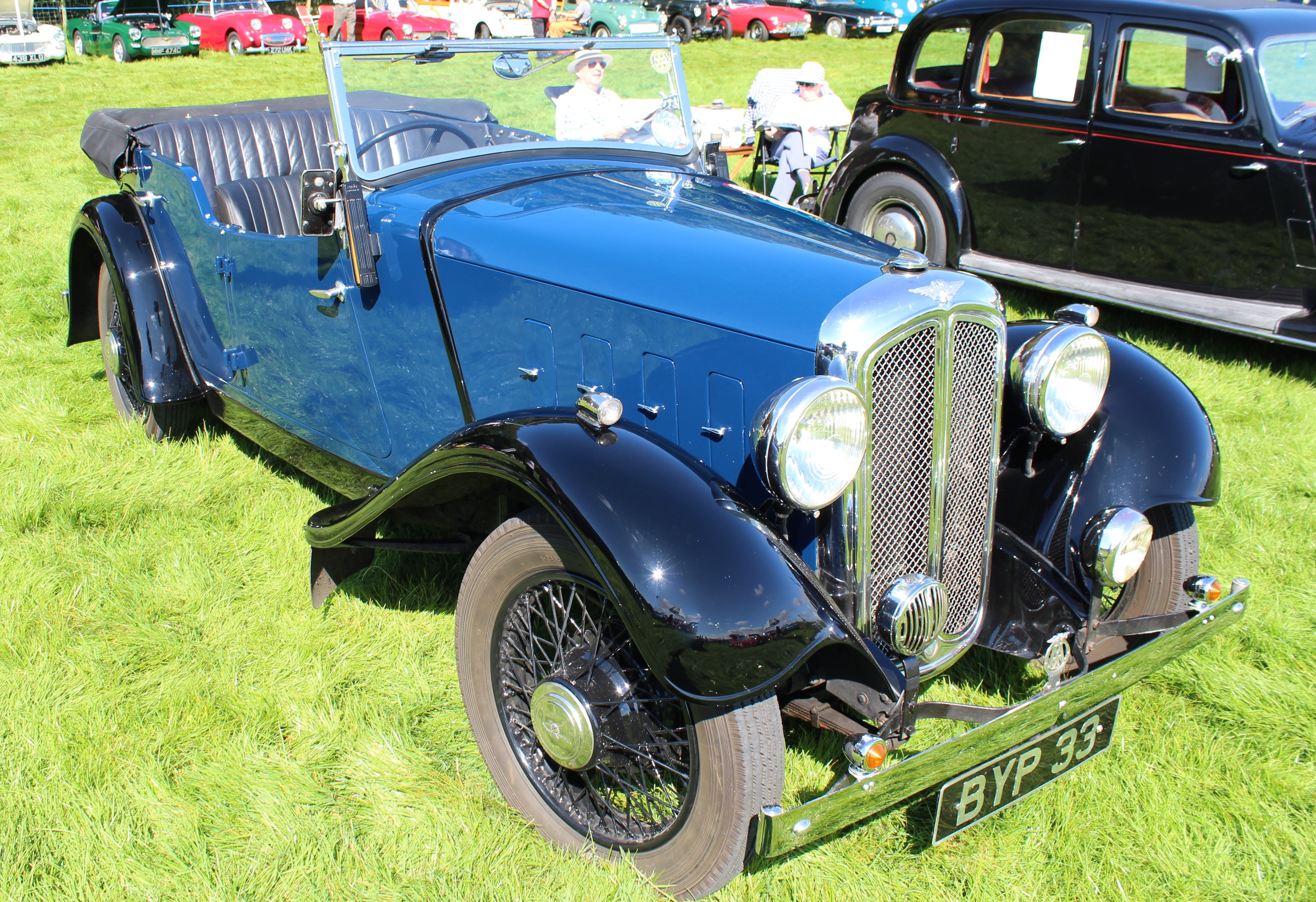
Light Twelve-Six 1935 Newbury 4-seater tourer

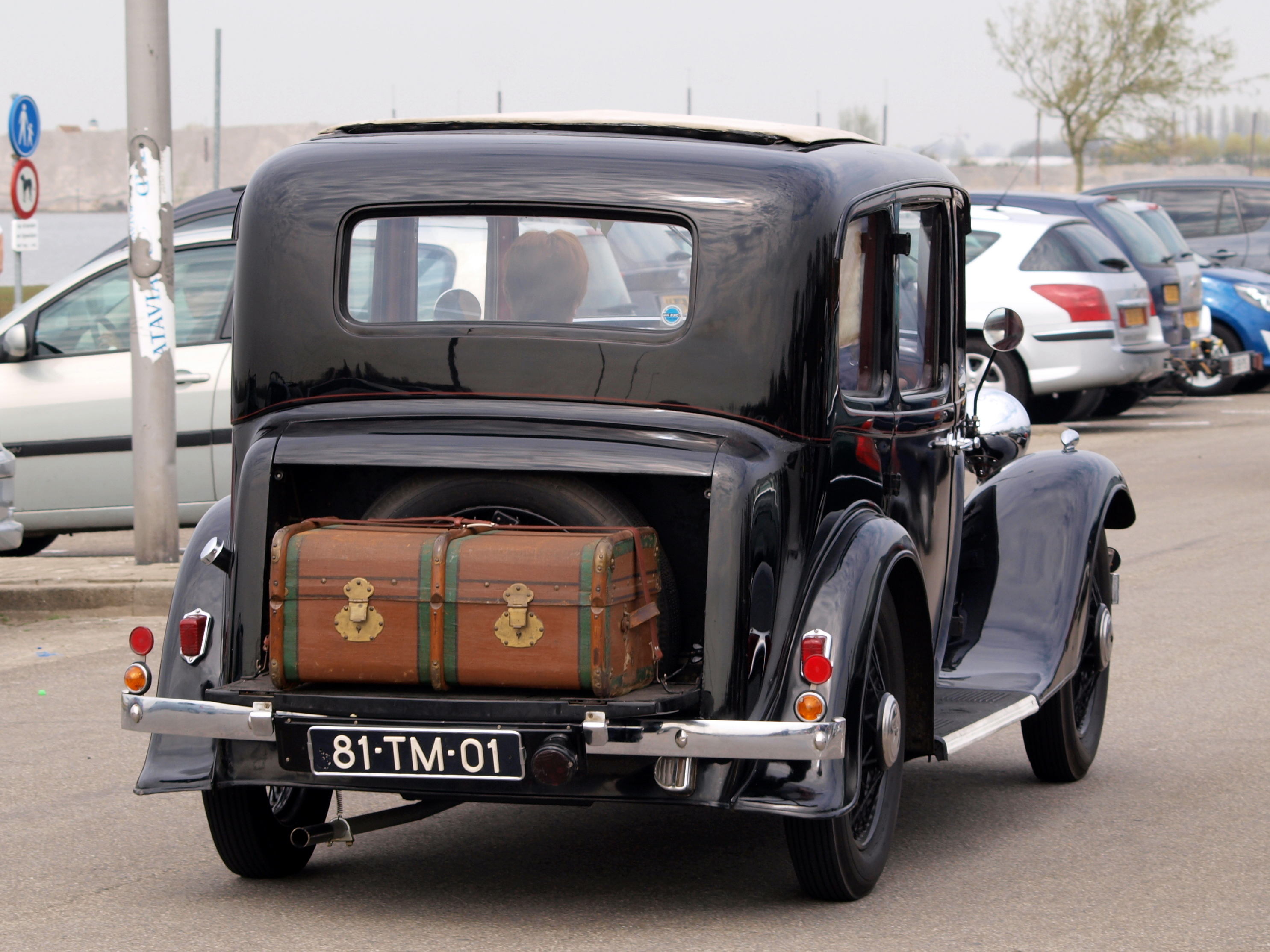
Ascot spare wheel compartment (12/4)

1936	Ascot saloon	Kempton sports saloon	Open Road tourer	Eton two-seater
length	158 in (4013 mm)	156 in (3962 mm)	158 in (4013 mm)	158 in (4013 mm)
width	61.5 in (1562 mm)	62.0 in (1575 mm)	61.5 in (1562 mm)	61.5 in (1562 mm)
height	66.0 in (1676 mm)	62.0 in (1575 mm)	67.5 in (1715 mm)	67.5 in (1715 mm)

Austin's Goodwood 14 took the place of the Twelve-Six saloons. The tourers remained available but briefly and were not replaced.
