= Austin 12/4 =

Light Twelve-Four Twelve-Four Twelve
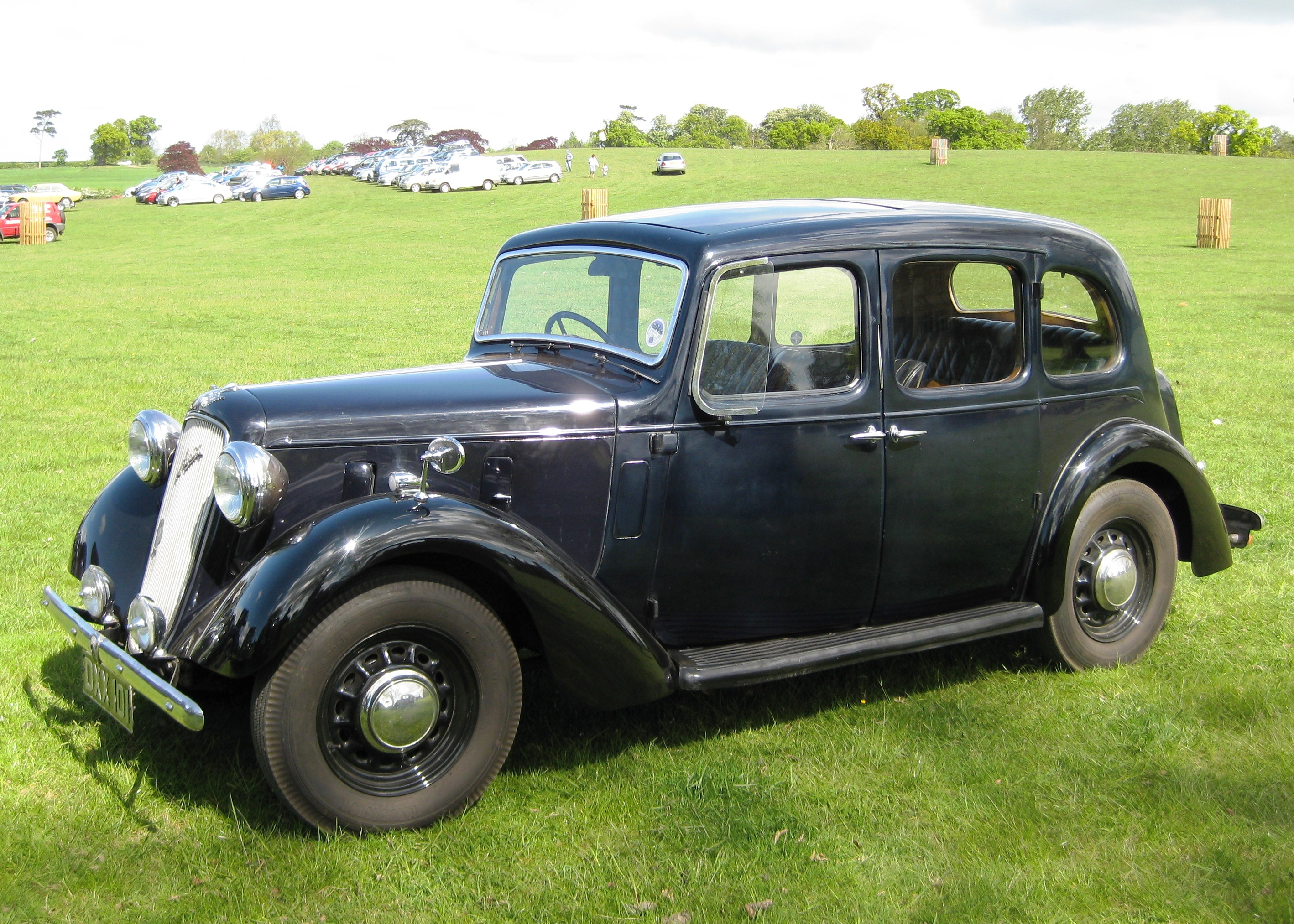
- Austin Twelve New Ascot shape announced 11 August 1936

Overview
- Manufacturer: Austin
- Production: 1933–1939; 71,654 produced

Body and chassis
- Body style: saloon, tourer, estate car, van

Powertrain
- Engine: 1535 cc Straight-4
- Transmission: in one unit with the engine: single-plate clutch, 4-speed centrally controlled gearbox with synchromesh on 2, 3 & top.Three quarter floating rear axle

Dimensions
- Wheelbase: 106 in (2,700 mm) track 4' 2", 50 in (1,300 mm)
- Length: 154 in (3,900 mm)
- Width: 60 in (1,500 mm)

Chronology
- Predecessor: Austin 12 hp ("Heavy" 12)
- Successor: Austin 12 (1939 model)

Light Twelve-Four 1535 cc Eleven.Nine

Overview
- Manufacturer: Austin

Layout
- Configuration: Straight 4-cylinder
- Displacement: 1,535 cc (94 cu in)
- Cylinder bore: 69.3 mm (2.73 in)
- Piston stroke: 101.6 mm (4.00 in)
- Cylinder block material: cast iron
- Cylinder head material: detachable, pistons are aluminium
- Valvetrain: side-by-side valves

Combustion
- Fuel system: downdraught carburettor supplied by pump from tank at rear of the car. Contents gauge on instrument panel
- Fuel type: petrol
- Oil system: forced lubrication by gear wheel pump to all crankshaft bearings, camshaft and big end bearings

Output
- Power output: 24 bhp (18 kW; 24 PS) @2,400 rpm 28 bhp (21 kW; 28 PS) @3,000 rpm Tax horsepower 11.9

Chronology
- Successor: Austin Twelve 1535 cc

The Austin Light Twelve-Four is a car that was produced by Austin from 1933 until 1939. It was replaced in 1939 by a completely new car also called the Austin 12 which kept the same engine. The "12" in the name referred to the taxation horsepower, a British rating which controlled the annual taxation payable to use the car on the road.

== Austin Twelve-Four Ascot ==
Austin introduced this new car in September 1932. It was made by fitting a 1535 cc side-valve, four-cylinder engine with 24 bhp output into the same chassis as they had been making since late 1930 for their six-cylinder 12/6 which was also in the same 12 hp class. This new four cylinder engine was coupled to a four-speed "crash" gearbox at first, but a new transmission with synchromesh on third and top speed appeared in 1934 and then also on second in 1935.

Austin Light Twelve-Four or Twelve-Four

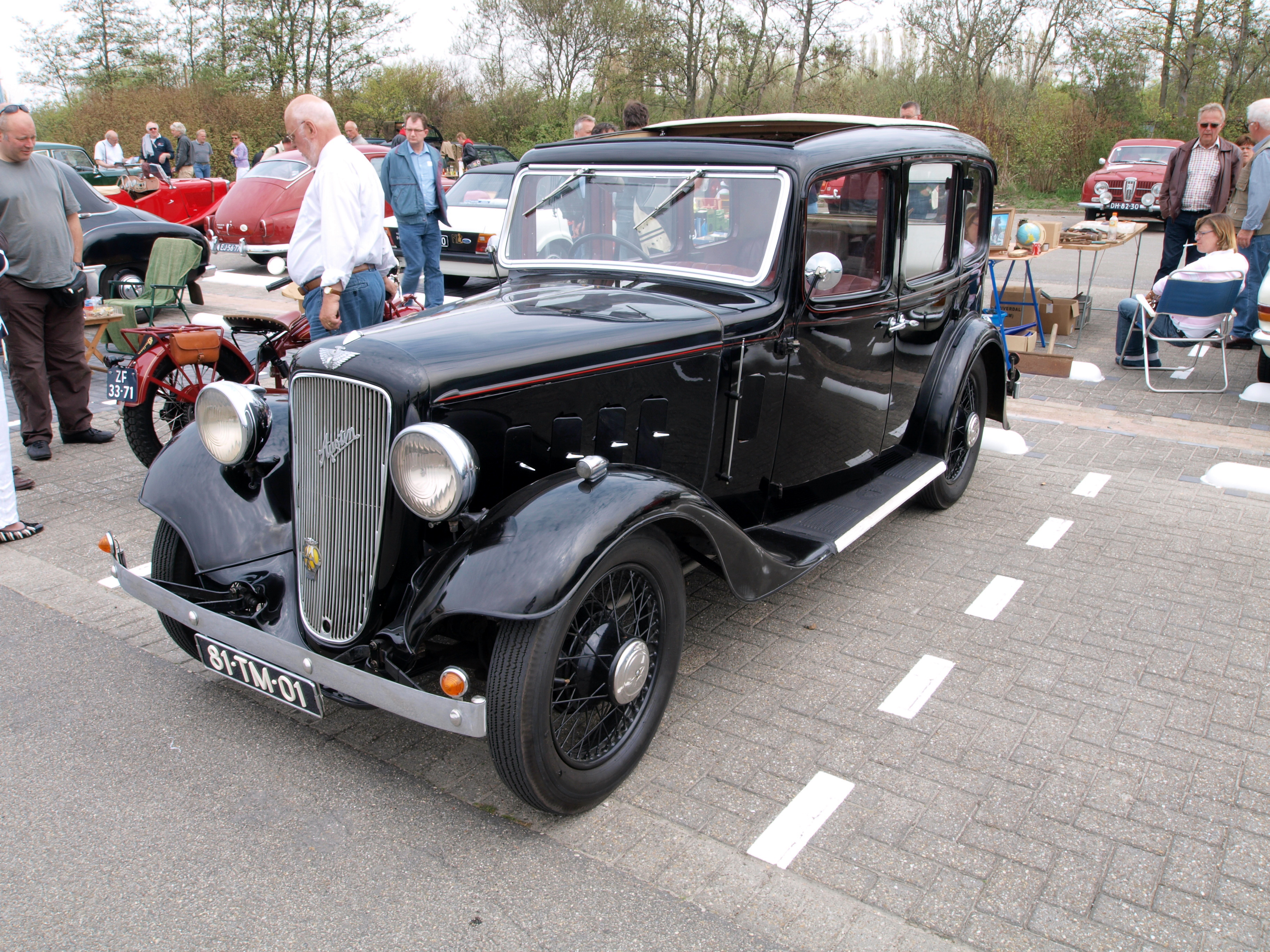
Ascot 6-light saloon

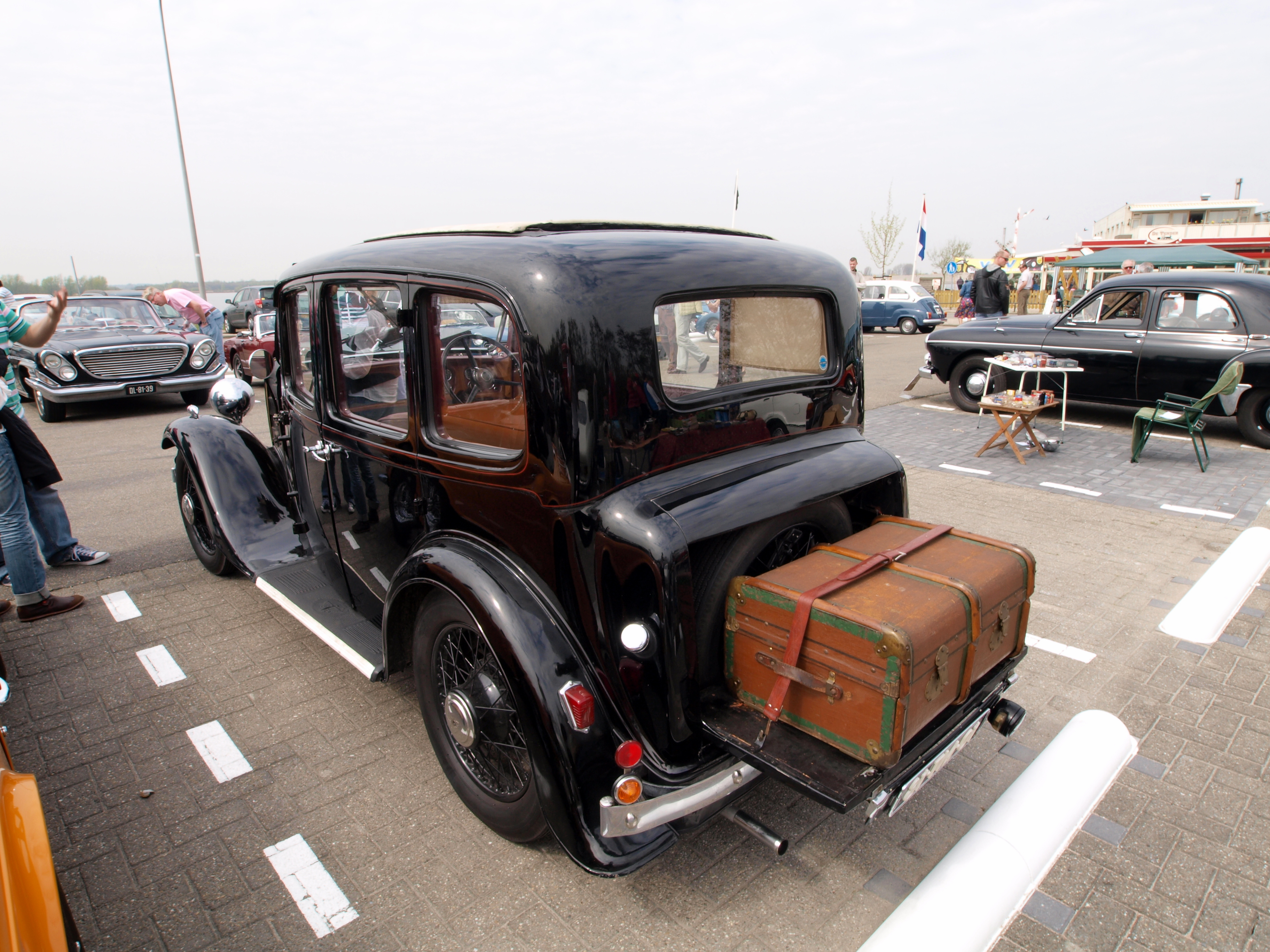

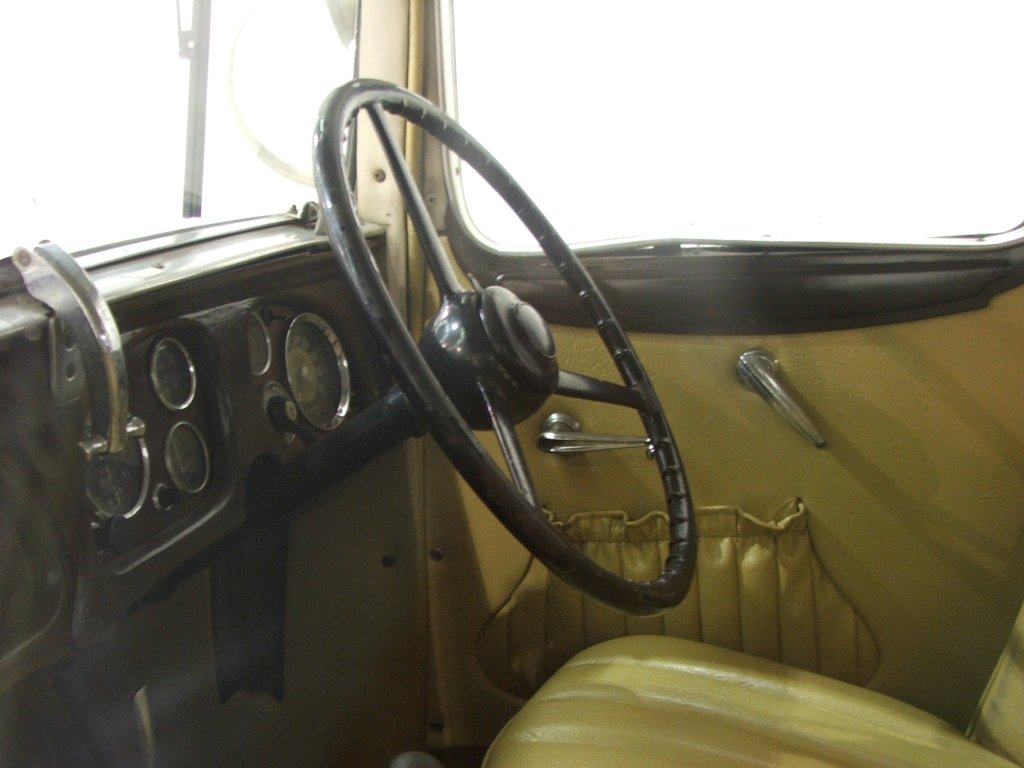

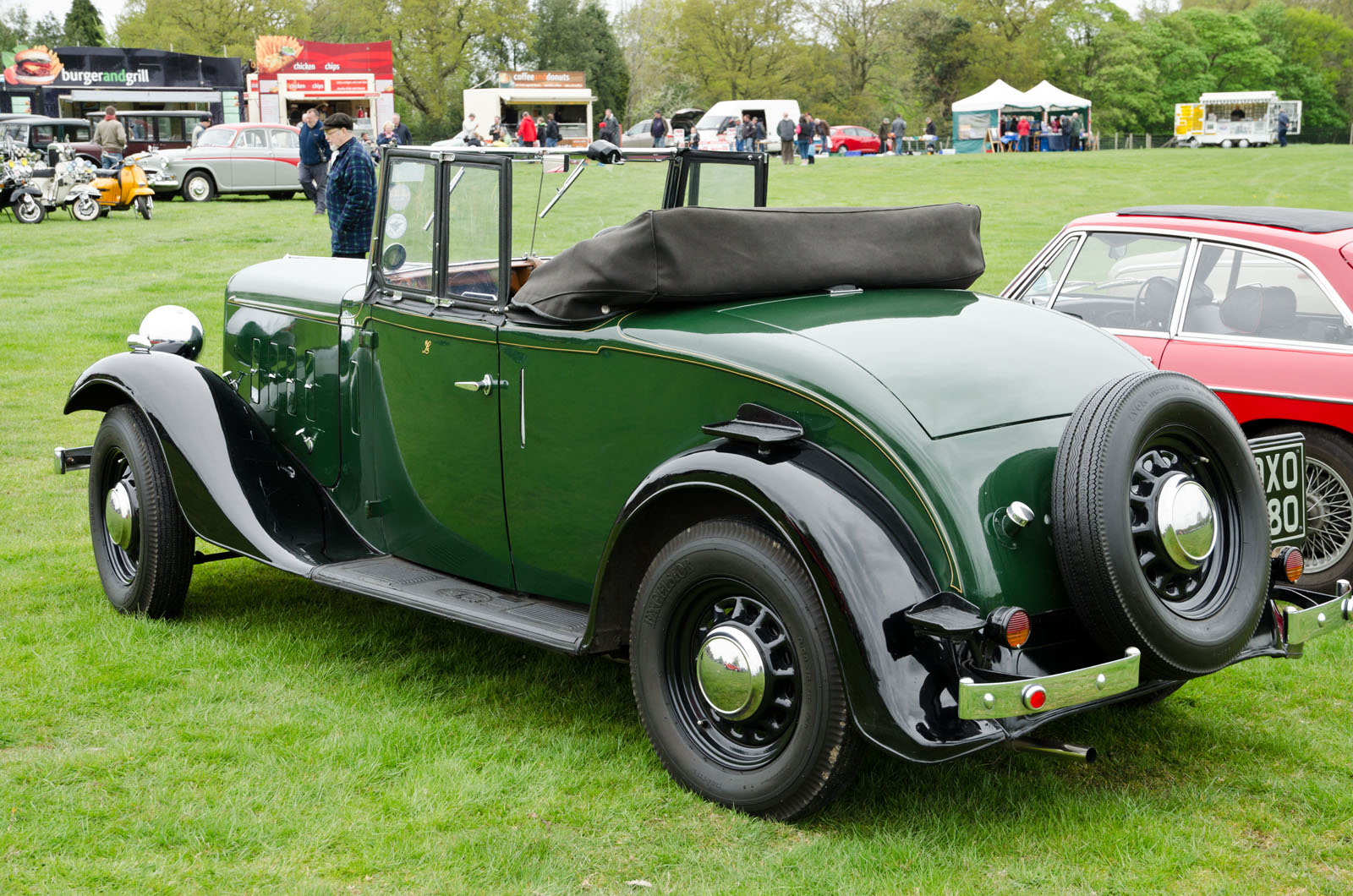
Eton two-seater tourer

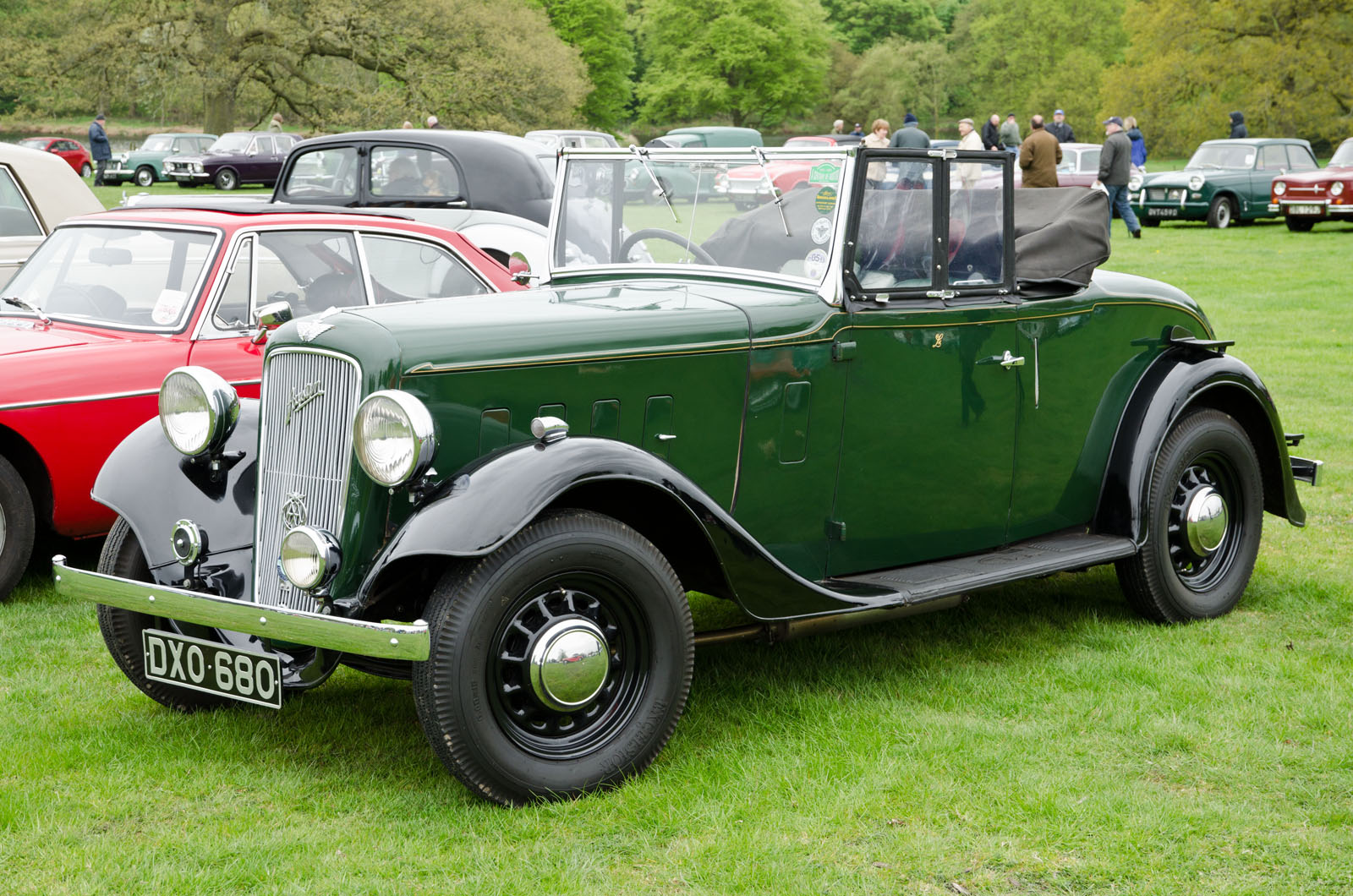

The chassis was very conventional, with semi-elliptic leaf springs on all wheels and rigid axles front and rear. Wire wheels were fitted until 1937 when they were replaced with pressed steel ones. At launch there was a choice of a pressed steel six-light (three windows on each side) saloon called the Harley and a two-seat tourer. A second saloon style with a boot, the Ascot, was added in 1934 and the Harley was dropped in 1935. In the same year the chromium-plated radiator shell was replaced by one painted in body colour. The very early cars had their side lights mounted on the scuttle, but these soon moved to the tops of the wings.

1936	Ascot saloon	Open Road tourer	Eton two-seater tourer
length	158 in (4,000 mm)	158 in (4,000 mm)	158 in (4,000 mm)
width	61.5 in (1,560 mm)	61.5 in (1,560 mm)	61.5 in (1,560 mm)
height	66 in (1,700 mm)	67.5 in (1,710 mm)	67.5 in (1,710 mm)

== Austin Twelve New Ascot ==
On 11 August 1936 Austin announced a major update for 1937 with the engine being moved forward on the chassis to improve passenger space. Other improvements included an adjustable steering column and the windscreen wipers moving to the scuttle from the top of the screen. The bodies became much more rounded and in 1938 an estate car was added to the model line-up and the tourer, which was still being built in the old style, was replaced by a four-door cabriolet.

=== for 1939 ===
Higher and wider doors were introduced for both Twelve and Fourteen in midsummer 1938.

Austin Twelve New Ascot 1936 and higher and wider doors introduced July 1938

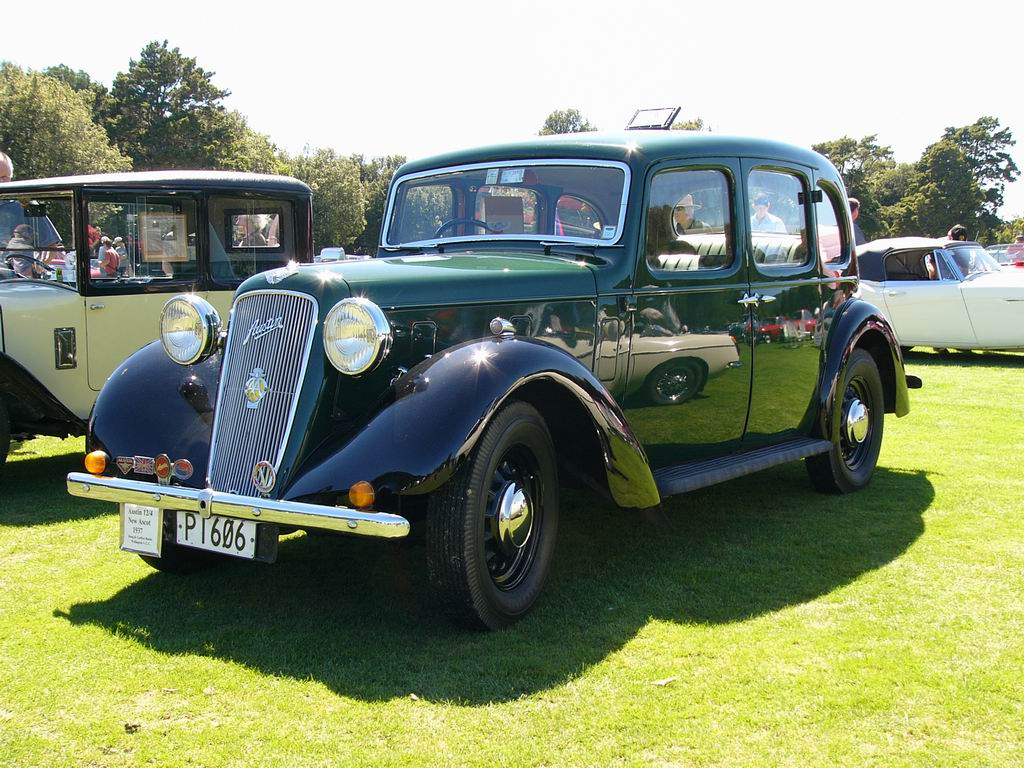
New body for 1937

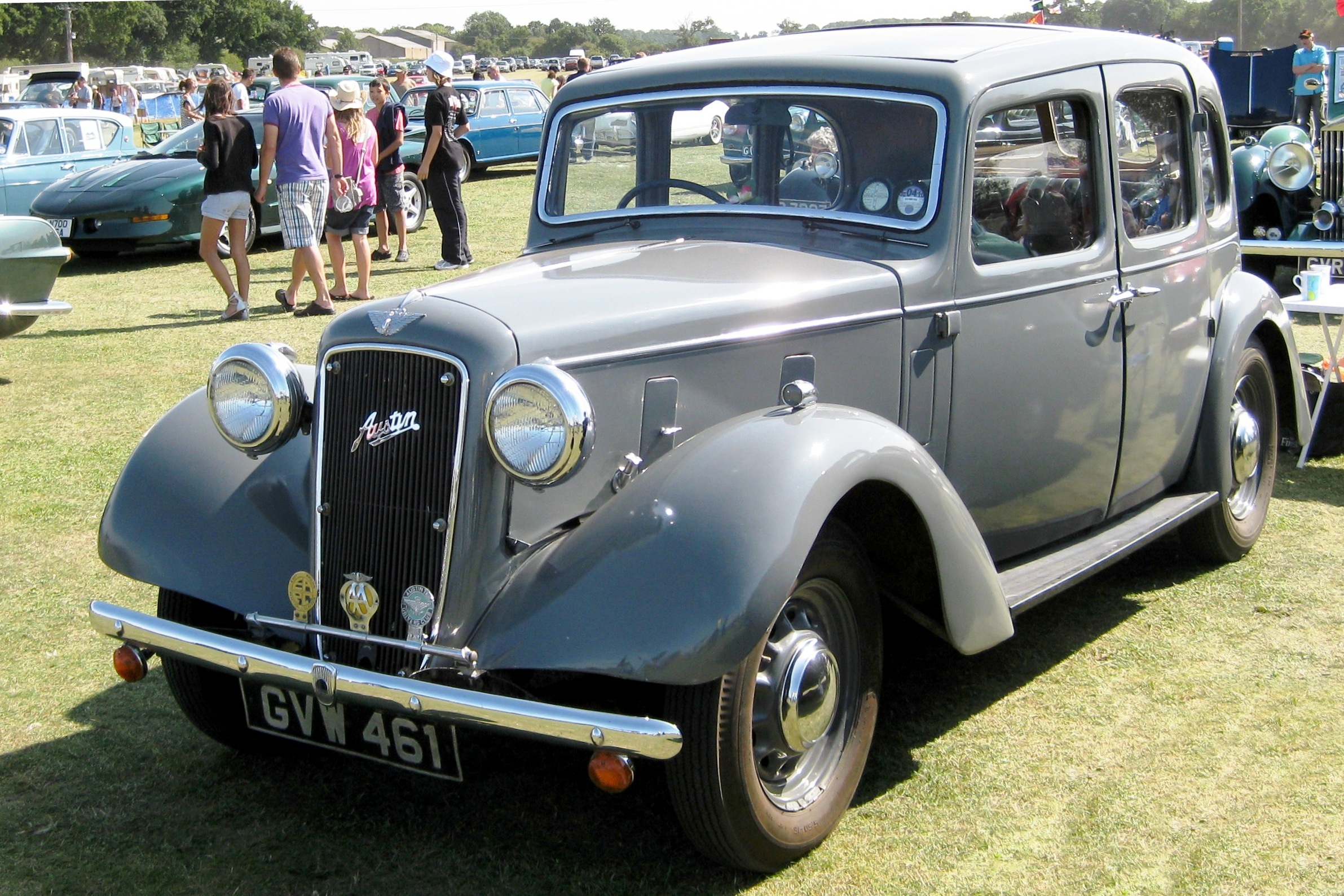
Enlarged doors announced mid 1938

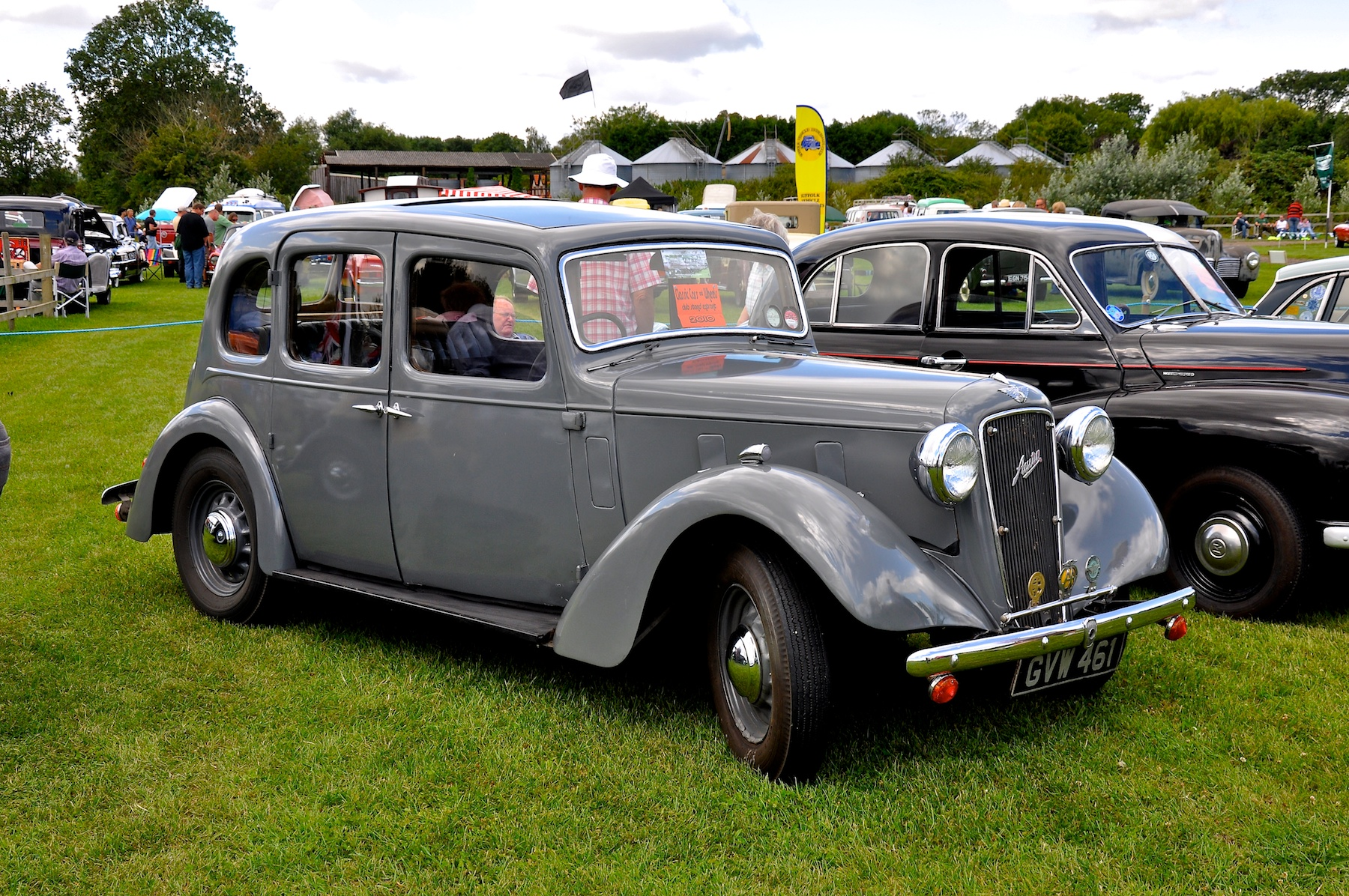
1938-39
